= Marshmello discography =

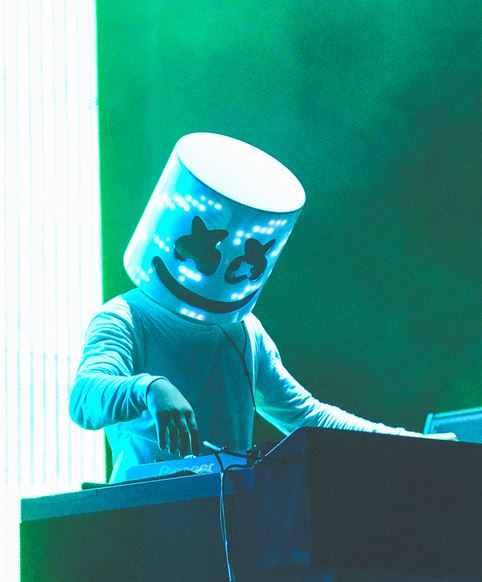
- Marshmello performing at the Mad Decent Block Party in 2016
- Studio albums: 6
- EPs: 4
- Singles: 48
- Other charted songs: 9
- Remixes: 16
- Music videos: 44
- Production credits: 5

The American music producer and DJ Marshmello has released six studio albums, four extended plays, forty-seven singles, nine other charted songs, sixteen remixes, forty-three music videos and seven production-credited songs. Marshmello's debut studio album Joytime was released through his Joytime Collective record label on January 8, 2016. Despite failing to debut on the Billboard 200, the album peaked on three Billboard charts: Dance/Electronic Albums, Top Heatseekers and Independent Albums, at number five, fourteen and forty-one, respectively.

"Keep It Mello", the only single from Joytime, charted on the Dance/Electronic Songs chart at number twenty-five. It was also certified gold by the Recording Industry Association of America (RIAA). His next single "Colour" failed to imitate the success of its predecessor as it did not appear on any chart. Marshmello's third single "Alone", however, became his first song to debut on the Billboard Hot 100, peaking at number twenty-eight, and chart in Canada. It was released via the Canadian independent record label Monstercat. The song was also certified platinum in Canada (Music Canada) and the United States (RIAA). Marshmello's following seven singles, which feature collaborations with artists such as Far East Movement, Ookay and Slushii, failed to appear on the Billboard Hot 100.

One of his most successful singles, "Silence", featuring R&B singer Khalid, was released by RCA Records on August 11, 2017. It charted in the top ten of more than fifteen countries such as Germany, Sweden and Norway, and was certified multi-platinum in countries such as Australia, Canada and Sweden. Following that, Marshmello released another successful single, a collaboration with pop singer Selena Gomez titled "Wolves", which topped the charts in Latvia, Poland and Hungary, and the Billboard Dance/Electronic Songs chart. It was also his highest-charting Billboard Hot 100 song in 2017. His first single of 2018 was a posthumous collaboration with American rapper Lil Peep, titled "Spotlight". The following single "Friends", released with British singer Anne-Marie, became his highest-charting song on the Billboard Hot 100 at that time, peaking at number eleven. Marshmello's collaboration with rapper Logic titled "Everyday" peaked at number twenty-nine on the Hot 100 while four of his subsequent singles failed to appear on the chart.

Marshmello released his second studio album Joytime II on June 22, 2018, via his Joytime Collective label, featuring two singles. The album became his first to debut on the Billboard 200. His next single was a song with the British band Bastille, titled "Happier", which became his highest-charting song in Canada, Sweden, the United Kingdom and the United States. It received a double-platinum certification in Australia and Canada. Nearly one year after Joytime II, he released Joytime III on July 2, 2019. The album became his first to receive a position on charts in Belgium, Canada, the Netherlands, Norway, and Sweden. Two years later, he released Shockwave on June 11, 2021, which features four singles.

On September 8, 2023, Marshmello released the single "Other Boys", which features a collaboration with artist Dove Cameron via his label Joytime Collective under license to Disruptor Records and Columbia Records.

== Albums ==
=== Studio albums ===
List of studio albums, with selected chart positions and album details
Title	Album details	Peak chart positions									
Title	Album details	US	US Dance	US Heat.	US Ind.	BEL (FL)	BEL (WA)	CAN	NLD	NOR	SWE
Joytime	Released: January 8, 2016; Label: Joytime Collective; Formats: Digital download, streaming	—	5	14	41	—	—	—	—	—	—
Joytime II	Released: June 22, 2018; Label: Joytime Collective; Formats: Digital download, streaming	165	1	6	21	—	—	—	—	—	—
Joytime III	Released: July 2, 2019; Label: Joytime Collective; Formats: Digital download, streaming	50	1	—	29	103	131	53	73	19	50
Shockwave	Released: June 11, 2021; Label: Joytime Collective; Formats: Digital download, streaming	—	3	—	44	—	—	—	—	—	—
Sugar Papi	Released: November 3, 2023; Label: Joytime Collective; Formats: Digital download, streaming	97	1	—	—	—	—	—	—	—	—
The Roots	Released: November 13, 2024; Label: Joytime Collective; Formats: Digital download, streaming	—	—	—	—	—	—	—	—	—	—
"—" denotes items which were not released in that country or failed to chart.

=== Mix albums ===
List of mix albums, with selected chart positions and album details
Title	Album details	Peak chart positions		
Title	Album details	US	US Dance	CAN
Marshmello Fortnite Extended Set	Released: February 2, 2019; Label: Joytime Collective; Formats: Digital download, streaming	45	1	31

== Extended plays ==
List of extended plays with details
Title	EP details
Right	Released: 2015; Label: Spinnup; Formats: Digital download
Roll the Dice (with SOB X RBE)	Released: April 11, 2019; Label: Joytime Collective; Formats: Digital download
Mellokillaz (with Tropkillaz)	Released: June 16, 2023; Label: Joytime Collective; Formats: Digital download
Mellodeath Tapes Vol. I (with Svdden Death)	Released: March 8, 2024; Label: Joytime Collective; Formats: Digital download
It's Riddim Time	Released: April 26, 2024 (release on SoundCloud) / May 24, 2024 (release on Spotify, Apple Music, Beatport, etc.); Label: Joytime Collective; Formats: Digital download

== Singles ==
=== As lead artist ===
List of singles as lead artist, with selected chart positions and certifications, showing year released and album name
Title	Year	Peak chart positions										Certifications	Album
Title	Year	US	US Dance	AUS	BEL (FL)	CAN	GER	NOR	NZ	SWE	UK	Certifications	Album
"Keep It Mello" (Note: Adapted from Marshmello on iTunes.) (featuring Omar LinX)	2016	—	25	—	—	—	—	—	—	—	—	RIAA: Gold; MC: Gold	Joytime
"Colour"	2016	—	—	—	—	—	—	—	—	—	—		Non-album single
"Alone"	2016	28	3	— (Note: "Alone" did not enter the ARIA Singles Chart, but peaked at number 30 on the ARIA Digital Track Chart.)	—	11	—	—	—	— (Note: "Alone" did not enter the Swedish Singellista Chart, but peaked at number 16 on the Swedish Heatseeker Chart.)	61	RIAA: 5× Platinum; BPI: Gold; MC: Platinum; RMNZ: Platinum	Monstercat 027 – Cataclysm
"Magic" (with Jauz)	2016	—	—	—	—	—	—	—	—	—	—		Non-album single
"Freal Luv" (with Far East Movement featuring Chanyeol and Tinashe)	2016	—	20	—	—	—	—	—	—	—	—		Identity
"Ritual" (featuring Wrabel)	2016	—	11	—	—	82	—	—	—	—	—		Non-album singles
"Chasing Colors" (with Ookay featuring Noah Cyrus)	2017	—	8	—	—	49	—	—	—	—	—		Non-album singles
"Twinbow" (with Slushii)	2017	—	—	—	—	—	—	—	—	—	—		Non-album singles
"Moving On"	2017	—	13	—	—	—	—	—	—	—	—		Non-album singles
"Love U"	2017	—	14	—	—	—	—	—	—	—	—		Non-album singles
"Silence" (featuring Khalid)	2017	30	1	5	5	7	6	2	3	5	3	RIAA: 6× Platinum; ARIA: 7× Platinum; BEA: 2× Platinum; BPI: 3× Platinum; BVMI: 2× Platinum; GLF: 5× Platinum; MC: 9× Platinum; RMNZ: 7× Platinum	Non-album singles
"You & Me"	2017	—	19	—	—	—	—	—	—	—	—		Non-album singles
"Wolves" (with Selena Gomez)	2017	20	1	5	7	7	11	5	10	7	9	RIAA: 4× Platinum; ARIA: 7× Platinum; BEA: Platinum; BPI: Platinum; BVMI: Platinum; GLF: 2× Platinum; IFPI NOR: 3× Platinum; MC: 6× Platinum; RMNZ: 3× Platinum	Rare (Target deluxe edition)
"Spotlight" (with Lil Peep)	2018	— (Note: "Spotlight" did not enter the Billboard Hot 100, but peaked at number three on the Bubbling Under Hot 100 chart, which acts as a quasi-extension to the Hot 100.)	—	—	—	73	—	—	— (Note: "Spotlight" did not enter the NZ Top 40 Singles Chart, but peaked at number three on the NZ Heatseeker Singles Chart.)	61	74	RIAA: Platinum; BPI: Silver; RMNZ: Gold	Non-album single
"Friends" (with Anne-Marie)	2018	11	—	4	3	5	1	4	6	5	4	RIAA: 4× Platinum; ARIA: 4× Platinum; BEA: Platinum; BPI: 3× Platinum; BVMI: Platinum; IFPI NOR: 2× Platinum; MC: 7× Platinum; RMNZ: 4× Platinum	Speak Your Mind
"Everyday" (with Logic)	2018	29	—	38	—	15	48	20	36	34	46	RIAA: Gold; BPI: Silver; BVMI: Gold; MC: Platinum; RMNZ: Platinum	Bobby Tarantino II
"Fly" (Note: Adapted from Marshmello's channel on YouTube.) (featuring Leah Culver)	2018	—	7	—	—	—	—	—	—	—	—		Non-album singles
"You Can Cry" (with Juicy J featuring James Arthur)	2018	—	—	—	—	—	—	—	— (Note: "You Can Cry" did not enter the NZ Top 40 Singles Chart, but peaked at number nine on the NZ Heatseeker Singles Chart.)	— (Note: "You Can Cry" did not enter the Swedish Singellista Chart, but peaked at number 12 on the Swedish Heatseeker Chart.)	91		Non-album singles
"Tell Me"	2018	—	15	—	—	—	—	—	—	—	—		Joytime II
"Check This Out"	2018	— (Note: "Check This Out" did not enter the Billboard Hot 100, but peaked at number 25 on the Bubbling Under Hot 100 chart, which acts as a quasi-extension to the Hot 100.)	10	—	—	86	—	—	—	—	—		Joytime II
"Happier" (with Bastille)	2018	2	1	3	7	2	9	7	3	4	2	RIAA: Diamond; ARIA: 6× Platinum; BEA: Gold; BPI: 3× Platinum; BVMI: 3× Gold; GLF: 3× Platinum; MC: 6× Platinum; RMNZ: 6× Platinum	Non-album singles
"Bayen Habeit (In Love)" (with Amr Diab)	2018	—	—	—	—	—	—	—	—	—	—		Non-album singles
"Project Dreams" (with Roddy Ricch)	2018	— (Note: "Project Dreams" did not enter the Billboard Hot 100, but peaked at number eight on the Bubbling Under Hot 100 chart, which acts as a quasi-extension to the Hot 100.)	—	—	83	—	—	—	— (Note: "Project Dreams" did not enter the NZ Top 40 Singles Chart, but peaked at number 20 on the NZ Hot Singles Chart.)	—	—	RIAA: Platinum; BPI: Silver; MC: Platinum; RMNZ: Gold	Non-album singles
"Biba" (with Pritam featuring Shirley Setia)	2019	—	31	—	—	—	—	—	—	—	—		Non-album singles
"Sell Out" (with Svdden Death)	2019	—	36	—	—	—	—	—	—	—	—		Non-album singles
"Here with Me" (featuring Chvrches)	2019	31	3	9	20	15	49	28	24	39	9	RIAA: 2× Platinum; ARIA: Platinum; BEA: Gold; BPI: Platinum; BVMI: Gold; MC: 2× Platinum; RMNZ: 2× Platinum	Non-album singles
"Light It Up" (featuring Tyga and Chris Brown)	2019	90	—	60	—	75	77	—	— (Note: "Light It Up" did not enter the NZ Top 40 Singles Chart, but peaked at number four on the NZ Hot Singles Chart.)	— (Note: "Light It Up" did not enter the Swedish Singellista Chart, but peaked at number two on the Swedish Heatseeker Chart.)	55	MC: Gold	Non-album singles
"Rescue Me" (featuring A Day to Remember)	2019	92	5	—	—	—	—	—	—	—	—		Joytime III
"One Thing Right" (with Kane Brown)	2019	36	—	4	71	12	71	—	— (Note: "One Thing Right" did not enter the NZ Top 40 Singles Chart, but peaked at number nine on the NZ Hot Singles Chart.)	92	76	RIAA: 5× Platinum; ARIA: 6× Platinum; BPI: Silver; GLF: Gold; MC: 9× Platinum; RMNZ: 2× Platinum	Non-album single
"Room to Fall" (with Flux Pavilion featuring Elohim)	2019	—	19	—	—	—	—	—	—	—	—		Joytime III
"Tongue Tied" (with Yungblud and Blackbear)	2019	— (Note: "Tongue Tied" did not enter the Billboard Hot 100, but peaked at number 14 on the Bubbling Under Hot 100 chart, which acts as a quasi-extension to the Hot 100.)	—	—	83	—	100	—	— (Note: "Tongue Tied" did not enter the NZ Top 40 Singles Chart, but peaked at number 12 on the NZ Hot Singles Chart.)	—	62		Non-album singles
"Crusade" (with Svdden Death)	2020	—	13	—	—	—	—	—	—	—	—		Non-album singles
"Been Thru This Before" (with Southside featuring Giggs and Saint Jhn)	2020	—	—	—	—	—	—	—	—	—	—		Non-album singles
"Be Kind" (with Halsey)	2020	29	—	15	— (Note: "Be Kind" did not enter the Flemish Ultratop 50, but peaked at number one on the Ultratip chart.)	18	54	29	32	48	33	RIAA: 2× Platinum; ARIA: Platinum; BPI: Gold; IFPI NOR: Gold; MC: 3× Platinum; RMNZ: Platinum	Manic and Collabs
"Come & Go" (with Juice Wrld)	2020	2	—	4	47	4	38	9	8	7	9	RIAA: 3× Platinum; ARIA: 2× Platinum; BPI: Platinum; BVMI: Gold; MC: 3× Platinum; RMNZ: 2× Platinum	Legends Never Die
"Baggin'" (with 42 Dugg)	2020	—	—	—	—	—	—	—	—	—	—		Non-album single
"OK Not to Be OK" (with Demi Lovato)	2020	36	2	47	— (Note: "OK Not to Be OK" did not enter the Flemish Ultratop 50, but peaked at number eight on the Ultratip chart.)	41	—	—	— (Note: "OK Not to Be OK" did not enter the NZ Top 40 Singles Chart, but peaked at number four on the NZ Hot Singles Chart.)	72	42	RMNZ: Gold	Dancing with the Devil... the Art of Starting Over
"Too Much" (with Imanbek featuring Usher)	2020	—	8	—	—	—	—	—	— (Note: "Too Much" did not enter the NZ Top 40 Singles Chart, but peaked at number 12 on the NZ Hot Singles Chart. The Alle Farben remix additionally peaked at number 31 on the NZ Hot Singles Chart.)	— (Note: "Too Much" did not enter the Swedish Singles Chart, but peaked at number 17 on the Swedish Heatseeker chart.)	—		Non-album single
"You" (with Benny Blanco and Vance Joy)	2021	—	—	55	46	62	—	—	— (Note: "You" did not enter the NZ Top 40 Singles Chart, but peaked at number two on the NZ Hot Singles Chart.)	38	—		Friends Keep Secrets 2
"Lavandia" (with Arash)	2021	—	—	—	—	—	—	—	—	—	—		Non-album single
"Like This" (with 2KBaby)	2021	—	—	—	—	—	—	—	— (Note: "Like This" did not enter the NZ Top 40 Singles Chart, but peaked at number 31 on the NZ Hot Singles Chart.)	—	—		First Quarter
"Do You Believe" (with Ali Gatie and Ty Dolla Sign)	2021	—	—	—	—	—	—	—	— (Note: "Do You Believe" did not enter the NZ Top 40 Singles Chart, but peaked at number 32 on the NZ Hot Singles Chart.)	—	—		The Idea of Her
"Leave Before You Love Me" (with Jonas Brothers)	2021	19	—	26	36	7	—	—	— (Note: "Leave Before You Love Me" did not enter the NZ Top 40 Singles Chart, but peaked at number 17 on the NZ Hot Singles Chart.)	—	24	RIAA: 2× Platinum; ARIA: 2× Platinum; BPI: Platinum; RMNZ: 3× Platinum	Non-album single
"Back in Time" (with Carnage)	2021	—	20	—	—	—	—	—	— (Note: "Back in Time" did not enter the NZ Top 40 Singles Chart, but peaked at number 40 on the NZ Hot Singles Chart.)	—	—		Shockwave
"Hitta" (with Eptic featuring Juicy J)	2021	—	—	—	—	—	—	—	—	—	—		Shockwave
"Bad Bitches" (with Nitti Gritti featuring Megan Thee Stallion)	2021	—	23	—	—	—	—	—	—	—	—		Shockwave
"House Party" (with Subtronics)	2021	—	31	—	—	—	—	—	—	—	—		Shockwave
"Chasing Stars" (with Alesso featuring James Bay)	2021	—	11	—	40	—	—	—	— (Note: "Chasing Stars" did not enter the NZ Top 40 Singles Chart, but peaked at number 15 on the NZ Hot Singles Chart. The VIP mix additionally peaked at number 38 on the NZ Hot Singles Chart.)	74	—		Non-album singles
"Preached" (with Lil Dusty G)	2021	—	—	—	—	—	—	—	— (Note: "Preached" did not enter the NZ Top 40 Singles Chart, but peaked at number 40 on the NZ Hot Singles Chart.)	—	—		Non-album singles
"Before U"	2022	—	—	—	—	—	—	—	—	—	—		Non-album singles
"Estilazo" (with Tokischa)	2022	—	—	—	—	—	—	—	—	—	—		Non-album singles
"Numb" (with Khalid)	2022	40	3	38	18	4	65	35	— (Note: "Numb" did not enter the NZ Top 40 Singles Chart, but peaked at number seven on the NZ Hot Singles Chart.)	26	—	RIAA: Platinum; ARIA: Platinum; BPI: Silver; GLF: Gold; MC: 2× Platinum; RMNZ: Platinum	Non-album singles
"Sah Sah" (with Nancy Ajram)	2022	—	38	—	—	—	—	—	—	—	—		Non-album singles
"American Psycho" (with Mae Muller and Trippie Redd)	2022	—	—	—	—	—	—	—	— (Note: "American Psycho" did not enter the NZ Top 40 Singles Chart, but peaked at number 34 on the NZ Hot Singles Chart.)	—	—		Non-album singles
"Bye Bye" (with Juice Wrld)	2022	53	—	67	—	36	46	—	— (Note: "Bye Bye" did not enter the NZ Top 40 Singles Chart, but peaked at number two on the NZ Hot Singles Chart.)	87	45	RIAA: Gold	Non-album singles
"Party Jumpin'" (with Jamie Brown)	2023	—	35	—	—	—	—	—	— (Note: "Party Jumpin'" did not enter the NZ Top 40 Singles Chart, but peaked at number 35 on the NZ Hot Singles Chart.)	—	—		Non-album singles
"Unity"	2023	—	—	—	—	—	—	—	—	—	—		Non-album singles
"Eternal"	2023	—	—	—	—	—	—	—	—	—	—		Non-album singles
"Again"	2023	—	—	—	—	—	—	—	—	—	—		Non-album singles
"Old School" (with Ray Volpe)	2023	—	31	—	—	—	—	—	—	—	—		Non-album singles
"El Merengue" (with Manuel Turizo)	2023	— (Note: "El Merengue" did not enter the Billboard Hot 100, but peaked at number 10 on the Bubbling Under Hot 100 chart, which acts as a quasi-extension to the Hot 100.)	5	—	—	50	—	—	—	—	—	RIAA: 6× Platinum (Latin); MC: Platinum	2000 and Sugar Papi
"Grown Man" (with Polo G and Southside)	2023	—	—	—	—	—	—	—	— (Note: "Grown Man" did not enter the NZ Top 40 Singles Chart, but peaked at number 13 on the NZ Hot Singles Chart.)	—	—		Non-album single
"Esta Vida" (with Farruko)	2023	—	10	—	37	—	—	—	—	—	—	RIAA: 2× Platinum (Latin)	Sugar Papi
"Fell in Love" (with Brent Faiyaz)	2023	— (Note: "Fell in Love" did not enter the Billboard Hot 100, but peaked at number 10 on the Bubbling Under Hot 100 chart, which acts as a quasi-extension to the Hot 100.)	—	—	—	96	—	—	— (Note: "Fell in Love" did not enter the NZ Top 40 Singles Chart, but peaked at number nine on the NZ Hot Singles Chart.)	—	—		Non-album single
"Solteiro Sou um Perigo" (with Tropkillaz and MC Delux)	2023	—	—	—	—	—	—	—	—	—	—		Mellokillaz
"Como Yo :(" (with Tiago PZK)	2023	—	33	—	—	—	—	—	—	—	—		Sugar Papi
"Tempo" (with Young Miko)	2023	—	26	—	—	—	—	—	—	—	—	RIAA: Platinum (Latin)	Sugar Papi
"Other Boys" (with Dove Cameron)	2023	—	9	—	—	—	—	—	— (Note: "Other Boys" did not enter the NZ Top 40 Singles Chart, but peaked at number 17 on the NZ Hot Singles Chart.)	—	—		Non-album single
"Harley Quinn" (with Fuerza Regida)	2023	40	—	—	—	—	—	—	—	—	—	RIAA: 27× Platinum (Latin)	Pa Las Baby's y Belikeada and Sugar Papi
"Dreaming" (with Pink and Sting)	2023	—	9	—	22	64	93	—	— (Note: "Dreaming" did not enter the NZ Top 40 Singles Chart, but peaked at number 13 on the NZ Hot Singles Chart.)	—	99		Trustfall: Tour Deluxe Edition
"No Man's Land" (with Venbee)	2024	—	16	—	—	—	—	—	— (Note: "No Man's Land" did not enter the NZ Top 40 Singles Chart, but peaked at number 17 on the NZ Hot Singles Chart.)	—	61		Non-album single
"Ceremony" (with Svdden Death)	2024	—	27	—	—	—	—	—	—	—	—		Mellodeath Tapes Vol. I
"Movement" (with Hol!)	2024	—	30	—	—	—	—	—	—	—	—		It's Riddim Time! and Brulure
"Triumphant" (with Svdden Death)	2024	—	40	—	—	—	—	—	—	—	—		Mellodeath Tapes Vol. I
"Conquer" (with Space Laces)	2024	—	25	—	—	—	—	—	— (Note: "Conquer" did not enter the NZ Top 40 Singles Chart, but peaked at number 35 on the NZ Hot Singles Chart.)	—	—		Non-album single
"Loaded" (with Infekt)	2024	—	—	—	—	—	—	—	—	—	—		It's Riddim Time!
"Shatter" (with Pyke)	2024	—	—	—	—	—	—	—	—	—	—		It's Riddim Time!
"Devastate"	2024	—	—	—	—	—	—	—	—	—	—		It's Riddim Time!
"Mellofire" (with Samplifire)	2024	—	—	—	—	—	—	—	—	—	—		It's Riddim Time!
"T34rs" (with BAW)	2024	—	—	—	—	—	—	—	—	—	—		It's Riddim Time!
"Miles on It" (with Kane Brown)	2024	15	1	59	13	10	—	—	— (Note: "Miles on It" did not enter the NZ Top 40 Singles Chart, but peaked at number 15 on the NZ Hot Singles Chart.)	—	44	RIAA: 4× Platinum; ARIA: Platinum; BPI: Gold; MC: 3× Platinum; RMNZ: Gold	The High Road
"Don't Speak" (with Sabrina Claudio)	2024	—	45	—	—	—	—	—	— (Note: "Don't Speak" did not enter the NZ Top 40 Singles Chart, but peaked at number 39 on the NZ Hot Singles Chart.)	—	—		Non-album single
"Forever" (with Pluko)	2024	—	—	—	—	—	—	—	—	—	—		The Roots
"In the Cut" (with Viperactive)	2024	—	—	—	—	—	—	—	—	—	—		The Roots
"Fired Up" (with Hamdi)	2024	—	—	—	—	—	—	—	—	—	—		The Roots
"Bad Boys" (with Trickstar and Lil Jon)	2024	—	—	—	—	—	—	—	—	—	—		The Roots
"Rave Repeater" (with Space Laces)	2024	—	—	—	—	—	—	—	—	—	—		Non-album single
"Slow Motion" (with Jonas Brothers)	2025	—	4	—	22	—	—	—	— (Note: "Slow Motion" did not enter the NZ Top 40 Singles Chart, but peaked at number 10 on the NZ Hot Singles Chart.)	— (Note: "Slow Motion" did not enter the Swedish Singellista Chart, but peaked at number nine on the Swedish Heatseeker Chart.)	—		Greetings from Your Hometown
"Fale Então" (with Trueno)	2025	—	23	—	—	—	—	—	—	—	—		Non-album singles
"Worlds Apart" (with AR/CO)	2025	—	17	—	—	—	—	—	—	—	—		Non-album singles
"Save My Love" (with Ellie Goulding and Avaion)	2025	—	5	—	—	—	—	—	— (Note: "Save My Love" did not enter the NZ Top 40 Singles Chart, but peaked at number 19 on the NZ Hot Singles Chart.)	—	—		Non-album singles
"Holy Water" (with Jelly Roll)	2025	79	—	—	15	77	—	—	— (Note: "Holy Water" did not enter the NZ Top 40 Singles Chart, but peaked at number 9 on the NZ Hot Singles Chart.)	—	—		Non-album singles
"Better Man Than Me" (featuring Hudson Westbrook)	2025	—	—	—	—	—	—	—	—	—	—		Non-album singles
"Kissin' My Friends" (with INJI)	2025	—	—	—	—	—	—	—	—	—	—		Non-album singles
"We Don't Get Along" (with Juice WRLD)	2026	— (Note: "We Don't Get Along" did not enter the Billboard Hot 100, but peaked at number 2 on the Bubbling Under Hot 100 chart, which acts as a quasi-extension to the Hot 100.)	—	—	—	—	—	—	—	—	—		Non-album singles
"Phoenix" (with Portugal. The Man)	2026	—	13	—	—	—	—	—	—	—	—		Non-album singles
"Where We Go" (with Thomas Rhett)	2026	—	5	—	—	—	—	—	— (Note: "Where We Go" did not enter the NZ Top 40 Singles Chart, but peaked at number 27 on the NZ Hot Singles Chart.)	—	—		Non-album singles
"Another Drink" (with Kelsea Ballerini)	2026	60	2	—	25	83	—	—	— (Note: "Another Drink" did not enter the NZ Top 40 Singles Chart, but it peaked at number 14 on the NZ Hot Singles Chart.)	—	—		Non-album singles
"Hollow" (with Cameron Whitcomb)	2026	—	15	—	—	85	—	—	— (Note: "Hollow" did not enter the NZ Top 40 Singles Chart, but peaked at number 29 on the NZ Hot 40 Singles Chart.)	—	—		Non-album singles
"Close My Eyes" (with Illenium and Sacha)	2026	—	13	—	—	—	—	—	— (Note: "Close My Eyes" did not enter the NZ Top 40 Singles Chart, but peaked at number 34 on the NZ Hot Singles Chart.)	—	—		Non-album singles
"—" denotes items which were not released in that country or failed to chart.

=== As featured artist ===
List of singles as featured artist, showing year released, selected chart position and album name
Title	Year	Charts	Album
Title	Year	US Dance	Album
As Dotcom
"Tempura Roll" (Yultron featuring Ookay, Kayzo, and Dotcom)	2016	—	Sushi, Friends & Everything Awesome
As Marshmello
"There x2" (Slushii featuring Marshmello)	2018	31	Non-album single

=== As Dotcom ===
Title	Year	Label	Album
"Drop. Blast." (with Logun)	2013	Self-released	Non-album singles
"Chain Swangin'"	2013	Self-released	Non-album singles
"Dump Truck"	2013	Self-released	Non-album singles
"Drunk Girls" (featuring Yultron)	2014	Self-released	Non-album singles
"Michael Myers"	2014	Self-released	Non-album singles
"Nope" (with Borgore featuring Shaygray)	2015	Buygore Records	The Buygore Album
"Bass Rocker"	2015	Self-released	Non-album singles
"Make It Go"	2015	Self-released	Non-album singles
"Take a Picture" (with Kayzo featuring Sam King)	2015	Self-released	Non-album singles
"Gang Shit" (featuring Lil Toe)	2019	Self-released	Non-album singles

== Other charted songs ==
List of songs, with selected chart positions, showing year released and album name
Title	Year	Charts							Certifications	Album
Title	Year	US	US Dance	US R&B /HH	AUS	CAN	CZR	NZ Hot	Certifications	Album
"Summer"	2016	—	20	—	—	—	—	—		Joytime
"Find Me"	2016	—	16	—	—	—	—	—		Joytime
"Blocks"	2016	—	25	—	—	—	—	—		Joytime
"Danger" (with Migos)	2017	82	—	34	—	49	—	—	RIAA: Platinum	Bright: The Album
"Rooftops"	2018	—	26	—	—	—	—	—		Joytime II
"Stars"	2018	—	31	—	—	—	—	—		Joytime II
"Together"	2018	—	20	—	—	—	—	—		Joytime II
"Power"	2018	—	24	—	—	—	—	—		Joytime II
"Paralyzed"	2018	—	30	—	—	—	—	—		Joytime II
"Flashbacks"	2018	—	32	—	—	—	—	—		Joytime II
"Down"	2019	—	28	—	—	—	—	—		Joytime III
"Run It Up"	2019	—	29	—	—	—	—	—		Joytime III
"Put Yo Hands Up" (with Slushii)	2019	—	36	—	—	—	—	—		Joytime III
"Sad Songs"	2019	—	39	—	—	—	—	—		Joytime III
"Earthquake" (with Tynan)	2019	—	48	—	—	—	—	—		Joytime III
"Falling to Pieces" (with Crankdat)	2019	—	38	—	—	—	—	—		Joytime III
"Here We Go Again"	2019	—	50	—	—	—	—	—		Joytime III
"Proud"	2019	—	14	—	—	—	—	24		Joytime III
"Hate the Other Side" (with Juice Wrld featuring Polo G and The Kid Laroi)	2020	10	—	8	15	12	—	3	RIAA: Platinum; BPI: Silver; RMNZ: Gold	Legends Never Die
"Feel Something" (The Kid Laroi featuring Marshmello)	2020	— (Note: "Feel Something" did not enter the Billboard Hot 100, but peaked at number 13 on the Bubbling Under Hot 100 chart, which acts as a quasi-extension to the Hot 100.)	—	—	78	93	—	—	RIAA: Gold; MC: Gold	F*ck Love (Savage)
"Fairytale"	2021	—	32	—	—	—	—	—		Shockwave
"Supernovacane"	2021	—	38	—	—	—	—	—		Shockwave
"Jiggle It" (with TroyBoi)	2021	—	34	—	—	—	—	—		Shockwave
"Vibr8"	2021	—	47	—	—	—	—	—		Shockwave
"Shockwave"	2021	—	11	—	—	—	—	—		Shockwave
"Alcohol" (with Anuel AA)	2023	—	36	—	—	—	—	—		Sugar Papi
"Lights On" (with Faangs)	2024	—	45	—	—	—	—	—		The Roots
"Closer" (with Maroon 5)	2025	—	—	—	—	—	9	—		Love Is Like (Deluxe Digital Edition)
"—" denotes items which were not released in that country or failed to chart.

== Other appearances ==
List of non-single songs which do not feature on an album by Marshmello
Title	Year	Artist	Album(s)
"Danger"	2017	Migos	Bright: The Album
"Hate the Other Side"	2020	Juice Wrld, Polo G, The Kid Laroi	Legends Never Die
"Feel Something"	2020	The Kid Laroi	F*ck Love (Savage)
"Watch Your Man"	2022	Rico Nasty	Las Ruinas

== Remixes ==
List of remixes, showing year released and original artist(s)
Title	Year	Original artist(s)
As Dotcom
I Don't Like (Aylen and Dotcom Remix)	2012	Chief Keef (featuring Lil Reese)
Ridin' (Dotcom Remix)	2012	Chamillionaire
Talk That Talk (Dotcom Remix)	2013	Rihanna (featuring Jay-Z)
Hate Bein' Sober (Dotcom Remix)	2013	Chief Keef (featuring 50 Cent & Wiz Khalifa)
Stay the Night (Dotcom Remix)	2013	Zedd (featuring Hayley Williams)
Human (Dotcom Remix)	2013	Krewella
Cashin' Out (Dotcom Festival Trap Remix)	2013	Cash Out
Clappers (Dotcom Remix)	2014	Wale
Turn Down For What (Dotcom's Retwerk)	2014	DJ Snake (featuring Lil Jon)
Type of Way (Dotcom Remix)	2014	Rich Homie Quan
Unicorn Zombie Apocalypse (Dotcom Remix)	2014	Borgore & Sikdope
How We Party (Dotcom WTF Trap Remix)	2014	R3hab & Vinai
Bricks (Dotcom Remix)	2014	Carnage (featuring Migos)
Bang It To The Curb (Dotcom Remix)	2014	Far East Movement & Sidney Samson
As Marshmello
"Outside" (Marshmello Remix) (Note: Adapted from Marshmello on SoundCloud)	2015	Calvin Harris (featuring Ellie Goulding)
"I Want You to Know" (Marshmello Remix)	2015	Zedd (featuring Selena Gomez)
"Beautiful Now" (Marshmello Remix)	2015	Zedd (featuring Jon Bellion)
"One Last Time" (Marshmello Remix)	2015	Ariana Grande
"Waiting For Love" (Marshmello Remix)	2015	Avicii
"Where Are Ü Now" (Marshmello Remix)	2015	Jack Ü (with Justin Bieber)
"Hello" (Marshmello Remix)	2015	Adele
"Need U (100%)" (Jauz and Marshmello Remix)	2015	Duke Dumont (featuring A*M*E)
"Flash Funk" (Marshmello Remix)	2016	Riot Games Music Team
"Want U 2" (Marshmello and Slushii Remix)	2016	Marshmello
"BonBon" (Marshmello Remix)	2016	Era Istrefi
"Alarm" (Marshmello Remix)	2016	Anne-Marie
"Sing Me to Sleep" (Marshmello Remix)	2016	Alan Walker
"Let Me Love You" (Marshmello Remix)	2016	DJ Snake (featuring Justin Bieber)
"Make Me (Cry)" (Marshmello Remix)	2017	Noah Cyrus (featuring Labrinth)
"Mask Off" (Marshmello Remix)	2017	Future

== Music videos ==
List of music videos as lead artist, showing year released, directors, producers and references
Title	Year	Director/Producer	Ref
"Keep it Mello" (featuring Omar LinX)	2016	Steve Conry, Joe Zohar	
"Alone"	2016	Daniel Burke	
"Ritual" (featuring Wrabel)	2016	Andrew Donoho	
"Summer"	2016	Daniel Burke	
"Moving On"	2017	Daniel Burke	
"Find Me"	2017	Daniel Burke	
"Wolves" (Vertical Video) (with Selena Gomez)	2017	Harry McNally	
"You & Me"	2017	Toon53 Productions	
"Blocks"	2017	Daniel Burke	
"Wolves" (with Selena Gomez)	2017	Colin Tilley	
"Danger" (with Migos)	2017	RJ Sanchez, Brendan Vaughan	
"Take It Back"	2017	Daniel Burke	
"Love U"	2018	Toon53 Productions	
"Spotlight" (with Lil Peep)	2018	Nick Koenig	
"Friends" (with Anne-Marie)	2018	Hannah Lux Davis	
"Friends" (Alternative Music Video) (with Anne-Marie)	2018	Daniel Malikyar	
"Fly" (featuring Leah Culver)	2018	Thomy Hoefer	
"Everyday" (with Logic)	2018	Alan Ferguson	
"You Can Cry" (with Juicy J featuring James Arthur)	2018	Daniel Malikyar	
"Fly" (DuckTales Music Video) (featuring Leah Culver)	2018	Disney Channel	
"Flashbacks"	2018	Mercedes Bryce Morgan	
"Stars"	2018	Toby Wosskow	
"Happier" (with Bastille)	2018	Mercedes Bryce Morgan	
"Check This Out"	2018	Mercedes Bryce Morgan	
"Happier" (Stripped Music Video) (with Bastille)	2018	Daniel Malikyar	
"Together"	2018	Toby Wosskow	
"Happier" (Alternate Music Video) (with Bastille)	2018	Daniel Malikyar, Karam Gill	
"Project Dreams" (with Roddy Ricch)	2018	Austin Winchell	
"Biba" (featuring Shirley Setia and Shah Rukh Khan)	2019	Punit Malhotra	
"Here with Me" (Alternative Music Video) (featuring Chvrches)	2019	Daniel Malikyar, Karam Gill	
"Tell Me"	2019	Karl Jungquist	
"Here with Me" (featuring Chvrches)	2019	Mercedes Bryce Morgan	
"Power"	2019	Mercedes Bryce Morgan	
"Rooftops"	2019	Philip Vernon	
"Light It Up" (with Tyga and Chris Brown)	2019	Arrad	
"Paralyzed"	2019	Daniel Burke	
"Imagine"	2019	Daniel Burke	
"First Place" (with SOB X RBE)	2019	Dave Apruzzese	
"Rescue Me" (featuring A Day to Remember)	2019	Philip Vernon	
"Don't Save Me" (with SOB X RBE)	2019	Yasha Gruben	
"Roll the Dice" (with SOB X RBE)	2019	Adam McClaughry	
"One Thing Right" (with Kane Brown)	2019	Robert Hales	
"Tongue Tied" (with Yungblud and Blackbear)	2019	Christian Breslauer	
"Crusade" (with Svdden Death)	2020	Toon53 Productions	
"Been Thru This Before" (with Southside featuring Giggs and Saint Jhn)	2020	Myles Whittingham	
"Be Kind" (with Halsey)	2020	Hannah Lux Davis	
"OK Not to Be OK" (with Demi Lovato)	2020	Hannah Lux Davis	

== Production credits ==
List of production credits, with artist name, showing year released and album name
Title	Year	Artist(s)	Album
"Church"	2016	Far East Movement (featuring Elijah Blake)	Identity
"Reverse"	2018	Vic Mensa (featuring G-Eazy)	—N/a
"Broken & Beautiful"	2019	Kelly Clarkson	UglyDolls (Original Motion Picture Soundtrack)
"Wow"	2019	Zara Larsson	Poster Girl
"Stan By Me"	2020	G-Eazy	Everything's Strange Here
"Jerk"	2020	Oliver Tree	Ugly Is Beautiful
"Half Alive"	2020	Blackbear	Everything Means Nothing
"Umbrella"	2021	Wacotron featuring G Herbo	—N/a
"SOS"	2023	Seventeen	Seventeenth Heaven

== Notes ==
Charts

Credits
