= Marshmello Fortnite Extended Set =

Remix album by Marshmello
- Released: February 2, 2019
- Label: Joytime Collective
- Producer: Marshmello

Marshmello chronology
Joytime II (2018)	Marshmello Fortnite Extended Set (2019)	Roll the Dice (2019)

Marshmello Fortnite Extended Set is the debut mix album by American DJ and record producer Marshmello. It was released on February 2, 2019. This album won the Billboard Music Award for Best Electronic Album in 2020.

== Background ==
Marshmello played a concert for Fortnite in February 2019, an extended version of the set being exclusively released to Apple Music the same month.

== Commercial performance ==
The album topped the US Top Dance/Electronic Albums chart.

It also won the best Dance/Electronic Album at the 2020 Billboard Music Awards.

== Track listing ==
Marshmello Fortnite Extended Set track listing
No.	Title	Artists	Length
1.	"Wolves" (Marshmello Intro Edit)	Marshmello and Selena Gomez	1:57
2.	"Poppin"	Rickyxsan	0:35
3.	"Gassed Up"	Jauz and DJ Snake	0:30
4.	"The Drop" (4B & Nvrleft Remix)	Gammer	0:42
5.	"Waiting for Love" (Marshmello Remix)	Avicii	1:05
6.	"Check This Out"	Marshmello	0:39
7.	"Want U 2"	Marshmello	0:38
8.	"Everyday"	Marshmello and Logic	1:42
9.	"Power"	Marshmello	0:41
10.	"Fly"	Marshmello featuring Leah Culver	0:52
11.	"Light" (Crankdat Re-Crank)	San Holo	1:32
12.	"Moving On"	Marshmello	0:41
13.	"Alone"	Marshmello	4:25
14.	"Chasing Colors"	Marshmello and Ookay featuring Noah Cyrus	1:29
15.	"Flashbacks"	Marshmello	0:31
16.	"Pop Dat"	4B and Aazar	0:34
17.	"Behemoth"	Svdden Death	0:39
18.	"Reddy the Throne"	Spag Heddy featuring PsoGnar	0:45
19.	"I Hold Still"	Jauz and Crankdat featuring Slushii	0:44
20.	"Make It Pop"	Nonsens	0:30
21.	"Deep Down Low"	Valentino Khan	0:36
22.	"Giant Mouse"	AC Slater and Chris Lorenzo	0:37
23.	"Jungle Bae" (VIP)	Jack Ü featuring Bunji Garlin	0:37
24.	"Losing It"	Fisher	1:05
25.	"Bomb a Drop"	Garmiani	0:34
26.	"Party Up" (GTA Remix)	Destructo featuring YG	1:25
27.	"Happier"	Marshmello and Bastille	3:37

== Charts ==
=== Weekly charts ===
Weekly chart performance for Marshmello Fortnite Extended Set
Chart (2019)	Peak position
Canadian Albums (Billboard)	31
US Billboard 200	45
US Top Dance Albums (Billboard)	1

=== Year-end charts ===
Year-end chart performance for Marshmello Fortnite Extended Set
Chart (2019)	Position
US Billboard 200	143
US Top Dance/Electronic Albums (Billboard)	1
Chart (2020)	Position
US Top Dance/Electronic Albums (Billboard)	3
Chart (2021)	Position
US Top Dance/Electronic Albums (Billboard)	5
Chart (2022)	Position
US Top Dance/Electronic Albums (Billboard)	8
Chart (2023)	Position
US Top Dance/Electronic Albums (Billboard)	16
Chart (2024)	Position
US Top Dance/Electronic Albums (Billboard)	20
