= Ritual (Marshmello song) =

Single by Marshmello featuring Wrabel
- Released: November 1, 2016
- Recorded: 2016
- Genre: Dance-pop
- Length: 3:57
- Label: Owsla
- Songwriters: Marshmello, Stephen Wrabel, Morgan Taylor Reid, Annaliese Schiersch
- Producers: Marshmello, Morgan Taylor Reid

Marshmello singles chronology
"Freal Luv" (2016)	"Ritual" (2016)	"Chasing Colors" (2017)

Music video
- "Ritual" on YouTube

"Ritual" is a song by American electronic dance music producer and DJ Marshmello, featuring American musician Wrabel. It was released on November 1, 2016, and marked his first release on American record label Owsla. The song appeared on the charts in the US and Canada, peaking at number 8 in the US Dance/Electronic Digital Song Sales chart. The song was also renowned for its music video, due to its copyright dispute by Canadian electronic music producer Deadmau5.

== Music video ==
A still from the original music video for "Ritual"

On November 1, 2016, Marshmello released the original music video for "Ritual". The video was directed by Andrew Donoho and released on Owsla's YouTube channel, of which the upload has amassed over 50 million views. The video was also uploaded onto Marshmello's own YouTube channel. EDM Artists Skrillex, Slushii and Valentino Khan were featured on the video.

=== Deadmau5 dispute ===
The music video for "Ritual" originally briefly featured an interpretation of Canadian electronic music producer and DJ Deadmau5's "mau5head" logo (with a third ear as a Mohawk) being worn by a fan. This was disputed by Deadmau5, who claimed "I'd rather be associated with a pile of dog shit". On November 3, 2016, the music video was reuploaded with the disputed scene removed. However, the original upload remains on record label Owsla's YouTube channel, but is currently unlisted.

Marshmello had previously referenced Deadmau5, in the music video for "Alone", which features Marshmello's pet mouse, Joel (Deadmau5's real name).

== Track listing ==
Digital download
No.	Title	Length
1.	"Ritual" (featuring Wrabel)	4:33

== Charts ==
=== Weekly charts ===
Chart (2016)	Peak position
Canada Hot 100 (Billboard)	82
US Hot Dance/Electronic Songs (Billboard)	11

=== Year-end charts ===
Chart (2017)	Position
US Hot Dance/Electronic Songs (Billboard)	38
