= Shockwave (Marshmello song) =

2021 Shockwave by Marshmello

Song by Marshmello

from the album Shockwave
- Released: June 11, 2021
- Length: 3:01
- Label: Joytime Collective; Geffen
- Composer: Christopher Comstock

Music video
- "Shockwave" on YouTube

"Shockwave" is a song featured on American electronic music producer and DJ Marshmello's fourth studio album Shockwave. It was released on June 11, 2021 via Joytime Collective/Geffen Records.

== Background ==
"Shockwave" is the last track of the album. Matt Sierra of EDM Tunes commented that the track "blends the old school Marshmello sound, with some vocals, and some grit".

== Charts ==
=== Weekly charts ===
Weekly chart performance for "Shockwave"
Chart (2021)	Peak position
US Hot Dance/Electronic Songs (Billboard)	11

=== Year-end charts ===
Year-end chart performance for "Shockwave"
Chart (2021)	Position
US Hot Dance/Electronic Songs (Billboard)	83
