= Find Me (Marshmello song) =

2016 song by Marshmello

Song by Marshmello

from the album Joytime
- Released: January 8, 2016
- Length: 3:00
- Label: Joytime Collective

Music video
- "Find Me" on YouTube

"Find Me" is a song by American electronic music producer and DJ Marshmello, it was released from his debut studio album Joytime, released on January 8, 2016, via Joytime Collective.

== Music video ==
The music video was released on August 5, 2017. According to the description by Huch Flynn of We Rave You, it sets that Marshmello joins a college party, he "keeps his eyes targeted on the younger audience". Subsequently, he "goes from being teased to becoming the life of the party". Reviewer also praised the video "combine[s] a ton of Twinkies, dancing, partying, and a powerful feeling of unity, the “Find Me” music video might be [his] best design yet."

== Charts ==
=== Weekly charts ===
Weekly chart performance for "Find Me"
| Chart (2017) | Peak position |
|---|---|
| US Hot Dance/Electronic Songs (Billboard) | 16 |

=== Year-end charts ===
Year-end chart performance for "Find Me"
| Chart (2017) | Position |
|---|---|
| US Hot Dance/Electronic Songs (Billboard) | 82 |
