= Joytime =

Studio album by Marshmello
- Released: January 8, 2016
- Recorded: 2016
- Genre: Future bass
- Length: 35:03
- Label: Joytime Collective
- Producer: Marshmello

Marshmello chronology
Right (2015)	Joytime (2016)	Joytime II (2018)

Singles from Joytime
- 1. "Keep It Mello" Released: January 8, 2016

Joytime is the debut studio album by American DJ and record producer Marshmello, which was self-released through his label, Joytime Collective on January 8, 2016. When it was released, it landed on the iTunes top electronic albums on the first day.

== Singles ==
The first single "Keep It Mello", featuring vocals from rapper Omar LinX, was released on January 8, 2016.

A remix by Marshmello and Slushii of "Want U 2", a song from the album, was released as a single but not in promotion of the album.

== Critical reception ==
Ryan James Blair of Festival Forecast gave Joytime a 7.5/10 rating, stating "Joytime starts strong with a screeching synth, mallet melodies, and a smooth bass as he [Marshmello] taunts listeners with the vocal hook (Everybody Knows Me.... Marshmello)." The rest of Joytime does not vary much from the opening track as each song sticks to the strong formula that includes a smooth bass line, sharp synths, simple risers and percussion buildups, trap hats and strong kicks. 'Summer' is perhaps the biggest change of pace with a nice downtempo beat, but at times the sub bass can almost be overwhelming for the slower tempo and context."

== Track listing ==
Joytime
No.	Title	Length
1.	"Know Me"	3:26
2.	"Summer"	3:53
3.	"Find Me"	3:00
4.	"Take It Back"	3:53
5.	"Bounce"	3:32
6.	"Blocks"	3:29
7.	"Show You"	2:57
8.	"Want U 2"	3:02
9.	"Home"	3:48
10.	"Keep It Mello" (featuring Omar Linx)	4:03
Total length:		35:03

== Personnel ==
Credits adapted from Tidal.

Performers

- Marshmello – vocals, production, mixing, recording
- Omar LinX – rapping

== Charts ==
=== Weekly charts ===
Chart (2016)	Peak position
US Top Dance Albums (Billboard)	5
US Heatseekers Albums (Billboard)	14
US Independent Albums (Billboard)	41

=== Year-end charts ===
Chart (2017)	Position
US Top Dance/Electronic Albums (Billboard)	22
