= Zeds Dead =

Canadian electronic music duo

- Origin: Toronto, Ontario, Canada
- Genres: EDM; deep house; drum and bass; drumstep; electro house; garage; trap; glitch; hip hop; dubstep
- Years active: 2009–present
- Labels: EllK; Ultra; Spinnin'; Deadbeats; Altered States
- Members: Dylan Mamid; Zachary Rapp-Rovan
- Website: zedsdead.net

Zeds Dead is a Canadian electronic music duo from Toronto consisting of Dylan Mamid, also known as DC, and Zachary Rapp-Rovan, also known as Hooks. The duo rose to prominence releasing original music and remixes from 2009 to 2010 before becoming a staple on the international touring circuit thereafter. They explore a diverse variety of genres that combine aspects of dubstep, UK garage, house, electro house, hip-hop, glitch, drum and bass, and more.

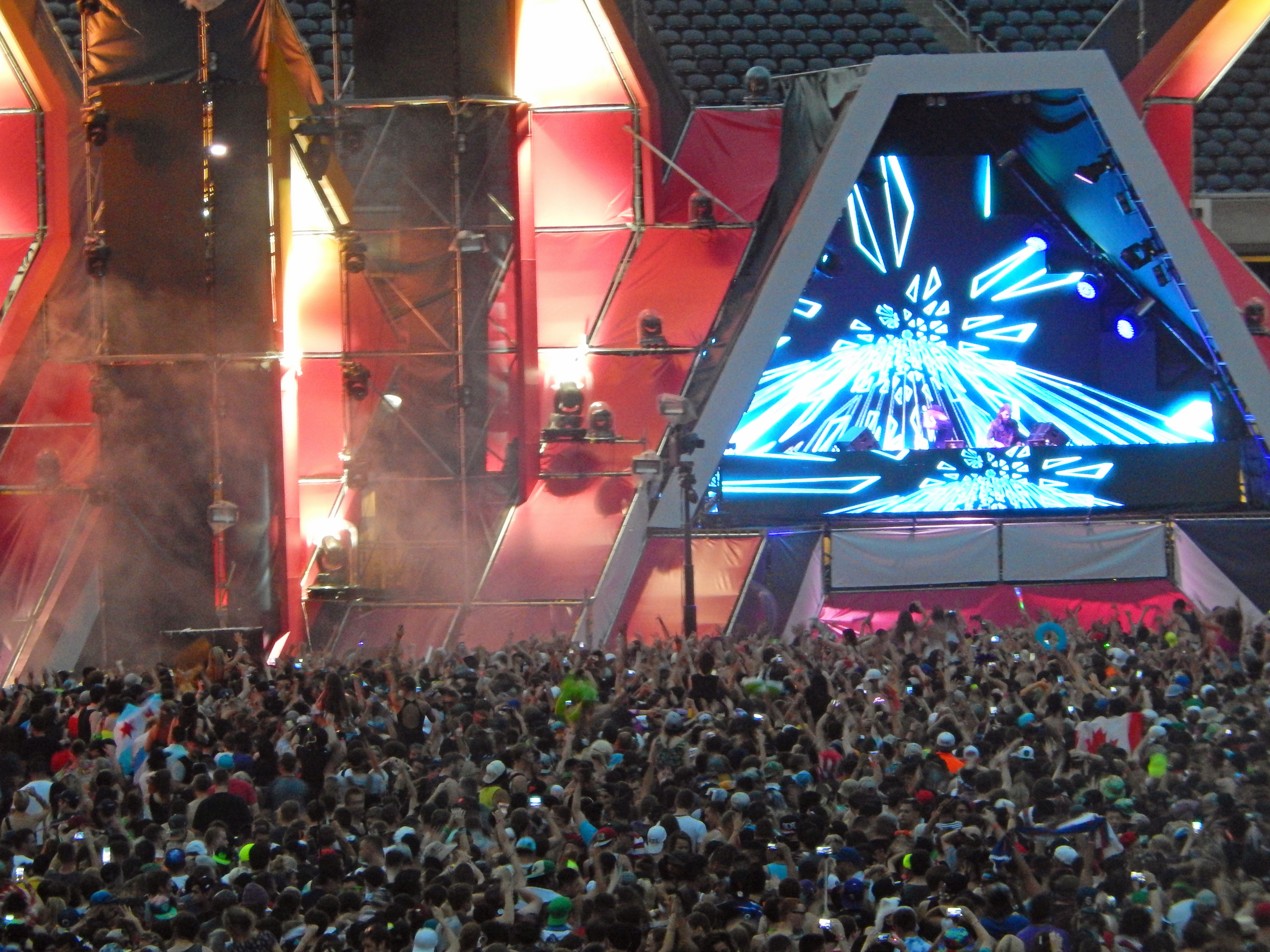
Spring Awakening Music Festival, Chicago in 2015

== Career ==
Both born and raised in Toronto, Canada, the duo were introduced through mutual friends in 2004 when DC asked Hooks to paint a graffiti mural in his garage. They quickly discovered a mutual love for hip-hop and simultaneously were both starting to produce music. Initially collaborating under the moniker "Mass Productions", the duo came up with their current name from a line spoken by Bruce Willis's character Butch Coolidge to his girlfriend Fabienne (played by Maria de Medeiros) in the 1994 Quentin Tarantino film Pulp Fiction.

=== Group name ===
The "Who's Zed?" line from Pulp Fiction opens most of their live shows, either via spoken word or visual movie clip:

- "Butch, whose motorcycle is this?"
- "It's a chopper, baby."
- "Whose chopper is this?"
- "It's Zed's."
- "Who's Zed?"
- "Zed's dead, baby. Zed’s dead."

=== Mass Productions (2006–2007) ===
In the summer of 2007, Mass Productions independently released their first and only official release, which was heavily influenced by 1990s hip hop. However, Mass Productions did not garner much attention outside of the local scene.

=== Formation of Zeds Dead (2009–2010) ===
DC and Hooks both began to take an interest in electronic music and began producing dance music under the name, Zeds Dead. The group initially found a niche audience on Myspace.

Zeds Dead self-released their first track together, "Journey of a Lifetime", for free. They played their first live set at The Social in Toronto on June 11, 2009.

=== Bassmentality (2009–2013) ===
In 2009, Zeds Dead founded a weekly party called Bassmentality in the basement of the Toronto bar, 751. The party was intended as a venue for new DJs to play, unrestricted by concert promoters. In the summer of 2010, Bassmentality moved from the basement of 751 and into Toronto's Wrongbar.

Bassmentality featured weekly performances from its founders, Zeds Dead and The Killabits, as well as rotating slots of local and international acts. Over the four years that the event existed, it hosted early performances from several now-acclaimed artists such as Skrillex, Borgore, Nero, Camo & Krooked, Bare Noize, and Bar 9, among others.

In 2011, Zeds Dead released the track "Bassmentality" with The Killabits, named after the event.

=== Early touring (2009–2010) ===
Zeds Dead began their first official North American tour in December 2010, playing over 40 shows in Canada and the United States. They made their European debut in June 2010 in the UK, playing a string of dates around the electronic music festival Gottwood in Wales. The Graveyard Tour in 2011 was the first tour of its scale for Zeds Dead. From September to December, the duo played over 50 dates across North America.

=== International touring and releases (since 2011) ===
==== Victor EP ====
The Victor EP was released in March 2012 on Mad Decent's Jeffree's label. The album was a collaboration between Zeds Dead and Toronto-based artist Omar LinX. It featured Omar's rap vocals over seven Zeds Dead tracks. DatPiff called the album "[a fusion between] nostalgic 90s sample-based hip hop [and] futuristic bass [with] cinematic soundscapes."

The music video for the single "You and I" was shot throughout North America during the Living Dead Tour and received over 21 million plays on YouTube.

==== The Living Dead EP ====
The Living Dead EP was released in July 2012 on Ultra Records and was the second collaborative album with Omar LinX released that year. A music video was released for the title track on July 12. The video featured actor Peter Greene, who played the character Zed in Quentin Tarantino's Pulp Fiction, the film that inspired the duo's name.

==== Hot Sauce EP ====
The Hot Sauce EP was released in January 2013 on Diplo's Mad Decent label. The EP was noted as a breakout album for the group. The first single, "Demons", had a music video made directed by Benjamin Millepied, the dancer who choreographed Darren Aronofsky's 2010 film, Black Swan. The video reinterprets Michael Jackson's "Thriller". The single was also featured in the video game Saints Row IV, and the film Step Up: All In.

Zeds Dead received a cease and desist order from the hot sauce manufacturer Tabasco regarding the album's original artwork. Tabasco believed the artwork to be overly similar to their branding. Zeds Dead was subsequently forced to remove all original art and promotional videos for the album.

==== Somewhere Else EP ====
Zeds Dead released the Somewhere Else EP in July 2014 on Mad Decent. The album contains collaborations and features with Twin Shadow, D'Angelo Lacy, Omar LinX, Big Gigantic, Bright Lights, Sean Price, Perry Farrell, and Dirtyphonics. Somewhere Else charted on several Billboard charts upon release, including the Billboard 200.

Prior to its release, the single "Lost You" featuring Twin Shadow & D'Angelo Lacy was intentionally leaked online by Zeds Dead through a Craigslist missed connections ad in which users were sent a short clip of the video upon responding. In May 2015, the video for "Lost You" received an MMVA nomination for best EDM/Dance video and won the award for Best Post-Production.

==== 2 Night Stand Tour ====
In 2015, Billboard exclusively announced Zeds Dead's 2 Night Stand Tour, and plans for a new album in 2016. The tour aimed to take the duo off the festival circuit and place them in historically significant venues in major North American cities for two nights each.

A portion of the proceeds from the 2 Night Stand tour went to benefit the Florida rehab clinic Recovery Unplugged.

On the Austin stop of the 2 Night Stand tour, Zeds Dead attached heart rate monitors to four fans during their set and analyzed the results. The test concluded that there was a clear rise in heart rate during the performance and a correlation of heart rate peaks during key points in the set.

=== Record label and debut album (2016) ===
==== Deadbeats ====
On March 1, 2016, Zeds Dead announced they had launched their own record label, Deadbeats, alongside the release of a new track "Back Home" featuring Freddie Gibbs.

==== Northern Lights ====
On October 14, 2016, Zeds Dead released their debut full-length album Northern Lights through their label Deadbeats, and subsequently embarked on a tour of the same name. The album has a wide variety of features including Rivers Cuomo and Pusha T on "Too Young", and Diplo and Elliphant on "Blame".

=== Record label and debut album (since 2021) ===
==== Altered States ====
In March 2021, Zeds Dead announced the debut of their new label, Altered States, along with a new logo. The first release was an original Zeds Dead mixtape called Catching Z's.

== Discography ==
=== Studio albums ===
Title	Details	Peak chart positions		
Title	Details	CAN	US Heat	US Dance
Northern Lights	Release date: October 14, 2016; Label: Deadbeats; Format: Digital download, vinyl	30	5	6
We Are Deadbeats Vol.4	Release date: January 14, 2020; Label: Deadbeats; Format: Digital download, vinyl	—	—	—
Return to the Spectrum of Intergalactic Happiness	Release date: March 7, 2025; Label: Deadbeats; Format: Digital download, vinyl	—	—	—
Return to the Return (of the Spectrum of Intergalactic Happiness)	Release date: June 30, 2026; Label: Deadbeats; Format: Digital download	—	—	—

=== Remix albums ===
Title	Details
Somewhere Else Remixes	Release date: May 12, 2015; Label: Mad Decent; Format: Digital download
Northern Lights Remixes	Release date: June 9, 2017; Label: Deadbeats; Format: Digital download
We Are Deadbeats Vol.4 – Deluxe	Release date: July 24, 2020; Label: Deadbeats; Format: Digital download

=== Mixtapes ===
Title	Details
Catching Z's	Release date: March 26, 2021; Label: Altered States; Format: Digital download, vinyl

=== Extended plays ===
Title	Details	Peak chart positions			
Title	Details	US Dance	US Indie	US Heat	US 200
Rudeboy	Release date: December 6, 2010; Label: San City High; Format: Digital download	—	—	—	—
Rumble in the Jungle EP	Release date: October 4, 2011; Label: Mad Decent; Format: Digital download	—	—	—	—
Adrenaline	Release date: January 23, 2012; Label: Inspected; Format: Digital download	11	—	15	—
Victor (with Omar Linx)	Release date: March 20, 2012; Label: Mad Decent / Jeffrees; Format: Digital download	—	—	—	—
The Living Dead (with Omar Linx)	Release date: July 24, 2012; Label: Ultra; Format: Digital download	—	—	42	—
Hot Sauce	Release date: January 29, 2013; Label: Mad Decent; Format: Digital download	13	34	6	—
Somewhere Else	Release date: July 1, 2014; Label: Mad Decent; Format: Digital download, vinyl	4	18	2	136
Catching Z's (Remixes)	Release date: August 20, 2021; Label: Altered States; Format: Digital download	—	—	—	—

=== Singles ===
2009

- "Journey of a Lifetime" [Deadbeats]
- "Dark Side Dub" [Self-released]
- "Pulp Fiction" [Big In Ibiza]

2010

- "Wake Up" (with Omar LinX) [Self-released]
- "Here Comes the Boom" [Self-released]
- "White Satin" [Self-released]
- "Out for Blood" (featuring Omar LinX) [Self-released] (Victor)
- "Rude Boy" [San City High] (Rude Boy) / (Victor)

2011

- "1975" [Self-released]
- "The Twilight Zone" [Self-released]
- "Coffee Break" [Self-released]
- "Bassmentality" (with The Killabits) [Zeds Dead Inc]
- "Ruckus the Jam" [Dim Mak]

2012

- "The Living Dead" (with Omar LinX) [Ultra Records] (The Living Dead)

2013

- "Cowboy" (with Omar LinX) [Ultra Records] (The Living Dead)
- "Ratchet" [Self-released]
- "By Your Side" [Self-released]
- "Jericho" (featuring Memorecks) [Self-released]
- "Shut Up and Sing" (featuring Greta Svabo Bech) [Greta Svabo Bech Records]
- "Turn Around" (with Major Lazer featuring Elephant Man) [Self-released]

2014

- "Hadouken" [Mad Decent] (Somewhere Else)
- "Loud" (with Hunter Siegel) [Self-released]
- "Lost You" (featuring Twin Shadow and D'Angelo Lacy) [Ultra Music] (Somewhere Else) MC platinum certified

2015

- "You Know" (with Oliver Heldens) [Spinnin' Records]
- "Collapse 2.0" (featuring Memorecks) [Mad Decent] (Somewhere Else - Remixes)
- "Wit Me Dub" (with Megalodon) [Zeds Dead Inc]
- "Flies" (with LOUDPVCK) [Mad Decent]
- "One Time" (featuring Murs) [Zeds Dead Inc]

2016

- "Back Home" (featuring Freddie Gibbs) [Deadbeats]
- "Frontlines" (with NGHTMRE featuring GG Magree) [Deadbeats] (Northern Lights)
- "Blame" (with Diplo featuring Elliphant) [Deadbeats] (Northern Lights)
- "Stardust" (featuring Twin Shadow) [Deadbeats] (Northern Lights)
- "Too Young" (featuring Rivers Cuomo and Pusha T) [Deadbeats] (Northern Lights)

2017

- "Where the Wild Things Are" (with Illenium) [Deadbeats]
- "Blood Brother" (with Diskord and Reija Lee) [Deadbeats]
- "Way with You" (with Omar LinX) [Jackie Boy]
- "Lights Go Down" (with Jauz) [Bite This and Deadbeats]

2018

- "Samurai" (with Ganja White Night) [Deadbeats and SubCarbon Records]
- "Kill Em" (featuring 1000Volts) [Deadbeats]
- "We Could Be Kings" (with DNMO featuring Tzar) [Deadbeats]
- "Magnets" (with Snails featuring Akylla) [Deadbeats]

2019

- "Lift You Up" (with Delta Heavy) [Deadbeats and RAM Records] (We Are Deadbeats Vol.4)
- "Rescue" (with Dion Timmer featuring Delaney Jane) [Deadbeats] (We Are Deadbeats Vol.4)
- "Stars Tonight" (with DROELOE) [Deadbeats] (We Are Deadbeats Vol.4)
- "Shake" (with Jauz) [Bite This / Deadbeats] (We Are Deadbeats Vol.4)
- "Feel So" (with Funkin Matt featuring Fiora) [Spinnin' Records]
- "Sound of the Underground" (with Urbandawn) [Deadbeats] (We Are Deadbeats Vol.4)
- "Bumpy Teeth" (with Subtronics) [Deadbeats] (We Are Deadbeats Vol.4)

2020

- "Dead of Night" (with Ganja White Night) [Deadbeats] (We Are Deadbeats Vol.4)
- "Into the Abyss" (with Rezz) [Deadbeats] (We Are Deadbeats Vol.4 - Deluxe)
- "POWA" (with PEEKABOO) [Deadbeats]

2021

- "late night drive" [Altered States] (Catching Z's)
- "Alive" (featuring MKLA) [Deadbeats]
- "No Prayers" (with Omar LinX) [Warner Music] (Victor)

2022

- "Gassed Up" (with Subtronics featuring Flowdan) [Deadbeats and Cyclops Music] (FRACTALS)
- "Mr. Blue" (with Omar LinX) [Warner Music] (Victor)
- "Think Of You" (with Blunts & Blondes) [Deadbeats]
- "I Took A Ride" [Deadbeats]
- "In My Head" (featuring MKLA) [Deadbeats]
- "The Machines" (with Blanke) [Deadbeats]
- "Ecstasy Of Soul" (with GRiZ) [Deadbeats]

2023

- "One Three Nine" (featuring Scrufizzer) [Night Bass]
- "Aftertaste" (with HNTR featuring AIDN) [Altered States]
- "Criminal" (with Hamdi featuring Warrior Queen) [Deadbeats]
- "Levitate" (with Funkin Matt featuring Soul Edge) [Altered States]

2024

- "Back Bus" (with REAPER) [Deadbeats]
- "Waves" (with Flux Pavilion and DeathbyRomy) [Deadbeats]
- "Mad Ting" (with Moody Good and Killa P) [Deadbeats]
- "Tomb of the Scorpion" (with Chee) [Deadbeats]
- "Channel Flipping" [Deadbeats]
- "Sweet Memories" [Deadbeats]
- "Heartbeat" (featuring Minke) [Deadbeats]
- "One Of These Mornings" [Deadbeats]

=== Production credits ===
2014

- Omar Linx - "Dosey Doe" (produced by Pro Logic and Zeds Dead) [Jackie Boy]

=== Remixes ===
2009

- Barletta – "Panther" (Zeds Dead Remix)
- Radiohead – "Pyramid Song" (Zeds Dead Illuminati Remix)
- Fenech-Soler – "LA Love" (Zeds Dead Remix)

2010

- Massive Attack – "Paradise Circus" (Zeds Dead Remix)
- Blue Foundation – "Eyes on Fire" (Zeds Dead Remix)
- Sublime - "Doin Time" (Zeds Dead Summer Grime Remix)
- The Rolling Stones – "Gimme Shelter" (Zeds Dead Remix)
- Foo Fighters – "The Pretender" (Zeds Dead Ruckus Remix)
- Dragonette – "Volcano" (Zeds Dead Remix)
- Jeuce – "Kiss" (Zeds Dead Remix)

2011

- Jason Falkner – "Only You" (Zeds Dead Remix)
- DJ Vadim and The Electric – "Toot Toot" (Zeds Dead Remix)
- Blue Foundation – "Heads on Fire" (Zeds Dead Remix)
- Sabi – "Wild Heart" (Zeds Dead Remix)

2012

- Totally Enormous Extinct Dinosaurs – "Household Goods" (Zeds Dead Remix)
- Sebastien Tellier – "Divine" (Danger Remix) (Zeds Dead ReRemix)
- The Roots featuring Monsters of Folk – "Dear God 2.0" (Zeds Dead Remix)
- Colin Munroe featuring Pusha T- "The Fight of My Life" (Zeds Dead Remix)
- Bon Iver – "Woods" (Zeds Dead Remix)
- The Prodigy – "Breathe" (Zeds Dead Remix)

2013

- Marina and the Diamonds – "Lies" (Zeds Dead Remix)
- Nina Simone – "Don't Let Me Be Misunderstood" (Zeds Dead Remix)

2014

- Son Lux – "Flickers" (Zeds Dead Remix)
- Broken Bells – "Holding On For Life" (Zeds Dead Remix)
- DJ Fresh featuring Ella Eyre - "Gravity" (Zeds Dead Remix)
- Jack Ü featuring Kiesza – "Take Ü There" (Zeds Dead Remix)

2015

- Martin Solveig and GTA – "Intoxicated" (Zeds Dead Remix)
- Tazer and Tink – "Wet Dollars" (Zeds Dead Remix)

2016

- Omar Linx – "Red Light Green Light" (Zeds Dead Remix)
- Zeds Dead – "Slow Down" (Zeds Dead Remix)

2018

- 3lau featuring Carly Paige – "Touch" (Zeds Dead Remix)
- Gorgon City with Kamille and Ghosted – "Go Deep" (Zeds Dead Remix)

2019

- Billie Eilish – "Bury a Friend" (Zeds Dead Remix)
- Ellie Goulding and Diplo featuring Swae Lee – "Close to Me" (Zeds Dead Remix)
- Oliver Tree – "Miracle Man" (Zeds Dead Remix)

2020

- Biicla – "Deeper" (Zeds Dead and Funkin Matt Remix)
- Atmosphere – "GodLovesUgly" (Zeds Dead and Subtronics Remix)
- Nessa Barrett – "I Hope Ur Miserable Until Ur Dead" (Zeds Dead Remix)

== Awards ==
=== Much Music Video Awards ===
Year	Nominee / work	Award	Result
2015	Lost You (featuring Twin Shadow and D'Angelo Lacy)	Best EDM/Dance Video	Nominated
2015	Lost You (featuring Twin Shadow and D'Angelo Lacy)	Best Post-Production	Won
2017	"Too Young" (featuring Rivers Cuomo and Pusha T)	Fan Fave Video	Nominated

=== Juno Awards ===
Year	Nominee / work	Award	Result
2015	Lost You featuring Twin Shadow and D'Angelo Lacy	Video Of The Year	Nominated
2015	Zeds Dead	Breakthrough Group Of The Year	Nominated
2017	Northern Lights	Dance Recording of the Year	Nominated

=== Canadian Independent Music Awards ===
Year	Nominee / work	Award	Result
2017	Zeds Dead	Electronic/Dance Artist/Group of the Year	Won
