= Moving On (Marshmello song) =

2017 single by Marshmello

Single by Marshmello
- Released: May 5, 2017
- Genre: Future bass
- Length: 2:59
- Label: Joytime Collective
- Songwriter: Marshmello
- Producer: Marshmello

Marshmello singles chronology
"Twinbow" (2017)	"Moving On" (2017)	"Love U" (2017)

Music video
- "Moving On" on YouTube

"Moving On" is a song performed by American electronic music producer Marshmello on May 5, 2017 via Joytime Collective.

== Background ==
Marshmello shared a teaser for the music video of "Moving On" on social media on May 3, 2017, ahead of the song's premiere. The video shows fictionalized versions of Marshmello, Slushii, Skrillex, & Ookay graduating from high school.

== Track listing ==
Digital download
No.	Title	Length
1.	"Moving On"	2:59

== Charts ==
=== Weekly charts ===
Chart (2017)	Peak position
US Hot Dance/Electronic Songs (Billboard)	18

=== Year-end charts ===
Chart (2017)	Position
US Hot Dance/Electronic Songs (Billboard)	53
Chart (2019)	Position
US Hot Dance/Electronic Songs (Billboard)	85

== Release history ==
Region	Date	Format	Label	Ref.
United States	May 5, 2017	Digital download	Joytime Collective	
