= Keep It Mello =

2016 single by Marshmello featuring Omar LinX

Single by Marshmello featuring Omar LinX

from the album Joytime
- Released: January 8, 2016
- Genre: Trap
- Length: 4:03
- Label: Joytime Collective
- Songwriters: Omar Guzman; Marshmello
- Producer: Marshmello

Marshmello singles chronology
"Keep It Mello" (2016)	"Colour" (2016)

Music video
- "Keep It Mello" on YouTube

"Keep It Mello" is the debut commercial single by American electronic music producer and DJ Marshmello featuring Mexican-Canadian rapper Omar LinX. It was released on January 8, 2016, as the lead single from Marshmello's debut studio album Joytime.

== Composition ==
The song is written in the key of F Minor, with a tempo of 142 beats per minute.

== Music video ==
An accompanying music video was released on April 8, 2016. The video features cameros from Dillon Francis, Mija, Getter, Ookay, and Borgore. According to a description by staffs of Billboard, it features as "traces its cartoonish protagonist and LinX on a journey from the convenience store to a star-studded backyard party." And marks "by marshmallow pong games and toasts".

== Charts ==
=== Weekly charts ===
Weekly chart performance for "Keep It Mello"
Chart (2016)	Peak position
US Hot Dance/Electronic Songs (Billboard)	25

=== Year-end charts ===
Year-end chart performance for "Keep It Mello"
Chart (2016)	Position
US Hot Dance/Electronic Songs (Billboard)	81

== Certifications ==
Certifications for "Keep It Mello"
Region	Certification	Certified units/sales
Canada (Music Canada)	Gold	40,000^{‡}
United States (RIAA)	Gold	500,000^{‡}
^{‡} Sales+streaming figures based on certification alone.
