= Shockwave (album) =

Studio album by Marshmello
- Released: June 11, 2021
- Genre: EDM; future bass; trap; dubstep
- Length: 34:22
- Label: Joytime Collective
- Producer: Carnage; DJ Sliink; Eptic; Marshmello; Nitti Gritti; Peekaboo; Sippy; Subtronics; TroyBoi

Marshmello chronology
Joytime III (2019)	Shockwave (2021)	Mellokillaz (2023)

Singles from Shockwave
- 1. "Back In Time" Released: May 28, 2021; 2. "Hitta" Released: June 8, 2021; 3. "Bad Bitches" Released: June 9, 2021; 4. "House Party" Released: June 10, 2021

Shockwave is the fourth studio album by American DJ and record producer Marshmello, self-released through Marshmello's Joytime Collective label on June 11, 2021. The album was preceded by four singles: "Back In Time", "Hitta", "Bad Bitches", and "House Party". It includes collaborations with various DJs and musicians, including TroyBoi, Nitti Gritti, Megan Thee Stallion, Carnage, Eptic, Juicy J, Subtronics, and Peekaboo.

In the United States, the album debuted at number 3 on the Billboard Dance/Electronic Albums chart and at number 44 on the Independent Albums chart. At the 64th Annual Grammy Awards, Shockwave was nominated for Best Dance/Electronic Album.

== Track listing ==
Shockwave track listing
No.	Title	Writer(s)	Producer(s)	Length
1.	"Fairytale"	Marshmello	Marshmello	2:36
2.	"Supernovacane"	Marshmello; Kameron Alexander	Marshmello	3:00
3.	"Jiggle It" (with TroyBoi)	Marshmello; Troy Henry	Marshmello; TroyBoi	2:51
4.	"Back It Up" (with DJ Sliink)	Marshmello; Ms. Porsch; Stacey White	Marshmello; DJ Sliink	2:40
5.	"VIBR8"	Marshmello	Marshmello	3:00
6.	"Bad Bitches" (with Nitti Gritti featuring Megan Thee Stallion)	Marshmello; Richard Mears IV; Megan Pete	Marshmello; Nitti Gritti	2:32
7.	"Back In Time" (with Carnage)	Marshmello; Diamanté Blackmon; Marcel Kosic	Marshmello; Carnage	2:41
8.	"Hitta" (with Eptic featuring Juicy J)	Marshmello; Paul Beauregard; Michaël Bella; Darnell Carlton; Cedric Coleman; Ricky Dunigan; Jordan Houston III; Patrick Lanshaw	Marshmello; Eptic	2:51
9.	"House Party" (with Subtronics)	Marshmello; Jesse Kardon	Marshmello; Subtronics	3:25
10.	"Candy Kid" (with Sippy)	Marshmello; Laura Patterson	Marshmello; Sippy	2:10
11.	"Pushin Stacks" (with Peekaboo)	Marshmello; Matthew Lucas	Marshmello; Peekaboo	3:35
12.	"Shockwave"	Marshmello	Marshmello	3:01
Total length:				34:22

== Personnel ==
- Emerson Mancini (Note: Mancini, who publicly came out as a trans man in January 2023, is credited by his deadname.) – mastering
- Tom Norris – mixing

== Charts ==
Chart (2021)	Peak position
US Top Dance Albums (Billboard)	3
US Independent Albums (Billboard)	44
