= Sugar Papi =

Studio album by Marshmello
- Released: November 3, 2023
- Length: 30:10
- Language: Spanish; Portuguese; English
- Label: Sony Latin; Joytime Collective
- Producer: Miguel Armenta; Edgar Barrera; Caleb Calloway; Nico Cotton; DJ Trone; Earwulf; Eydren; FnZ; J Cross; K Lo K; Lennex; Lil Mexico; Marshmello; Mauro; Jorge Milliano; Munk; OG Parker; Jesús Ortiz Paz; ØMG; SharoTowers; Slow Mike; Angel Tumbado

Marshmello chronology
Mellokillaz (2023)	Sugar Papi (2023)	Mellodeath Tapes Vol. I (2024)

Singles from Sugar Papi
- 1. "El Merengue" Released: March 3, 2023; 2. "Esta Vida" Released: April 13, 2023; 3. "Como Yo :(" Released: June 22, 2023; 4. "Tempo" Released: August 17, 2023; 5. "Alcohol" Released: November 1, 2023

Professional ratings
Review scores
Source	Rating
AllMusic	4/5 stars

Sugar Papi is the fifth studio album by American DJ and record producer Marshmello. It was released on November 3, 2023, by Sony Music Latin and Joytime Collective. The album features artists including Young Miko, Manuel Turizo, Tiago PZK, Anuel AA, Farruko, Polimá Westcoast, Nicky Jam, ChocQuibTown, Luísa Sonza, and Fuerza Regida. Marshmello produced all tracks on the album with other producers FnZ, Edgar Barrera, Eydren, and OG Parker, among others, also contributing production.

== Background ==
Marshmello announced the release date for his debut Latin music album Sugar Papi on October 6, 2023, with features such as Young Miko, Manuel Turizo, Tiago PZK, Farruko, among others expected to be on the album. Marshmello told Billboard that he had wanted to make the album but was not sure when the right time was. Sony Latin reached out to the producer and asked if he wanted to make a Latin album, which inspired Marshmello to begin working on it.

== Commercial performance ==
Suga Papi debuted at number 97 on the US Billboard 200, including atop the Top Dance/Electronic Albums and number 9 on the Top Latin Albums charts selling 11,000 album-equivalent units.

== Track listing ==
Sugar Papi track listing
No.	Title	Writer(s)	Producer(s)	Length
1.	"Tempo" (with Young Miko)	Marshmello; Isaac De Boni; Lil Mexico Beatz; Diego Lopez Crespo; Héctor López; Michael Mule; María Ramírez	Marshmello; Caleb Calloway; FnZ; Lil Mexico Beatz; Mauro	1:47
2.	"Tusi" (with Lil Cake and Brray)	Marshmello; Kamil Jacob Assad; Valentino Laborde; Lennex; Bryan Quiñones; Juan Romero; Hayden Tree	Marshmello; Lennex; Munk; Manny Marroquin^{[a]}	2:39
3.	"El Merengue" (with Manuel Turizo)	Marshmello; Edgar Barrera; Carolina Colón Juarbe; Nicolas Cotton; Miguel Martinez Perea; Juan Medina Vélez; Julián Turizo Zapata; Manuel Turizo Zapata	Marshmello; Barrera; Nico Cotton; Slow Mike	3:09
4.	"Como Yo :(" (with Tiago PZK)	Marshmello; Adrián Augusto Sánchez; Barrera; Tiago Pacheco Lezcano; Elena Rose	Marshmello; Barrera; Eydren	2:21
5.	"Alcohol" (with Anuel AA)	Marshmello; Emmanuel Santiago	Marshmello; Eydren; ØMG	2:51
6.	"Esta Vida" (with Farruko)	Marshmello; Jerónimo Hernández de la Cruz; Franklin Martinez; Luis A. Oneill; Marcos Pérez; Carlos Reyes Rosado; Nestor Santana Castillo	Marshmello; J Cross; K Lo K; SharoTowers	3:29
7.	"Super High" (with Polimá Westcoast)	Marshmello; Omar Alejandro García; Augusto Sánchez; Walo Eduardo Borges; Omar Fernando Garcia; Polimá Miguel Orellana; Jorge Milliano; Daniel Tenorio	Marshmello; Eydren; Milliano; ØMG	2:29
8.	"Say Woah!" (with Nicky Jam)	Marshmello; Samantha Cámara; Juan Diego Medina; Pablo Feliú; Milliano; Nick Rivera Caminero	Marshmello; Milliano	2:17
9.	"Dónde Están Que No Los Veo" (with ChocQuibTown)	Marshmello; DJ Trone; Gloria Martínez Perea; Miguel Martínez Perez; Prieto; Tree; Carlos Valencia	Marshmello; DJ Trone; Munk; Slow Mike	3:33
10.	"Sou Musa do Verão" (with Luísa Sonza)	Marshmello; Carolzinha; Earwulf; Douglas Moda; Njomza; OG Parker; Luísa Sonza; Tree	Marshmello; Earwulf; Munk; Parker	3:07
11.	"Harley Quinn" (with Fuerza Regida)	Marshmello; Miguel Armenta; Jonathan Caro; Daniel Gutierrez; Jesús Ortiz Paz; Jesus Rodriguez Jr.; Osbaldo Sánchez	Marshmello; Armenta; Munk; Ortiz Paz; Angel Tumbado	2:23
Total length:				30:10

Notes

- ^{^[a]} signifies an additional producer.

== Personnel ==
- Zach Pereyra – mastering (tracks 1, 2, 5, 7–9), engineering assistance (2, 9)
- Luis Barrera Jr. – mastering, mixing (track 3)
- Emerson Mancini – mastering (tracks 4, 6, 10)
- Erick Urbina Toranzo – mastering (track 11)
- Manny Marroquin – mixing (tracks 1, 2, 4–10)
- Kevin Madigan – mixing (tracks 2, 9)
- Daniel Lebrija – mixing (track 11)
- Oliver García Cerón – mixing (track 11)
- Camilo Zea – engineering, recording (tracks 1–10)
- Felipe Bernal – engineering, recording (tracks 1–10)
- Felipe Trujillo – engineering, recording (tracks 1–10)
- Fernando Pedreira – recording (track 2)
- Lil Cake – recording (track 2)
- Santiago Ruiz – recording (track 4)
- Andres Collazo – recording (track 5)
- Luian Malave – recording (track 5)
- Carl Benoit – recording (track 6)
- Marcos G. Pérez – recording (track 6)
- Nestor Santana Castillo – recording (track 6)
- Jorge Milliano – recording (track 8)
- Luciano Scalercio – recording (track 10)
- Toptear – recording (track 11)
- Ramses Ascanio – engineering assistance (tracks 1–10)
- Anthony Vilchis – engineering assistance (tracks 2, 9)
- Trey Station – engineering assistance (tracks 2, 9)
- Alejandro Ramirez – engineering assistance (track 3)
- Michael Woods – bass, guitar (track 8)

== Charts ==
Chart performance for Sugar Papi
Chart (2023–2024)	Peak position
Portuguese Albums (AFP)	133
Spanish Albums (PROMUSICAE)	48
US Billboard 200	97
US Top Dance Albums (Billboard)	1
US Top Latin Albums (Billboard)	9

== Certifications ==
Certifications for "Sugar Papi"
Region	Certification	Certified units/sales
Brazil (Pro-Música Brasil)	Gold	20,000^{‡}
^{‡} Sales+streaming figures based on certification alone.

== Release history ==
Release history for Sugar Papi
Region	Release date	Format	Label	Ref.
Various	November 3, 2023	Digital download; streaming	Sony Latin; Joytime Collective	
