= Joytime II =

Studio album by Marshmello
- Released: June 22, 2018
- Genre: Future bass; trap
- Length: 31:23
- Label: Joytime Collective
- Producer: Marshmello

Marshmello chronology
Joytime (2016)	Joytime II (2018)	Roll the Dice (2019)

Singles from Joytime II
- 1. "Tell Me" Released: June 8, 2018; 2. "Check This Out" Released: June 15, 2018

Joytime II is the second studio album by American DJ and record producer Marshmello. It was released on June 22, 2018.

== Background ==
Billboard said Marshmello "promised" the album to be musically similar to its predecessor, Joytime. During his performance at the 2018 Electric Daisy Carnival festival, Marshmello played material from the album, which he later uploaded in video to his Twitter page. On Instagram, he revealed the album cover, captioning "For all my day one mellogang...Joytime II the album is coming soon."

== Singles ==
The first single from the album is "Tell Me", which Marshmello promised to release on June 8, 2018, if his social media post about the song received 5,000 comments. The post stated "I will drop Tell Me, one of the singles from Joytime II, this Friday if this post gets 5,000 comments about one good thing you did this week." "Check This Out" was released on June 15, 2018 as the second single of the album.

== Critical reception ==
Professional ratings
Review scores
Source	Rating
Pitchfork	4.2/10
Rolling Stone	1.5/5 stars

Rolling Stone described the album as monotonous and Marshmello's decision to not feature guests as disappointing, stating "every song sounds like it has already been pre-leased for use by energy-drink companies or extreme-sports squads." The album was given a 'one-and-a-half star' rating by the magazine.

Tommy Monroe of Chorus.fm reviewed the album as "a filled, fun electronic club sounds that later become boring due to its monotony. He praised tracks "Flashbacks", "Tell Me" and "Together" for their feature but criticized "Paralyzed", and "Rooftops" for the lack of rhythm.

== Track listing ==
Adapted from iTunes.

Joytime II
No.	Title	Length
1.	"Stars"	4:06
2.	"Together"	4:06
3.	"Rooftops"	2:57
4.	"Check This Out"	3:39
5.	"Flashbacks"	2:45
6.	"Tell Me"	2:38
7.	"Paralyzed"	3:39
8.	"Power"	3:42
9.	"Imagine"	3:51

== Charts ==
Chart (2018)	Peak position
US Billboard 200	165
US Heatseekers Albums (Billboard)	6
US Independent Albums (Billboard)	21
US Top Dance Albums (Billboard)	1
