= Marshmello =

American DJ (born 1992)

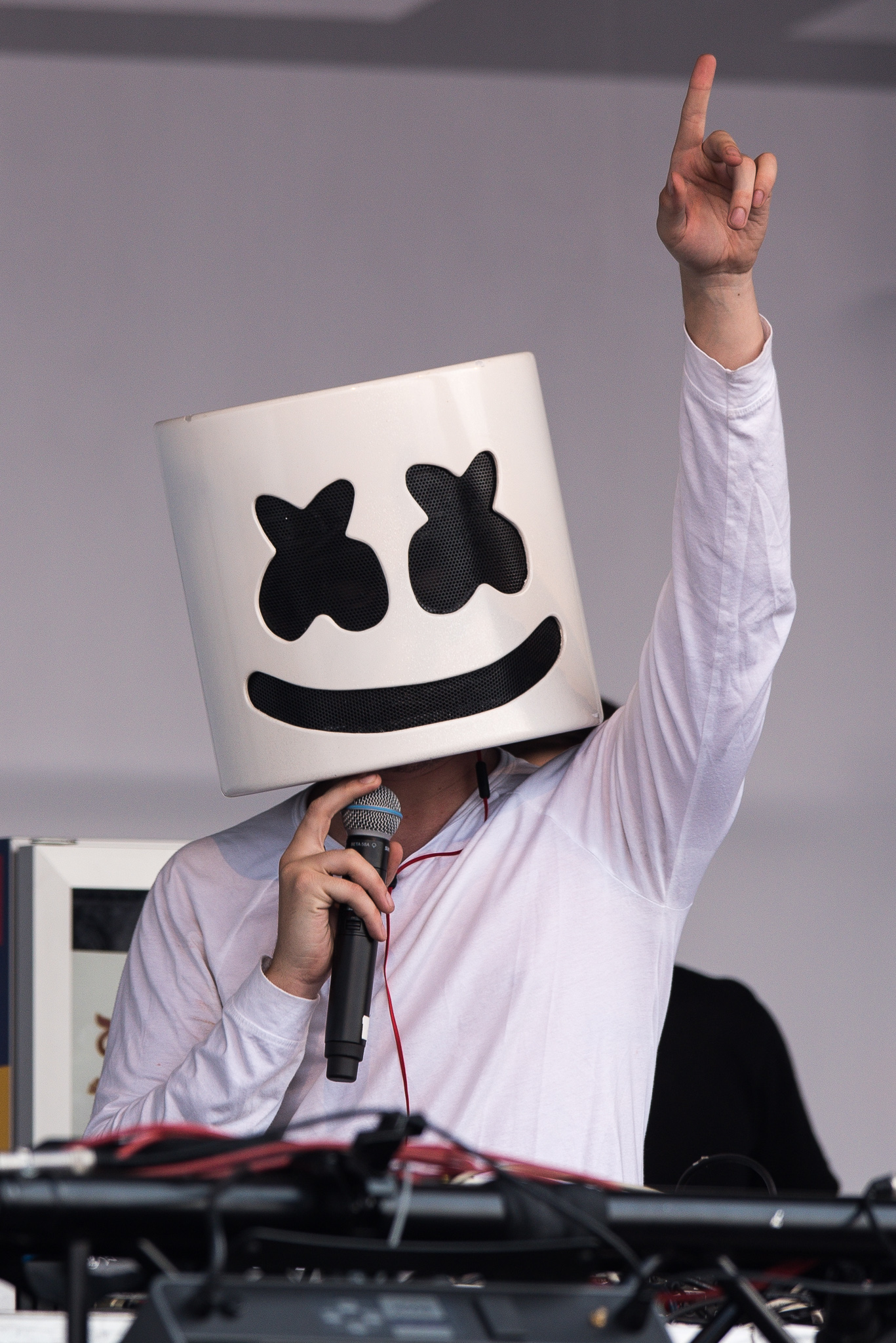
- Marshmello performing at Open Beatz 2016

Background information
- Also known as: Dotcom
- Born: Christopher Comstock; May 19, 1992 (age 34); Philadelphia, Pennsylvania, U.S.
- Genres: Dubstep; electronic; future bass; hardstyle; hip-hop; Jersey club; trap; festival trap; pop-punk
- Occupations: Disc jockey; record producer
- Works: Discography
- Years active: 2010–present
- Labels: Joytime Collective; Astralwerks; Buygore; Monstercat; Owsla; Geffen; Casablanca; Republic; Columbia
- Member of: The Binches; Underbrook
- Website: marshmellomusic.com

YouTube information
- Years active: 2015–present
- Genres: Music; gaming; cooking
- Subscribers: 58.6 million
- Views: 18 billion
- Last updated: August 14, 2026

Christopher Comstock (born May 19, 1992), known professionally as Marshmello and formerly as Dotcom, is an American DJ and record producer. His songs "Silence" (featuring Khalid), "Wolves" (with Selena Gomez), "Friends" (with Anne-Marie), "Happier" (with Bastille), and "Alone" have each received multi-platinum certifications in several countries, and peaked within the top 40 of the Billboard Hot 100. (Note: Adapted from Marshmello discography.) His musical style includes groove-oriented, synth and bass-heavy electronic dance music.

Comstock first gained a following on SoundCloud as Dotcom in 2010 initially posting mashups, remixes, and singles and gained a following in his first few years. He gained recognition as Marshmello in early 2015 from publishing remixes online. His debut studio album, Joytime (2016), included his debut commercial single, "Keep It Mello". Released in May of that year by indie label Monstercat, his single "Alone", peaked at number 28 on the US Billboard Hot 100 and received quintuple platinum certification by the Recording Industry Association of America (RIAA). In 2017, after releasing the singles "Chasing Colors", "Twinbow" and "Moving On", Comstock collaborated with R&B singer Khalid to release the single "Silence", which received platinum or multi-platinum certifications in eight countries. Later that year, he saw similar success with his collaborative single with singer Selena Gomez, "Wolves".

In 2018, he released "Friends", a collaboration with British singer Anne-Marie. Months later, his second studio album, Joytime II (2018), was supported by the singles "Tell Me" and "Check This Out". "Happier", a collaboration with British band Bastille, was released that August and became his highest-charting song on the Billboard Hot 100, peaking at number two. In 2019, he earned US$40 million, ranking second on the list of highest paid DJs compiled by Forbes. In 2020, he and American rapper Juice Wrld released "Come & Go", from the latter's posthumous album Legends Never Die, matched "Happier" as his highest-charting song on the Billboard Hot 100. In 2021, his fourth album, Shockwave earned him a Grammy nomination.

Comstock wears a custom white helmet, resembling a marshmallow, for public appearances and in his music videos. His identity was initially unknown to the general public, but was confirmed to be Comstock by Forbes in April 2017. Aside from his work as Marshmello, Comstock founded the pop-punk band Underbrook, for whom he is lead vocalist.

== Career ==
=== 2010–2015: Early beginnings on SoundCloud as Dotcom ===
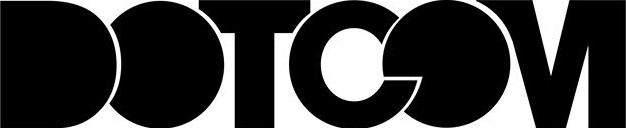
Dotcom's first logo

Comstock started his music career in 2010 as Dotcom, when he created his SoundCloud account. For the first three years, he garnered a following by initially posting mashups as well as producing and self-releasing dubstep remixes and singles. Comstock then transitioned into producing trap with his most notable work being his remix of "Hate Bein' Sober" by Chief Keef reaching over 4 million plays on SoundCloud by July 2014. That same month and year, Comstock signed with Borgore's Los Angeles-based label, Buygore Records.

Comstock was also notable for producing "festival trap", a subgenre of trap combining sounds from Hardstyle and Big room house. His most notable festival trap tracks included "Michael Myers" and "Take A Picture", a collaboration with Kayzo.

=== 2015–2016: As Marshmello and Joytime ===
Comstock posted his first original song as Marshmello, "Wavez", to his SoundCloud page in the early months of 2015. (Note: Adapted from Marshmello on SoundCloud) In June 2015, he released remixes of songs by American DJ duo Jack Ü and Russian-German DJ Zedd. As he released more songs, he began to receive support from musicians such as Skrillex, who reposted his song "Find Me" on SoundCloud. In late 2015, he made performances at New York's Pier 94, Pomona, California's HARD Day of the Dead festival, and in March 2016, he performed at Miami Music Week.

On January 8, 2016, via his label Joytime Collective, Comstock released his debut studio album Joytime, consisting of 10 songs. One single was released from the album, titled "Keep It Mello", featuring Mexican rapper Omar Linx, and was certified gold by the Recording Industry Association of America (RIAA). (Note: Adapted from Marshmello on iTunes.) The album peaked at number five on Billboard's Dance/Electronic Songs chart, number fourteen on the US Heatseeker Albums chart and forty-one on the Independent Albums chart.

Comstock debuted on Monstercat, a Canadian independent record label, with the release of "Alone", which appeared on the label's compilation album Monstercat 027 – Cataclysm. (Note: Adapted from Marshmello's channel on YouTube.) The song became his first to debut on the Billboard Hot 100, peaking at 60th and charting on the Dance/Electronic Songs chart at ninth and the Canadian Hot 100 at 56th, which was also his first in Canada. It was also certified platinum in both Canada by Music Canada and the United States by RIAA.

=== 2016–2018: "Silence", "Wolves", "Friends", and Joytime II ===
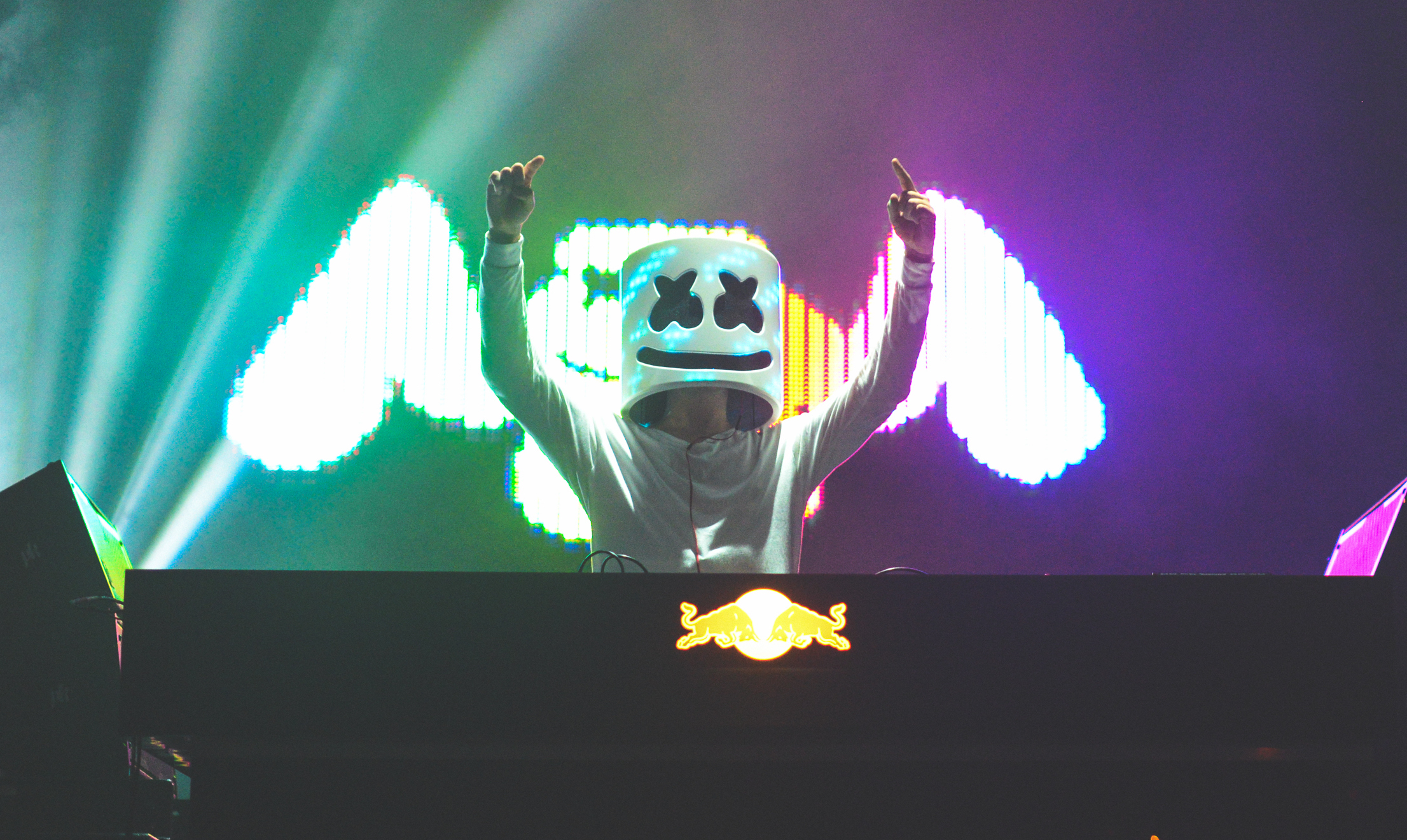
Marshmello performing at VELD 2016

By May 2016, although his identity was unknown, Marshmello was frequently suggested to be Comstock. On June 19, 2016, Comstock performed at Electric Daisy Carnival in Las Vegas. In a gimmick attempted by Comstock and Dutch DJ Tiësto, the latter wore the same clothes as the former on stage and took off his helmet presenting himself as Marshmello. It was later regarded as a publicity stunt by fans and the media due to their conflicting tour dates and a photo of "the two helmeted DJs hanging out together pre-show".

Comstock announced the Ritual Tour on Twitter, in which he performed in several countries including the United States, China, South Korea, India and Paraguay from late September until early January of the following year. The tour was accompanied with his debut on dubstep musician Skrillex's Owsla label, with a single titled "Ritual", in which vocalist Wrabel was featured. An official music video for the song was published to YouTube. Soon after, Comstock launched his own record label named Joytime Collective and recruited fellow DJ and producer Slushii as the first signee on its roster.

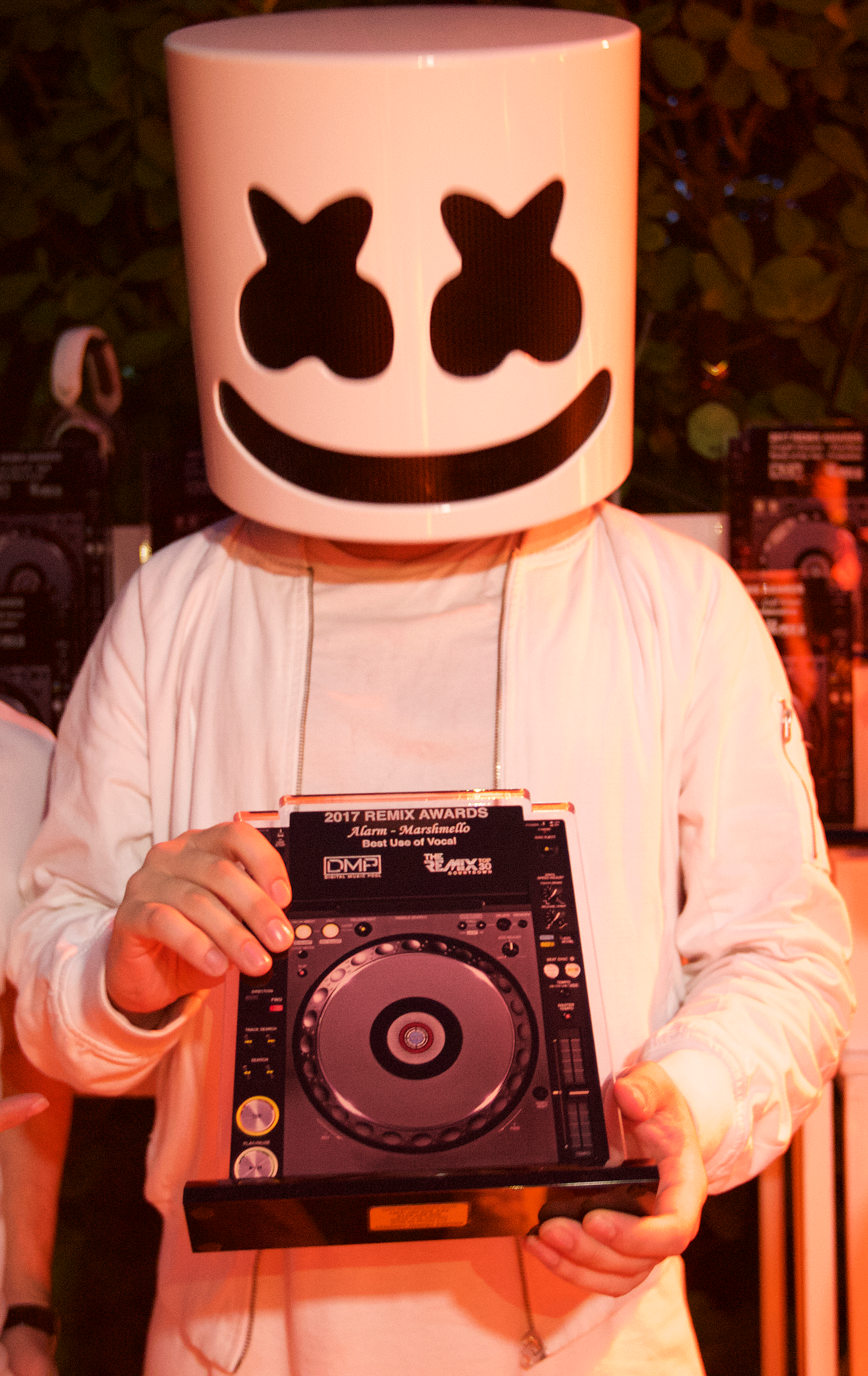
Marshmello receiving an award in 2017 from producers Sean Hamilton and Eric Hertzog at the Remix Awards in Miami, Florida

Comstock collaborated with Ookay to release the single "Chasing Colors", featuring vocals by American singer Noah Cyrus. He later collaborated with Slushii to release the single "Twinbow", a song previously only known to the public as a snippet. During the mid-year, his third single of the year titled "Moving On" was released, having debuted two years before receiving the official release. A music video for the song was also published, having received 302 million views as of March 2026. Months later, Comstock announced upcoming collaborations with American hip hop recording artist Blackbear and Demi Lovato. The collaborations, however, were never released officially as of December 2018. Following that, Comstock released "Love U" as a single for free as appreciation to his fans. The song was described by Billboard as a "gritty dance-pop single with a pounding bass line and helium-breathed vocals."

His next single, announced on Twitter, was a collaboration with American R&B singer Khalid titled "Silence", which was released on August 11, 2017, via RCA Records. The song appeared on the Top 200 in over 28 countries. It topped the Dance charts in Australia, the United Kingdom, and the United States, and charted in the Top 10 of more than fifteen countries such as Germany, Sweden and Norway. It also appeared on the year-end charts of Hungary, Denmark, Austria, Belgium, and the Netherlands. Additionally, it was certified multi-platinum in many countries. Among them were platinum by BPI (United Kingdom) and BM (Germany), double platinum by BEA (Belgium), RMNZ (New Zealand) and RIAA (United States), triple platinum by MC (Canada), a quadruple platinum by SRIA (Sweden) and a quintuple platinum by ARIA (Australia).

Later in the year, he released his collaboration with American singer Selena Gomez, the single "Wolves" which became a commercial success, having reached the top 10 in more than 20 countries. It topped the charts in Latvia, Poland and Hungary, and the Billboard Dance/Electronic Songs chart. It was also his highest-charting Billboard Hot 100 song in 2017, having peaked in the Top 50 of over 50 countries and sold over 2.5 million copies of certified units. The song was certified gold in the United Kingdom, Germany, Portugal and Denmark, and multiple-platinum in Brazil, Sweden, Canada, and Australia while receiving single-platinum certification in the United States, France, Italy, Spain, Belgium and New Zealand.

Succeeding "Wolves", the single "You & Me" was released through Joytime Collective, accompanied by an animated music video which was produced and directed by Toon53. The video was published three weeks after the song's release on his YouTube channel, receiving over 131 million views as of March 2026.

In November, Forbes published an article confirming Comstock to be Marshmello, with regards to existing proofs such as his real name being revealed in music royalty manager BMI's database and that Marshmello's company was registered in August 2015 under Comstock in Delaware. Furthermore, it was also disclosed to Forbes by industry insiders that the two are the same person. Previously known pieces of evidence such as the ASCAP credit, their physical and musical similarities, and Skrillex addressing Marshmello as "Chris" were taken into account of confirming Marshmello's identity.

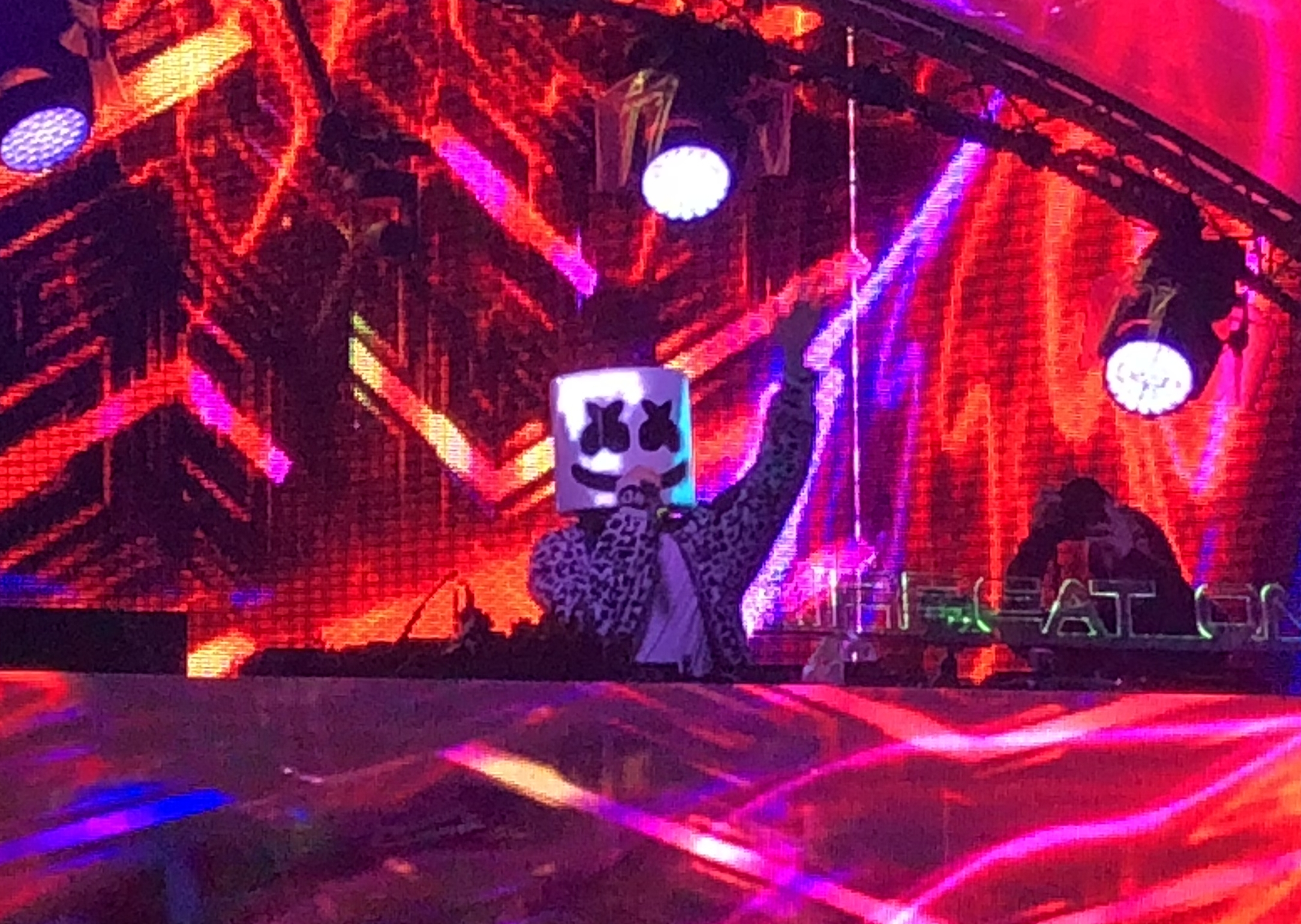
Marshmello performing at Airbeat One 2018

In January 2018, Comstock released a posthumous collaboration with rapper Lil Peep, titled "Spotlight". He decided to release the single only after speaking to Peep's mother, who had requested her son's unpublished musical work to be released as much as possible. A month later, Comstock worked with frequent collaborator Slushii for the song "There ×2", which was released as a single.

He released a collaboration with British singer Anne-Marie named "Friends", as the fifth single from Anne-Marie's debut studio album, Speak Your Mind. The song became his highest-charting song on the Hot 100 until October 2018, peaking at number eleven. It also received a single-platinum certification in Belgium, Germany, New Zealand, the United Kingdom, and the United States alongside receiving an Australian double-platinum and a Canadian triple-platinum certification.

Among other singles released after his work with Anne-Marie were a song with rapper Logic titled "Everyday", which was released as the third single from his seventh mixtape, Bobby Tarantino II, "Fly" and "You Can Cry", a collaborative single with rapper Juicy J and British soul singer James Arthur. On June 19, Comstock announced on Twitter his second studio album titled Joytime II, which would be musically similar to its predecessor. The album was released on June 22, 2018. Rolling Stone described it as monotonous and Comstock's decision to not feature guests as disappointing, stating "every song sounds like it has already been pre-leased for use by energy-drink companies or extreme-sports squads." The album was given a 'one-and-a-half star' rating by the magazine, while Pitchfork gave the album a 4.2 out of 10 rating. Two singles were released from the album in June, titled "Tell Me" and "Check This Out", the latter of which receiving an official music video published several months later.

=== 2018–2023: "Happier", Joytime III and Shockwave ===
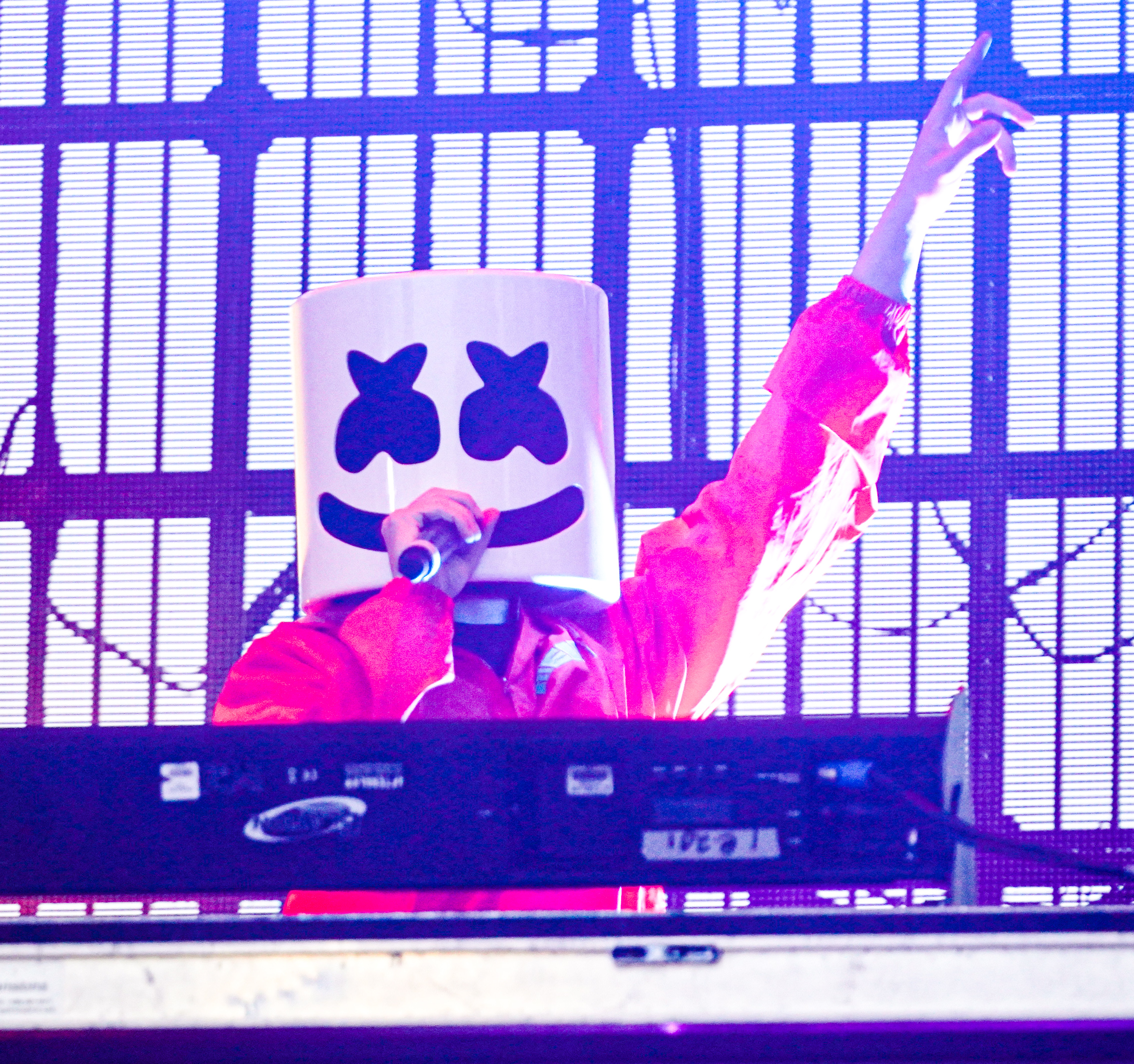
Marshmello performing live in June 2019 at Capital Pride Festival And Concert In Washington, D.C.

In August 2018, Comstock collaborated with British band Bastille to release a single titled "Happier" in August. It became his highest-charting song in Canada, Sweden, the United Kingdom, and the United States, while becoming his third number-one song on the Dance/Electronic Songs chart, where it spent a record 69 weeks at the top. The song was certified gold in Belgium, Sweden, and the United Kingdom, platinum in New Zealand and the United States, and double-platinum in Australia and Canada. His subsequent singles, collaborations with Egyptian singer-songwriter Amr Diab titled "Bayen Habeit" and American rapper and producer Roddy Ricch titled "Project Dreams", were released in December.

In January 2019, Comstock collaborated with the free-to-play massively multiplayer online game Fortnite Battle Royale to hold an in-game virtual concert, along with releasing merchandise based on the game. On February 2 and 3, the concert was held online, amassing over 10 million players on the first day. During the first quarter of 2019 he released various collaboration. The first, in February, was a collaboration with dubstep producer Svdden Death titled "Sell Out". The second was with Scottish band Chvrches, called "Here with Me". Finally, in April, he released Roll the Dice, an extended play with California rappers SOB X RBE. It contains three songs: "Roll the Dice", "Don't Save Me" and "First Place".

In June 2019, he released "Rescue Me", a collaboration with American rock band A Day to Remember as the first single from his third album, Joytime III. On November 13, Comstock collaborated with Blackbear and Yungblud to release "Tongue Tied".

On May 1, 2020, Comstock then collaborated with Halsey to release "Be Kind". In July 2020, Comstock appeared on rapper Juice WRLD's posthumous album Legends Never Die, on the tracks "Come & Go" and "Hate the Other Side", which reached numbers two and ten on the Billboard Hot 100, respectively, with the former matching "Happier" as his highest-charting song.

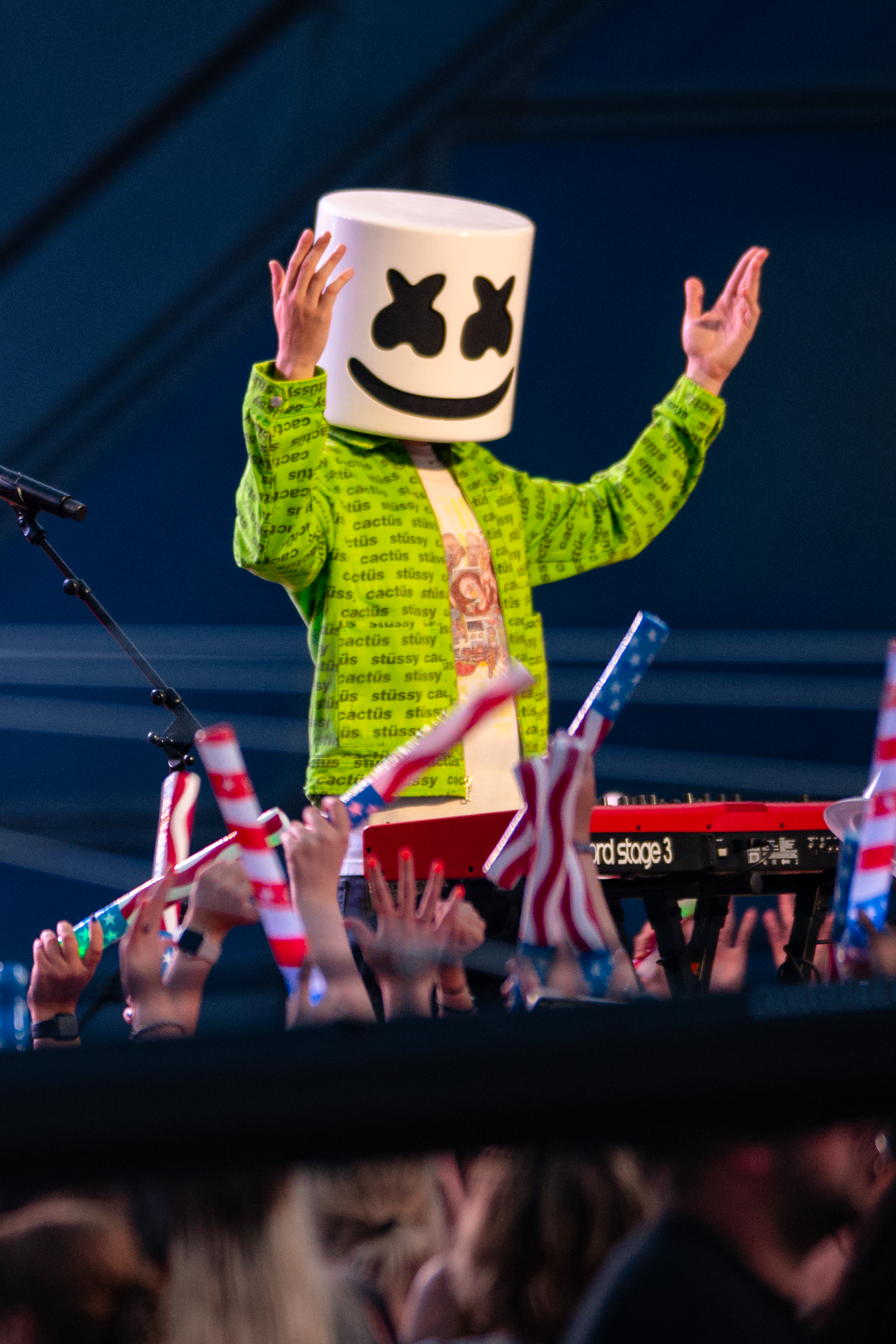
Marshmello performing live with the Jonas Brothers in June 2021 at 4th of July Show Taping in Cleveland

In May 2021, Comstock headlined the opening ceremony of the 2021 UEFA Champions League Final.

On June 11, 2021, Comstock released his fourth studio album, Shockwave. It was independently released by the producer's own Joytime Collective label. On November 23, 2021, the album was announced as a nominee for the Grammy Award for Best Dance/Electronic Album, earning Comstock his first Grammy nomination.

In 2022, Comstock collaborated with Coca-Cola to create a limited edition flavour under their Coca-Cola Creations brand; the strawberry and watermelon-flavoured drink was packaged in cans paying homage to "Marshmello's signature aesthetic."

=== 2023–present: Sugar Papi, Underbrook, and upcoming projects ===
On November 3, 2023, Comstock released his fifth album and debut Latin album Sugar Papi, featuring the singles "Tempo", "Esta Vida", "El Merengue", "Como Yo :(", and "Alcohol".

On January 7, 2025, Comstock announced the launch of a band named Underbrook, with whom he performs under his real name. Underbrook is a pop-punk band with Comstock as its lead vocalist.

On January 17, 2025 Republic Records released the single "Slow Motion", the second collaboration between Comstock and the Jonas Brothers. Subsequently, it was announced in March that Comstock would be joining the Jonas Brothers as a support act for 10 shows of their upcoming JONAS20 - Living the Dream tour.

On August 8, 2025, Comstock released the single "Holy Water" featuring Jelly Roll.

== Artistry ==
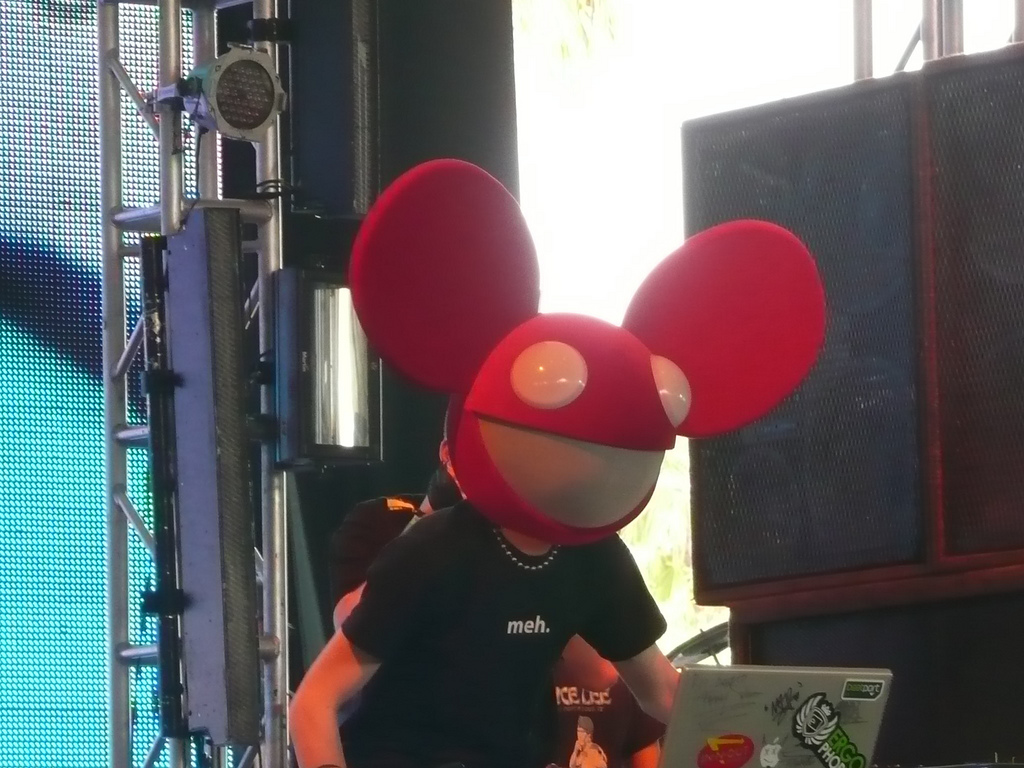
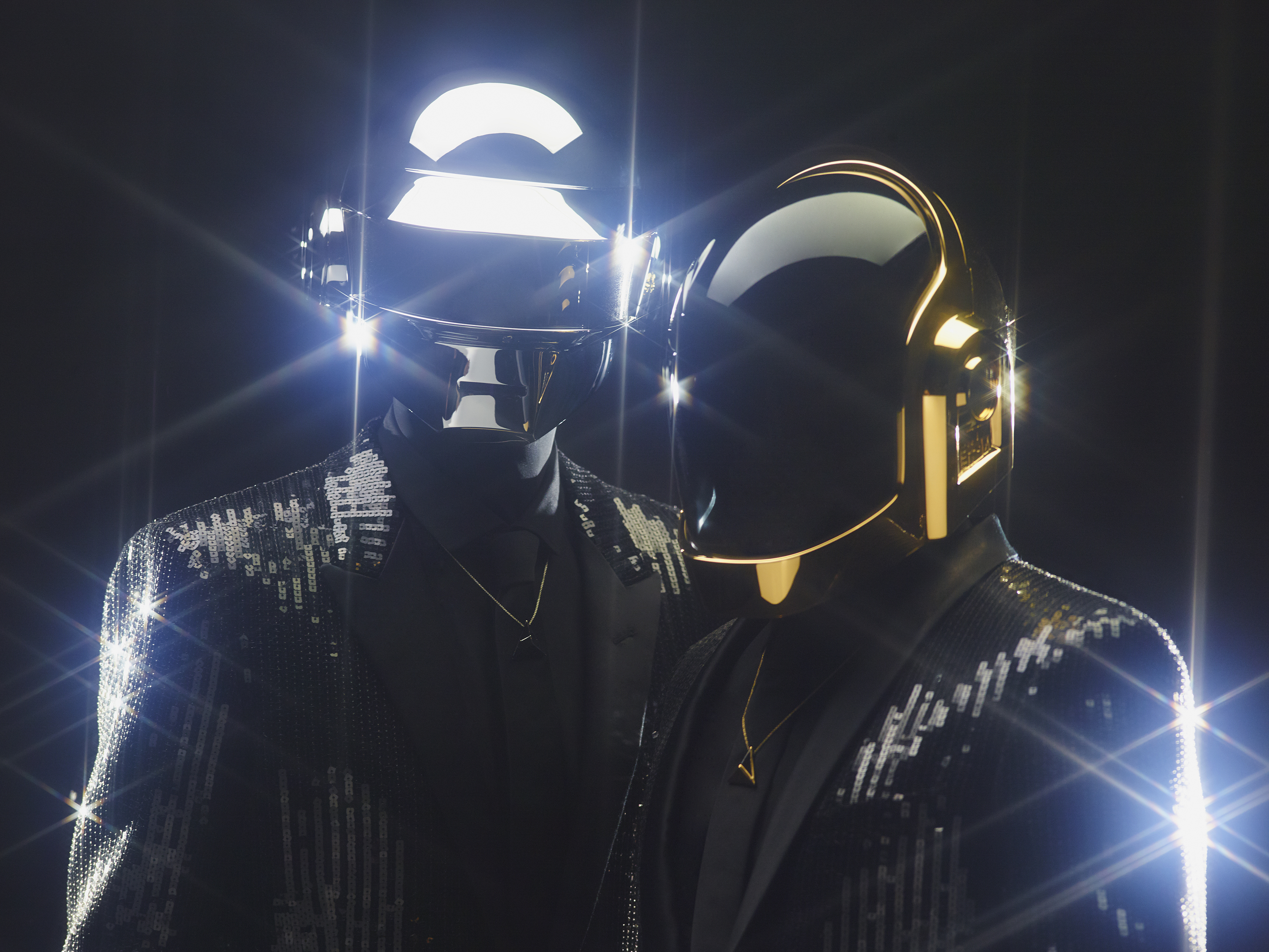
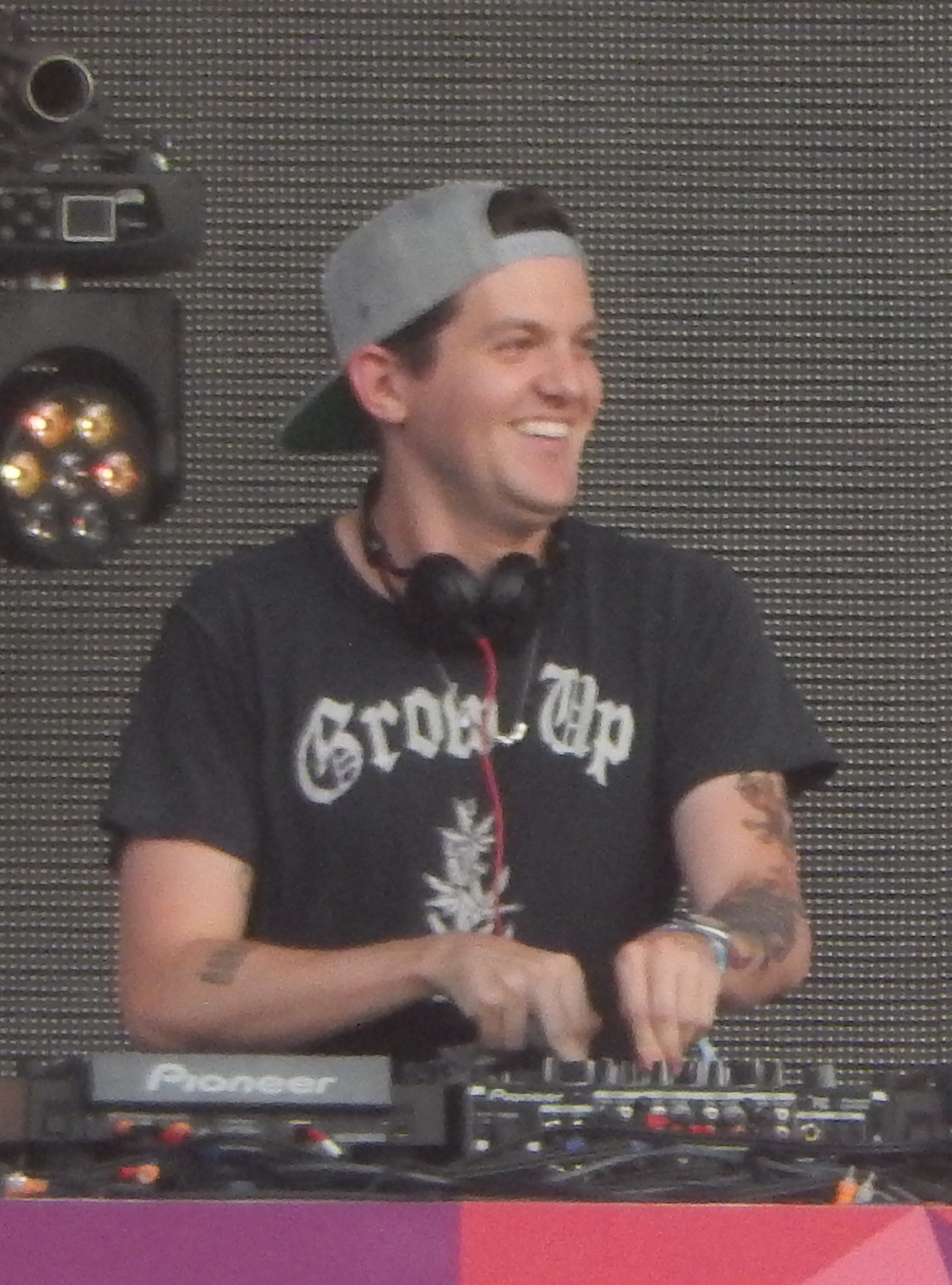
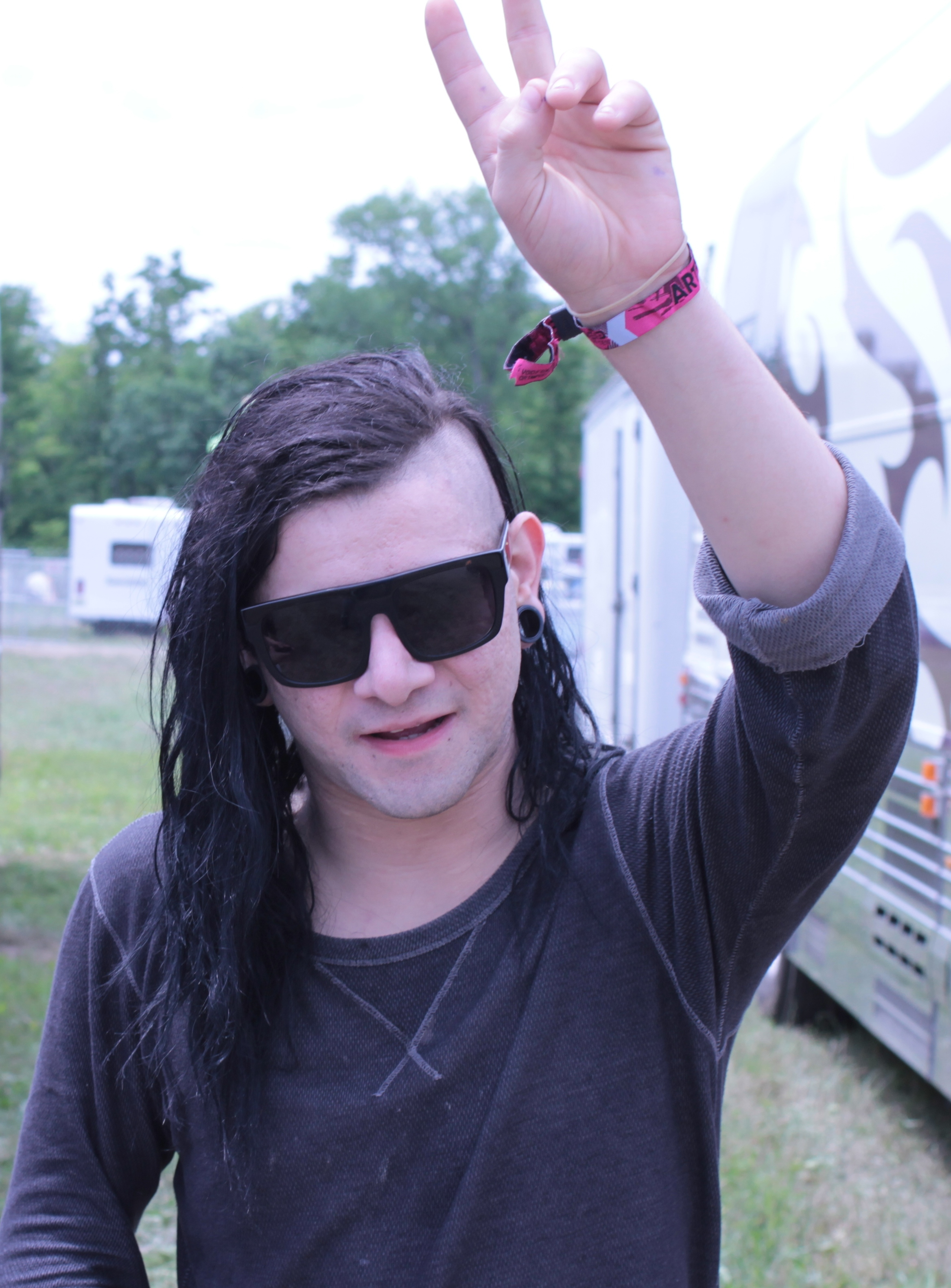
Deadmau5 (upper left) and Daft Punk (upper right) inspired Marshmello's appearance and style, and Dillon Francis (lower left) and Skrillex (lower right) inspired his musical career

Comstock cites Dillon Francis and Skrillex as his two biggest influences in his music career. Dotcom is a derivative of his last name "Comstock" and Comstock chose it, as his first stage name, because "kids in school and throughout [his] life would [jokingly call him] Chris Dotcomstock or Chris Dotcom".

Marshmello wears a custom white helmet, resembling a marshmallow, for public appearances and in his music videos. His identity was initially unknown, but was confirmed by Forbes to be Comstock in April 2017 using royalty databases. Fans also noted events such as Skrillex's referring of Marshmello as "Chris" in an interview, the managerial connection of Shalizi, and the similar tattoos and birthday. On July 2, 2019, Marshmello released a documentary with More Than Music (Artist Spotlight Series) on YouTube. In the documentary, Shalizi describes the process and effort into creating the Marshmello brand.

His stage name, an alternative spelling of "marshmallow", and his marshmallow mascot head were both inspired by Canadian electronic music producer Deadmau5, who also uses an alternate spelling for his stage name and performs wearing a "dead mouse" mascot head. Acknowledgement of Deadmau5's contribution to Marshmello's persona is evident in the music video for "Alone".

As a YouTuber, Marshmello has published gaming and cooking videos for his series "Gaming with Marshmello" and "Cooking with Marshmello". In an episode of the latter, American singer Paula Abdul was featured as a guest. In the cooking series, Marshmello was shown presenting his methods of cooking, for foods such as meals, snacks and desserts. Appearing as a non-speaker, he would use body language to express himself in the videos.

== Philanthropy ==
Marshmello, together with Fortnite player Tyler "Ninja" Blevins, have won prize money of $1 million from Epic Games's E3 Celebrity Pro Am charity tournament, half of which was donated to KIND (Kids in Need of Defense), an organization providing legal counsel to refugees and immigrant children. With the single "Happier" and its pet-dog-themed video, he supported the #FindYourFido campaign by American Society for the Prevention of Cruelty to Animals (ASPCA) in October 2018, also recognized as "Adopt a Shelter Dog" month.

According to accounting documents viewed by Business Insider, Comstock, among several other musicians, was found to have allegedly misused funds from the Shuttered Venue Operators Grant (SVOG), a COVID-19 relief fund "for struggling independent venues and arts groups during the pandemic." Comstock received a $9.9 million grant which was entirely pocketed, citing his previous tour earnings from 2019. Comstock paid himself more than any other musician who received grant money.

== Discography ==
- Joytime (2016)
- Joytime II (2018)
- Joytime III (2019)
- Shockwave (2021)
- Sugar Papi (2023)

== Awards and nominations ==
Marshmello awards and nominations
Awards and nominations
Award	Wins	Nominations
American Music Awards	1	1
Billboard Music Awards	1	9
Teen Choice Awards	0	3
Radio Disney Music Awards	0	5
WDM Radio Awards	0	2
mtvU Woodie Awards	0	1
Electronic Music Awards	0	1
Remix Awards	1	1
MTV EMA	1	1
iHeartRadio Music Awards	2	3
International Dance Music Awards	1	1
Grammy Awards	0	1

Totals (Note: Certain award groups do not simply award one winner. They acknowledge several different recipients, have runners-up, and have third place. Since this is a specific recognition and is different from losing an award, runner-up mentions are considered wins in this award tally. For simplification and to avoid errors, each award in this list has been presumed to have had a prior nomination.)
- Wins: 7
- Nominations: 27

Marshmello has been awarded Best Electronic at the 2018 MTV Europe Music Awards, his first major award win. Marshmello received nominations for works such as "Alone", "Wolves", "Silence" and "Friends".

Musician Wave has ranked him as one of the Top 20 highest net worth DJ/producers in the world and estimated his net worth to be US$50 million.

=== Billboard Music Awards ===
Year	Awards	Recipient	Outcome	Ref.
2018	Top Dance/Electronic Artist	Marshmello	Nominated	
2019	Top Dance/Electronic Artist	Marshmello	Nominated	
2019	Top Collaboration	"Happier"	Nominated	
2019	Top Dance/Electronic Song	"Happier"	Nominated	
2020	Top Dance/Electronic Artist	Marshmello	Nominated	
2020	Top Dance/Electronic Album	Marshmello: Fortnite Extended Set	Won	
2020	Top Dance/Electronic Song	"Here with Me" (with Chvrches)	Nominated	
2021	Top Dance/Electronic Artist	Marshmello	Nominated	
2022	Top Dance/Electronic Artist	Marshmello	Nominated	

=== Billboard Latin Music Awards ===
Year	Category	Recipient	Outcome	Ref.
2023	Crossover Artist of the Year	Marshmello	Won	
2023	Tropical Song of the Year	"El Merengue" (with Manuel Turizo)	Nominated	

=== DJ Magazine's top 100 DJs ===
Year	Position	Notes	Ref.
2016	28	New Entry	
2017	10	Up 18	
2018	10	No change	
2019	5	Up 5	
2020	11	Down 6	
2021	13	Down 2	
2022	26	Down 13	
2023	35	Down 9	
2024	34	Up 1	
2025	42	Down 8	

=== Electronic Music Awards ===
Year	Category	Recipient	Outcome	Ref.
2017	New Artist of the Year	Marshmello	Nominated	

=== Grammy Awards ===
Year	Category	Recipient	Outcome	Ref.
2022	Best Dance/Electronic Music Album	Shockwave	Nominated	

=== iHeartRadio Music Awards ===
Year	Category	Recipient	Outcome	Ref.
2019	Best New Pop Artist	Marshmello	Won	
2019	Dance Artist of the Year	Marshmello	Won	
2019	Producer of the Year	Marshmello	Nominated	
2019	Alternative Rock Song of the Year	"Happier"	Nominated	
2019	Dance Song of the Year	"Happier"	Nominated	
2019	Dance Song of the Year	"Friends" (with Anne-Marie)	Nominated	
2020	Dance Artist of the Year	Marshmello	Won	
2020	Dance Song of the Year	"Here with Me" (with Chvrches)	Nominated	
2021	Dance Artist of the Year	Marshmello	Won	
2025	Dance Song of the Year	"Water" (with Tyla)	Nominated	

=== iHeartRadio Titanium Awards ===
Year	Nominated work		Result	Ref
2019	"Happier"	1 Billion Total Audience Spins on iHeartRadio Stations	Won	

=== MTV Europe Music Awards ===
Year	Category	Recipient	Outcome	Ref.
2018	Best Electronic	Marshmello	Won	
2019	Best Electronic	Marshmello	Nominated	
2020	Best Electronic	Marshmello	Nominated	
2021	Best Electronic	Marshmello	Nominated	
2022	Best Electronic	Marshmello	Nominated	

=== MTV Woodies ===
Year	Category	Recipient	Outcome	Ref.
2017	Woodie to Watch	Marshmello	Nominated	

=== Radio Disney Music Awards ===
Year	Category	Recipient	Outcome	Ref.
2017	Best Dance Track	"Alone"	Nominated	

=== Remix Awards ===
Year	Category	Recipient	Outcome	Ref.
2017	Best Trap Remix	"Alarm" (Marshmello remix)	Nominated	
2017	Best Use of Vocal	"Alarm" (Marshmello remix)	Won	
2018	Song of the Year	"Wolves"	Nominated	
2018	Breakout Artist of the Year	Marshmello	Nominated	
2018	Best Dance Track	"Silence"	Nominated	

=== Teen Choice Awards ===
Year	Category	Recipient	Outcome	Ref.
2018	Choice Electronic/Dance Artist	Marshmello	Nominated	
2018	Breakout Artist	Marshmello	Nominated	
2018	Choice Electronic/Dance Song	"Friends"	Nominated	

=== WDM Radio Awards ===
Year	Category	Recipient	Outcome	Ref.
2017	Best New Talent	Marshmello	Nominated	
2017	Best Trending Track	"Alone"	Nominated	
