= Omar LinX =

Canadian rapper

- Origin: Toronto
- Genres: Hip hop, electro house, dubstep, future house
- Occupations: Rapper, songwriter, singer
- Years active: 2010–present
- Labels: Mad Decent, Ultra Records and Jackie Boy Inc

Omar LinX is a Mexican Canadian rapper, songwriter, musician and singer. He is known for writing and performing in a variety of genres, often through collaborations with electronic dance music (EDM) and hip-hop producers.

== History ==
LinX co-wrote songs for Wake Up, which was released by Zeds Dead in February 2010. LinX has since collaborated on a number of songs with the group, including their first official single re-release, "Rudeboy", and "Out for Blood", which has been viewed more than five million times on YouTube. The group has released several other projects which include his contributions, including the Living Dead EP on Ultra Records and music video and the Victor EP on electronic music label Mad Decent.

In July 2011, LinX released his debut album City of Ommz.

In February 2012 Zeds Dead and Omar LinX launched the Living Dead Tour, with opening acts AraabMUZIK, XI, Memorecks, Mat the Alein, and Knight Riderz.

In December 2014 LinX released his highly anticipated sophomore album M.O.R.

In November 2015 he released Back To You with Hunter Siegel and Pro Logic on Buygore Records, with a remix pack with Kname, Axel Boy, Da bow, Lumberjvck, and Algo.

In 2015 LinX continued to tour and perform his own songs.

In 2016, LinX featured in "Keep It Mello" by future bass DJ and producer, Marshmello, and released the music video for the single "Black Rose" from his M.O.R album.

In 2017, LinX released "621" on his SoundCloud account. The song featured Hunter Siegel, a fellow Canadian and DJ.

In 2022 LinX would release his second full-length album, As Promised.
