= Alone (Marshmello song) =

Single by Marshmello

from the album Cataclysm
- Released: May 13, 2016
- Genre: Trap; future bass
- Length: 4:33 (original mix); 3:20 (radio edit)
- Label: Monstercat
- Songwriter: Christopher Comstock
- Producer: Marshmello

Marshmello singles chronology
"Colour" (2016)	"Alone" (2016)	"Magic" (2016)

Music video
- "Alone" on YouTube

Alone (The Remixes)
- Alone (The Remixes) cover

"Alone" is a single by American DJ and record producer Marshmello. It was first released in May 2016, then later released as a digital download on June 17, 2016 on iTunes and for streaming on Spotify. Upon its release, it charted on the Canadian Hot 100 at 56 and US Billboard Hot 100 at 60, and its music video has received over 2.6 billion views as of July 2025 on YouTube. In February 2019, it reached a new peak of 28 on the Billboard Hot 100 after it was featured in a virtual concert by Marshmello in the video game Fortnite Battle Royale. It is also the first and only Monstercat song to be certified Platinum (or higher) by the RIAA.

== Music video ==
The music video for "Alone" was released on July 2, 2016 on both Marshmello and Monstercat's YouTube channels. It is the 26th most liked YouTube video.

The music video was filmed at The Pegasus School in California.The video shows Marshmello being bullied by his fellow schoolmates. A sympathetic classmate goes to his house after school, but sees him creating music. She decides to record and share a video of her findings and Marshmello becomes more popular overnight. The video ends with Marshmello taking out his DJ controller, a Native Instruments Traktor Kontrol S4 MK2, and stirring up a dance party in his classroom.

During the video, Marshmello is shown placing a rat in a cage with the label "Joel" on the front. This is reference to Canadian electronic music producer and DJ Joel "deadmau5" Zimmerman. The reason behind this joke was a series of tweets posted by the Canadian DJ blasting Marshmello for his "poor music" and calling his followers "brain-dead sheep". Marshmello responded jokingly asking if deadmau5 wanted to have a basketball match and the loser would buy dinner, after which, the Canadian DJ deleted all of his tweets that disputed Marshmello.

A Fortnite music video was released on October 14, 2019 on Marshmello's YouTube channel.

== Reception and legacy ==
In 2017, Vice ranked it as the eighth best EDM song of all time.

== Track listing ==
Digital download
No.	Title	Length
1.	"Alone"	4:33

Digital download – Remixes EP
No.	Title	Length
1.	"Alone" (Slushii Remix)	4:19
2.	"Alone" (Getter Remix)	4:22
3.	"Alone" (Discord Remix)	3:04
4.	"Alone" (Streex Remix)	3:53
5.	"Alone" (Mrvlz Remix)	2:46
6.	"Alone" (Luca Lush Remix)	4:30
Total length:		22:54

== Charts ==
=== Weekly charts ===
Chart (2016–19)	Peak position
Argentina (Argentina Hot 100)	86
Australia Digital Tracks (ARIA)	30
Canada Hot 100 (Billboard)	11
Hungary (Single Top 40)	33
Ireland (IRMA)	100
Japan Hot 100 (Billboard)	39
Scotland Singles (OCC)	22
Sweden Heatseeker (Sverigetopplistan)	16
UK Singles (OCC)	61
US Billboard Hot 100	28
US Hot Dance/Electronic Songs (Billboard)	3

=== Year-end charts ===
Chart (2016)	Position
US Hot Dance/Electronic Songs (Billboard)	26
Chart (2017)	Position
US Hot Dance/Electronic Songs (Billboard)	59
Chart (2019)	Position
US Hot Dance/Electronic Songs (Billboard)	42

== Certifications ==
Region	Certification	Certified units/sales
Canada (Music Canada)	Platinum	80,000^{‡}
Italy (FIMI)	Gold	25,000^{‡}
New Zealand (RMNZ)	Platinum	30,000^{‡}
Spain (Promusicae)	Gold	30,000^{‡}
United Kingdom (BPI)	Gold	400,000^{‡}
United States (RIAA)	5× Platinum	5,000,000^{‡}
^{‡} Sales+streaming figures based on certification alone.

== Release history ==
Region	Date	Format	Version	Label	Ref.
United States	May 13, 2016	Digital download	Original	Monstercat	
United States	August 25, 2016	Digital download	Remixes EP	Monstercat	
