= Noah Cyrus discography =

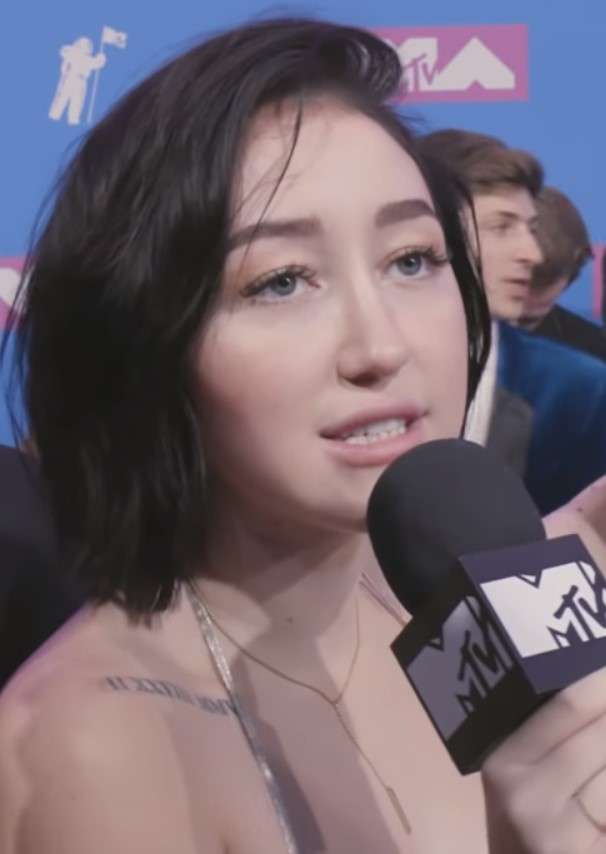
- Cyrus at the 2018 MTV Video Music Awards
- Studio albums: 2
- EPs: 4
- Singles: 27
- Promotional singles: 8

American singer Noah Cyrus has released two studio albums, four extended plays, 30 singles, and 9 promotional singles.

== Studio albums ==
Title	Details	Peak chart positions					
Title	Details	US Heat.	US Curr.	AUS DL	UK Amer.	UK Cou.	UK DL
The Hardest Part	Released: September 16, 2022; Label: Records, Columbia; Formats: CD, LP, digital download, streaming	13	92	31	6	10	50
I Want My Loved Ones to Go with Me	Released: July 11, 2025; Label: Records, Columbia; Formats: CD, LP, digital download, streaming	—	—	—	17	—	—
"—" denotes a recording that did not chart

== Extended plays ==
Title	Details	Peak chart positions					Certifications
Title	Details	US	US Heat.	AUS	CAN	UK DL	Certifications
Good Cry	Released: September 21, 2018; Label: Records, Columbia; Formats: Digital download, streaming	—	13	—	—	—	
The End of Everything	Released: May 15, 2020; Label: Records, Columbia; Formats: Digital download, streaming	124	1	64	45	88	RIAA: Gold; MC: Platinum
Spotify Singles	Released: March 11, 2021; Label: Records, Columbia; Formats: Streaming	—	—	—	—	—	
People Don't Change (with PJ Harding)	Released: April 23, 2021; Label: Records, RCA; Formats: Digital download, streaming	—	—	—	—	—	
"—" denotes a recording that did not chart

== Singles ==
=== As lead artist ===
List of singles as lead artist, showing year released, with selected chart positions, certifications and album name
Title	Year	Peak chart positions										Certifications	Album
Title	Year	US	AUS	CAN	DEN	IRE	NLD	NOR	NZ Hot	SWE	UK	Certifications	Album
"Ponyo on the Cliff by the Sea" (with Frankie Jonas)	2010	—	—	—	—	—	—	—	—	—	—		Ponyo on the Cliff By the Sea
"Make Me (Cry)" (featuring Labrinth)	2016	46	67	46	39	51	65	6	— (Note: "Make Me (Cry)" did not enter the NZ Top 40 Singles Chart, but peaked at number five on the NZ Heatseeker Singles Chart.)	20	88	RIAA: 2× Platinum; ARIA: Platinum; BPI: Silver; GLF: Platinum; IFPI DEN: Gold; MC: Platinum; RMNZ: Platinum	Non-album singles
"Stay Together"	2017	—	— (Note: "Stay Together" did not enter the Top 100 Singles Chart, but peaked at number 10 on the Hitseekers Singles chart.)	— (Note: "Stay Together" did not chart on the Canadian Hot 100, though did peak at number 48 on the CHR/Top 40 chart.)	—	—	—	—	— (Note: "Stay Together" did not enter the NZ Top 40 Singles Chart, but peaked at number five on the NZ Heatseeker Singles Chart.)	—	— (Note: "Stay Together" did not enter the Top 200 Singles Chart, but peaked at number 87 on the UK Singles Downloads Chart.)	RIAA: Gold; ARIA: Gold; MC: Gold	Non-album singles
"I'm Stuck"	2017	—	94	—	—	—	—	—	—	—	—		Non-album singles
"Again" (featuring XXXTentacion)	2017	— (Note: "Again" did not enter the Billboard Hot 100, but peaked at number 7 on the Bubbling Under Hot 100 Singles chart.)	—	91	—	—	—	—	— (Note: "Again" did not enter the NZ Top 40 Singles Chart, but peaked at number six on the NZ Heatseeker Singles Chart.)	—	—	RIAA: Platinum; BPI: Gold; MC: Gold; RMNZ: Platinum	Non-album singles
"My Way" (with One Bit)	2017	—	—	—	—	63	—	—	—	—	76	BPI: Silver	Non-album singles
"We Are..." (featuring MØ)	2018	—	—	—	—	—	—	—	—	—	—		Non-album singles
"Team" (with MAX)	2018	—	—	—	—	—	—	—	—	—	—		Non-album singles
"Lately" (with Tanner Alexander)	2018	—	—	—	—	—	—	—	—	—	—		Non-album singles
"Live or Die" (with Lil Xan)	2018	—	—	—	—	—	—	—	37	—	—		Non-album singles
"Mad at You" (with Gallant)	2018	—	—	—	—	—	—	—	—	—	—		Good Cry
"July" (solo or with Leon Bridges)	2019	85	40	40	—	24	97	30	8	73	66	RIAA: 6× Platinum; ARIA: 8× Platinum; BPI: 2× Platinum; GLF: 2× Platinum; IFPI DEN: 2× Platinum; MC: Diamond; RMNZ: 6× Platinum	The End of Everything
"Lonely"	2019	—	—	— (Note: "Lonely" did not enter the Canadian Hot 100 but did peak at number 42 on the Hot Canadian Digital Song Sales chart.)	—	—	—	—	16	—	—	RIAA: Gold; ARIA: Gold; MC: Platinum; RMNZ: Gold	The End of Everything
"Fuckyounoah" (featuring London on da Track)	2019	—	—	—	—	—	—	—	37	—	—		Non-album single
"This Is Us" (with Jimmie Allen)	2020	—	—	—	—	—	—	—	—	—	—	RIAA: Gold	Bettie James
"I Got So High That I Saw Jesus" (solo or live version featuring Miley Cyrus)	2020	—	—	—	—	—	—	—	33	—	—		The End of Everything
"Young & Sad"	2020	—	—	—	—	—	—	—	21	—	—	MC: Gold	The End of Everything
"All Three"	2020	—	—	—	—	—	—	—	—	—	—		Non-album single
"Dear August" (with PJ Harding)	2021	—	—	—	—	—	—	—	17	—	—		People Don't Change
"You Belong to Somebody Else" (with PJ Harding)	2021	—	—	—	—	—	—	—	—	—	—		People Don't Change
"I Burned LA Down"	2022	—	—	—	—	—	—	—	30	—	—		The Hardest Part
"Mr. Percocet"	2022	—	—	—	—	—	—	—	39	—	—		The Hardest Part
"Ready to Go"	2022	—	—	—	—	—	—	—	—	—	—		The Hardest Part
"Every Beginning Ends" (with Benjamin Gibbard)	2022	—	—	—	—	—	—	—	—	—	—		The Hardest Part
"I Just Want a Lover"	2022	—	—	—	—	—	—	—	—	—	—		The Hardest Part
"Everybody Needs Someone" (with Vance Joy)	2023	—	—	—	—	—	—	—	34	—	—		Non-album single
"Porcupine Tattoo" (with Everything Is Recorded and Bill Callahan)	2024	—	—	—	—	—	—	—	—	—	—		Richard Russell is Temporary
"Don't Put It All on Me" (with Fleet Foxes)	2025	—	—	—	—	—	—	—	—	—	—		I Want My Loved Ones to Go with Me
"I Saw the Mountains"	2025	—	—	—	—	—	—	—	—	—	—		I Want My Loved Ones to Go with Me
"New Country" (with Blake Shelton)	2025	—	—	—	—	—	—	—	—	—	—		I Want My Loved Ones to Go with Me
"Light Over The Hill"	2026	—	—	—	—	—	—	—	—	—	—		Reminders of Him
"—" denotes release that did not chart or was not released in that territory.

=== As featured artist ===
List of singles as featured artist, showing year released, with selected chart positions, certifications and album name
Title	Year	Peak chart positions						Certifications	Album
Title	Year	US Dance	AUS	GER	NOR	NZ Heat.	SWE	Certifications	Album
"Chasing Colors" (Marshmello and Ookay featuring Noah Cyrus)	2017	31	—	—	—	—	—		Non-album single
"Waiting" (Jake Bugg featuring Noah Cyrus)	2017	—	—	—	—	—	—		Hearts That Strain
"All Falls Down" (Alan Walker featuring Noah Cyrus and Digital Farm Animals)	2017	1	95	75	1	6	4	RIAA: Gold; ARIA: Gold; BPI: Silver; BVMI: Gold; GLF: 3× Platinum; MC: Platinum; RMNZ: Gold	Different World
"Slow" (Matoma featuring Noah Cyrus)	2017	31	—	—	30	—	87		One In a Million
"Expensive" (Rence featuring Noah Cyrus)	2019	—	—	—	—	—	—		Non-album single
"Do You Know What Is Right?" (Kid Trunks featuring Noah Cyrus)	2020	—	—	—	—	—	—		Moon
"Broken" (Lund featuring Lil Skies and Noah Cyrus)	2020	—	—	—	—	—	—	RMNZ: Gold	Non-album single
"As Long As You'll Stay" (Braison Cyrus featuring Noah Cyrus)	2025	—	—	—	—	—	—		Non-album single
"—" denotes items which were not released in that country or failed to chart.

=== Promotional singles ===
List of promotional singles, showing year released and album name
Title	Year	Album
"Almost Famous"	2017	Non-album promotional singles
"It's Beginning to Look a Lot Like Christmas"	2017	Non-album promotional singles
"Christmas (Baby Please Come Home)" (Amazon exclusive)	2017	Non-album promotional singles
"Dunno"	2020	Non-album promotional singles
"For Once in My Life"	2020	Non-album promotional singles
"Unfinished"	2022	The Hardest Part
"Noah (Stand Still)" (solo or with Billy Ray Cyrus)	2022	The Hardest Part
"Snow in LA" (with PJ Harding)	2022	Non-album promotional singles
"Oh What A Dream We Had" (with Billion Streams for Charity)	2025	Non-album promotional singles
"If There's A Heaven" (with Stephen Wilson Jr.)	2025	I Want My Loved Ones to Go with Me (Deluxe)
"Love Is a Canyon" (with Orville Peck)	2025	I Want My Loved Ones to Go with Me (Deluxe)

== Other charted songs ==
List of other charted songs, showing year released, with selected chart positions and album name
Title	Year	Peak chart positions			Album
Title	Year	US	US Country	NZ Hot	Album
"The Worst of You" (with PJ Harding)	2021	—	—	20	People Don't Change
"Easy" (with Demi Lovato)	2021	—	—	18	Dancing with the Devil... the Art of Starting Over
"My Fault" (with Shaboozey)	2024	— (Note: "My Fault" did not enter the Billboard Hot 100, but peaked at number 24 on the Bubbling Under Hot 100 chart.)	40	23	Where I've Been, Isn't Where I'm Going

== Guest appearances ==
List of other appearances, showing year released, other artist(s) credited and album name
Title	Year	Other artist(s)	Album	Notes
"Tulsa Time" (ROKMAN Remix)	2017	Billy Ray Cyrus, Derek Jones	Set the Record Straight	
"Come On My Way"	2019	Holdan	I Lost My Friends In The Spring	Background vocals
"Ecstasy"	2019	XXXTentacion	Bad Vibes Forever	
"The Girls"	2019	Iggy Azalea & Pabllo Vittar	Wicked Lips	Writing credits
"On Mine"	2020	Diplo	Diplo Presents Thomas Wesley, Chapter 1: Snake Oil	
"Intimate Moments"	2021	Isaac Dunbar	Evil Twin	Writing credits
"Closure"	2021	Sarcastic Sounds, Birdy & Mishaal Tamer	I'm A Disappointment	Writing credits
"How Far Will We Take It?"	2024	Orville Peck	Stampede	
"The Bruise"	2025	Damiano David & Suki Waterhouse	Funny Little Fears	Writing credits
"The Shadows"	2025	The Marcus King Band	Darling Blue	
"Atchafalaya"	2025	Orville Peck	Appaloosa	
"Prologue (Eulogy Of A Man Turned Mule)"	2026	Orville Peck, Emmylou Harris, Allison Russell	Mule	
"Ash and Snow"	2026	None	The Hunger Games: Sunrise on the Reaping	
