= Ookay discography =

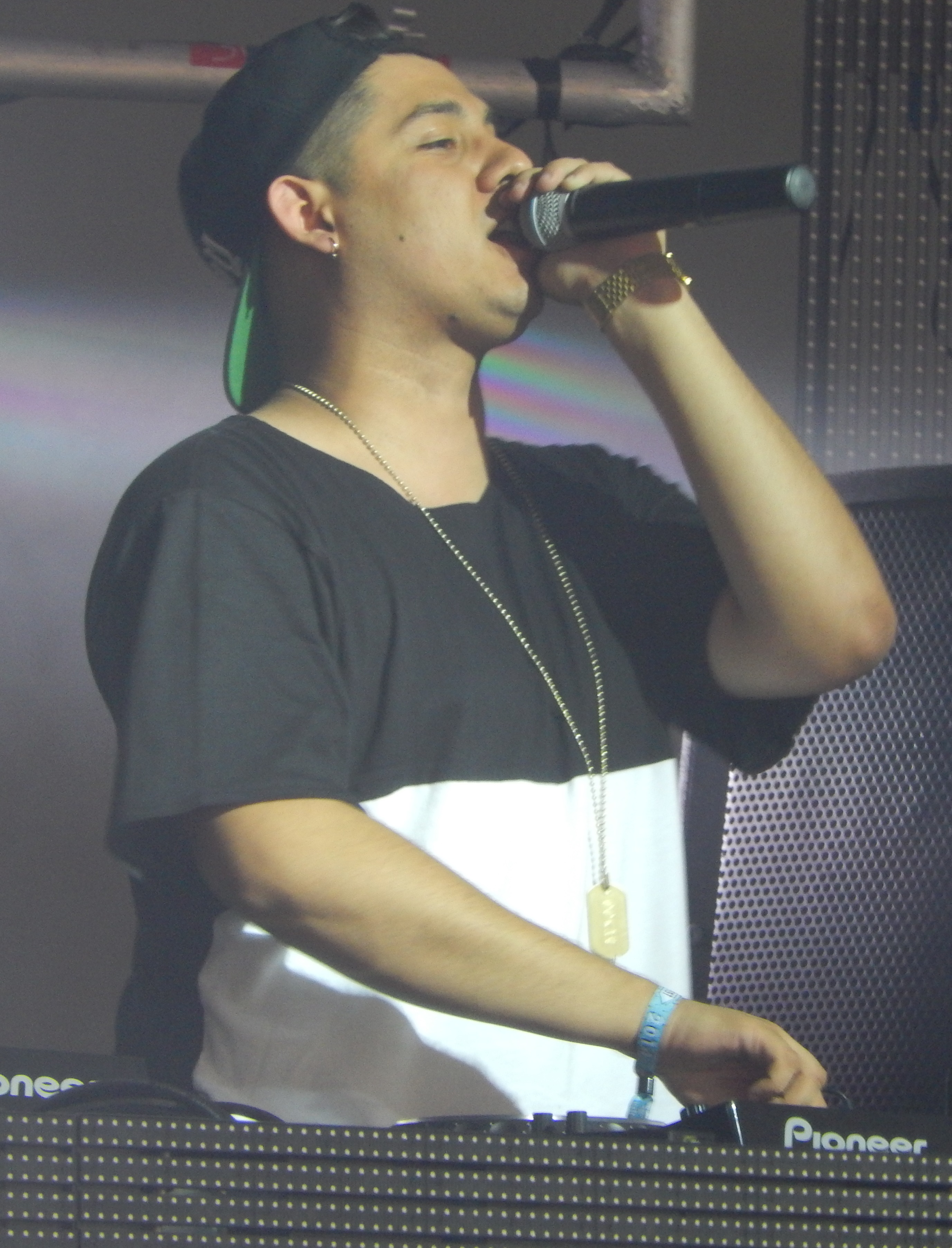
- Studio albums: 1
- EPs: 2
- Singles: 16
- Music videos: 4

The discography of the American electronic dance music producer Ookay consists of one studio album, two extended plays, sixteen singles and three music videos.

== Studio albums ==
Title	Album details
Wow! Cool Album!	Released: May 4, 2018; Label: Self-released; Format: Digital download
Very Special!	Released: March 25, 2022; Label: Thirty Knots; Format: Digital download

== Extended plays ==
Title	Details
Ghost	Released: November 7, 2014; Label: Dim Mak Records; Format: Digital download
Cocoon	Released: October 7, 2016; Label: Self-released; Format: Digital download
Nice!	Released: December 14, 2018; Label: Self-released; Format: Digital download
Extended Play	Released: August 21, 2020; Label: That Woodwerk; Format: Digital download

== Singles ==
=== As lead artist ===
Single	Year	Peak chart positions		Certifications	Album
Single	Year	US Dance	US Airplay	Certifications	Album
"Sahara"	2013	—	—		Non-album singles
"Bouncer" (with Showtek)	2014	—	—		Non-album singles
"Yen" (with Pyramid Juke)	2014	—	—		Diamonds
"Blow Your Mind" (with Blvkstar featuring Borgore)	2015	—	—		The Buygore Album
"The Boot" (featuring Ragga Twins)	2016	—	—		Dim Mak Greatest Hits 2015: Originals
"Pop It Off" (with YDG)	2016	—	—		Non-album singles
"Thief"	2016	—	12	RIAA: Gold; RMNZ: Gold	Non-album singles
"Echo" (with Scott Sinjin)	2016	—	—		Non-album singles
"Only One" (with A-Trak)	2016	—	—		Fool's Gold Presents: Night Shift
"Buck"	2016	—	—		Non-album single
"Stay Forever"	2017	—	—		Wow! Cool Album!
"Chasing Colors" (with Marshmello featuring Noah Cyrus)	2017	31	32		Non-album singles
"Lighthouse" (with Fox Stevenson)	2017	—	35		Non-album singles
"Cool"	2018	—	—		Wow! Cool Album!
"Loved or Lost"	2018	—	—		Wow! Cool Album!
"Help Me Out"	2018	—	—		Wow! Cool Album!
"Bad Habits"	2018	—	—		Non-album singles
"Better Off"	2019	—	—		Non-album singles
"Sweat"	2019	—	—		Non-album singles
"Lecha"	2019	—	—		Non-album singles
"Loko" (with Nitti Gritti)	2019	—	—		What A Time To Be Alive
"Pull Up the Drop" (with Laxx)	2020	—	—		Non-album singles
"Poor Connection" (with Hydraliux)	2020	—	—		Non-album singles
"Alcohol"	2020	—	—		TBA
"Dinero"	2020	—	—		Non-album singles
"The Pit" (with Cesqeaux)	2020	—	—		Non-album singles
"Not Again"	2021	—	—		Non-album singles
"Be Ok" (with Elohim and Flux Pavilion)	2021	—	—		Non-album singles
"—" denotes a recording that did not chart or was not released.

=== As featured artist ===
Title	Year	Album
"Gem" (Bare featuring Ookay)	2013	Full Tilt - EP
"Tempura Roll" (Yultron featuring Ookay, Kayzo and Dotcom)	2016	Sushi, Friends & Everything Awesome - EP
"Moshpit" (Attila featuring Ookay)	2016	Chaos
"Love Thang" (YDG featuring Ookay)	2018	Non-album single

== Music videos ==
Song	Year	Artist	Note
"Bouncer"	2014	Ookay and Showtek	Own song
"Thief"	2016	Ookay	Own song
"Keep It Mello" (featuring Omar LinX)	2016	Marshmello	Guest appearance
"Fight 4 U"	2018	Ookay	Own song

== Remixes ==
2018

- Portugal. The Man — "Tidal Wave" (Ookay Remix)
- Jay Rock — "Win" (Ookay Remix)

2019

- Max and Quinn XCII — "Love Me Less" (Ookay Remix)

2020

- Moody Good — "Jimmytics" (Ookay Remix)
- Rico Nasty — "iPhone" (Ookay Remix)

2022

- Quix — "Run Like The Wind" (Ookay Remix)
