= Dominic Purcell =

Australian actor (born 1970)

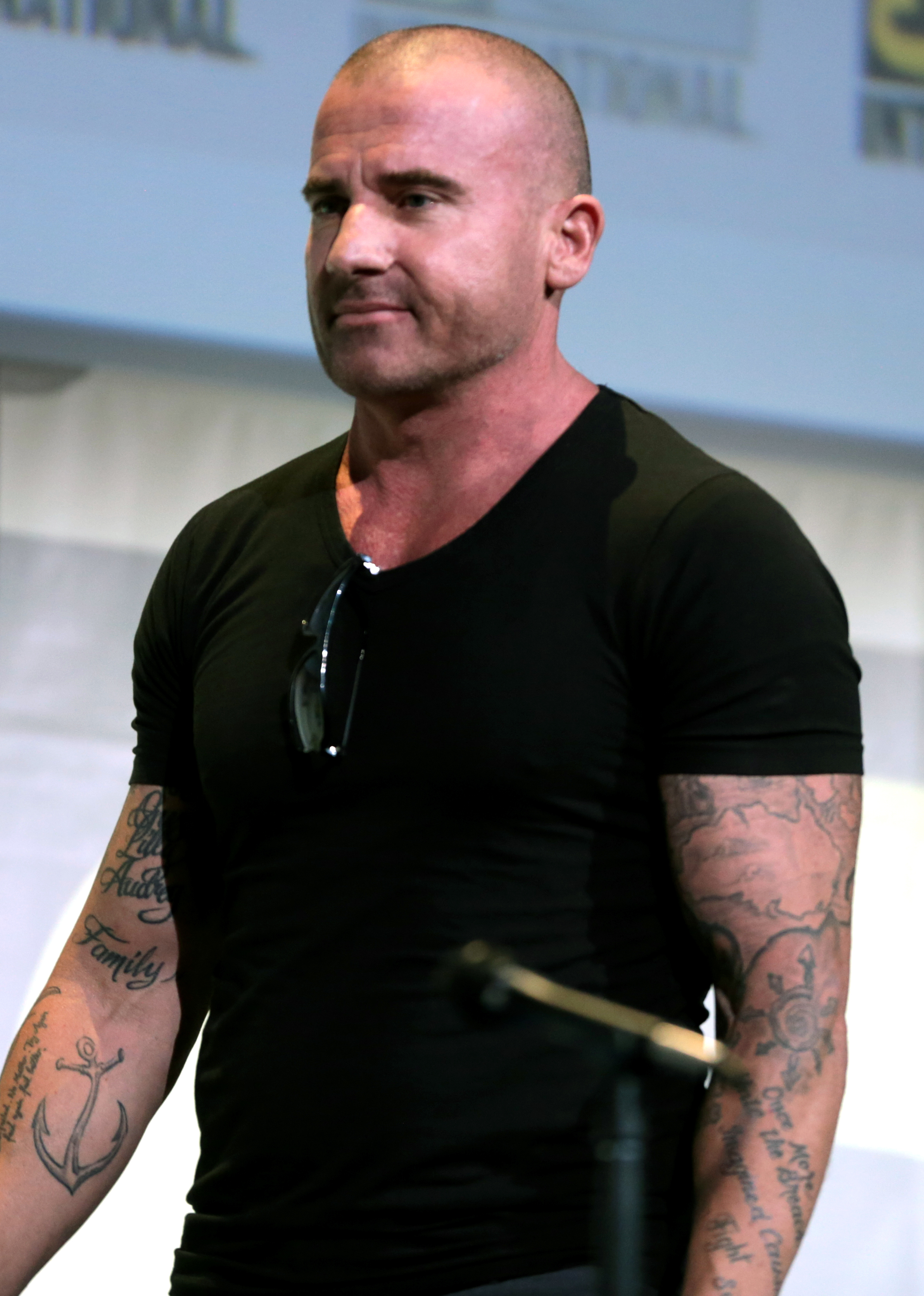
- Purcell at the 2016 San Diego Comic-Con
- Born: Dominic Haakon Myrtvedt Purcell; 17 February 1970 (age 56); Birkenhead, Merseyside, England
- Citizenship: Australia; United Kingdom; Ireland
- Occupation: Actor
- Years active: 1991–present
- Spouses: Rebecca Williamson (m. 1998; div. 2008) Tish Cyrus (m. 2023)
- Children: 4 (including Joseph)

Dominic Haakon Myrtvedt Purcell (born 17 February 1970) is an Australian actor. He is best known as Lincoln Burrows in Prison Break (2005–09; 2017), Mick Rory / Heat Wave in The Flash (2014–16) and Legends of Tomorrow (2016–21), and Drake / Dracula in Blade: Trinity (2004).

== Early life ==
Purcell was born in Birkenhead, Merseyside, England. He is the son of Phil Myrtvedt and Maureen (née Clarke) Purcell. His mother was Irish and his father was English of Norwegian descent. In 1972, he and his family moved to Sydney, New South Wales, Australia, initially living in Bondi before settling in Penrith.

He later attended the Australian Theatre for Young People and then enrolled at the Western Australian Academy of Performing Arts, where he studied with Hugh Jackman. He holds triple British-Irish-Australian citizenship, being British automatically by virtue of being born in the United Kingdom to a British citizen father, being Irish automatically through his mother and Australian via naturalisation.

== Personal life ==
Purcell was married to Rebecca Williamson from 1998 until 2008, during which time the couple had four children, including Joseph.

In 2011, Purcell started dating former 90210 actress AnnaLynne McCord; in 2014, the couple announced an amicable split, though they rekindled their romance a year later.

In November 2022, he started dating Tish Cyrus, the mother of Brandi, Trace, Noah, and Miley Cyrus. The couple publicly announced their engagement via a post on Instagram in April 2023. They married in August 2023 in Malibu, California.

On 1 June 2016, Purcell suffered severe injuries on set in Morocco, after a misplaced iron bar used as a Prison Break season 5 set piece fell on his head. He was immediately airlifted from Ouarzazate to Casablanca, where he received emergency treatment for nasal fractures and various other injuries.

== Filmography ==
=== Film ===
Year	Title	Role	Notes
2000	Mission: Impossible 2	Ulrich	
2001	Scenes of the Crime	Mark	
2002	Equilibrium	Seamus	
2003	Visitors	Luke	
2004	Three Way	Lew Brookbank	Also associate producer
2004	Blade: Trinity	Drake	
2006	The Gravedancers	Harris McKay	
2007	Primeval	Tim Manfrey	
2009	Blood Creek	Victor Alan Marshall	
2009	Balibo	—N/a	Producer
2011	Escapee	Harmon Jaxon	
2011	Straw Dogs	Jeremy Niles	
2011	Killer Elite	Davies	
2011	House of the Rising Sun	Tony Zello	
2012	Bad Karma	Mack	
2012	Hijacked	Otto Southwell	
2013	Officer Down	Royce Walker	
2013	Assault on Wall Street	Jim Baxford	
2013	Vikingdom	Eirick	
2013	Suddenly	Baron	
2013	Breakout	Tommy Baxter	
2013	Ice Soldiers	Malraux	
2014	In the Name of the King 3: The Last Mission	Hazen Kaine	
2014	The Ganzfeld Haunting	Detective Malone	
2014	The Bag Man	Larson	
2014	A Fighting Man	"Sailor" O'Connor	
2014	I Choose	N/A	Short film; also producer
2014	Turkey Shoot	Rick Tyler	
2015	Abandoned	James Nalepka	
2015	Gridlocked	David Hendrix	
2015	Isolation	Max	Also executive producer
2021	Blood Red Sky	Berg	
2023	Assassin	Adrian	
2023	Confidential Informant	Tom Moran	
2024	Cassino in Ischia	Nic Cassino	

=== Television ===
Year	Title	Role	Notes
1991	Home and Away	Constable Rogers	3 episodes
1997–1998	Raw FM	Granger Hutton	13 episodes
1998	Moby Dick	Bulkington	2 episodes
1998	Water Rats	Alex	2 episodes
1999	Heartbreak High	Todd Gillespie	6 episodes
1999	Silent Predators	Truck Driver	Television film
1999	First Daughter	Troy Nelson	Television film
2001	BeastMaster	Kelb	5 episodes
2001	The Lost World	Condillac	Episode: "The Travelers"
2001	Invincible	Keith Grady	Television film
2002–2003	John Doe	John Doe	21 episodes
2004–2005	North Shore	Tommy Ravetto	5 episodes
2004	House	Ed Snow	Episode: "Fidelity"
2005–2009, 2017	Prison Break	Lincoln Burrows	Main role (seasons 1–5); 90 episodes; also producer
2009	Prison Break: The Final Break	Lincoln Burrows	Television film
2011	Castle	Russell Ganz	Episode: "To Love and Die in L.A."
2012	Common Law	John Crowl	Episode: "Gun!"
2014–2016	The Flash	Mick Rory / Heat Wave	5 episodes
2015	Superhero Fight Club	Mick Rory / Heat Wave	Television short promo video
2016–2021	Legends of Tomorrow	Mick Rory / Heat Wave	Main role (seasons 1–6); 97 episodes
2017	Supergirl	Mick Rory / Heat Wave	Episode: "Crisis on Earth-X, Part 1"
2017	Arrow	Mick Rory / Heat Wave	Episode: "Crisis on Earth-X, Part 2"
2019	Batwoman	Mick Rory / Heat Wave (Earth-74)	Episode: "Crisis on Infinite Earths, Part 2"

=== Video games ===
Year	Title	Voice role	Notes
2010	Prison Break: The Conspiracy	Lincoln Burrows	

== Awards and nominations ==
Year	Award	Category	Work	Result	Refs
2007	AACTA Awards	Best Actor	Prison Break	Won	
2009	Inside Film Awards	Best Feature Film	Balibo	Nominated	
