= I Want My Loved Ones to Go with Me Tour =

2025 concert tour by Noah Cyrus

- Tour by Noah Cyrus
- Associated album: I Want My Loved Ones to Go with Me
- Start date: September 12, 2025
- End date: October 24, 2025
- Legs: 1
- No. of shows: 28

Noah Cyrus concert chronology
- The Hardest Part Tour (2022-2023); I Want My Loved Ones to Go with Me Tour (2025)

I Want My Loved Ones to Go with Me Tour is the fourth concert tour by American singer Noah Cyrus, in support of her second studio album, I Want My Loved Ones to Go with Me (2025). The tour begins on September 12, 2025, in Santa Ana, California and ends on October 24, 2025, in Phoenix, Arizona.

== Development ==
Following a short interval, Noah Cyrus returned to music with the single "Don't Put It All on Me", a collaboration with the indie folk band Fleet Foxes. It was released by Records Label and Columbia Records on March 19, 2025, alongside a music video directed by Luis Villanueva, and a press release that teased more music from Cyrus. A second single, titled "I Saw the Mountains", was released on May 16 alongside a video directed by Rudy Grazziani and Navs.

Cyrus announced her second album, I Want My Loved Ones to Go with Me, on June 16, 2025, along with its cover artwork and track listing. The album contains eleven tracks and is set to be released on July 11, 2025, through Records and Columbia. Cyrus, Mike Crossey and PJ Harding co-produced the album, while Fleet Foxes, Ella Langley, Blake Shelton, and Bill Callahan appear as guests performers. The third single, "New Country" with Shelton, was released on June 20. To support the album, Cyrus announced that she would embark on a North American concert tour, commencing in September 2025.

== Tour dates ==
List of concerts, showing date, city, country and venue.
Date	City	Country	Venue	Supporting act
North America
September 12, 2025	Santa Ana	United States	The Observatory	Gabrielle Hope
September 13, 2025	San Diego	United States	House of Blues	Gabrielle Hope
September 15, 2025	San Francisco	United States	The Regency Ballroom	Gabrielle Hope
September 18, 2025	Vancouver	Canada	Queen Elizabeth Theatre	Gabrielle Hope
September 19, 2025	Seattle	United States	Showbox SoDo	Gabrielle Hope
September 20, 2025	Spokane	United States	Knitting Factory	Gabrielle Hope
September 21, 2025	Portland	United States	McMenamis Crystal Ballroom	Gabrielle Hope
September 23, 2025	Salt Lake City	United States	The Union Event Center	Gabrielle Hope
September 24, 2025	Denver	United States	The Fillmore Auditorium	Gabrielle Hope
September 26, 2025	Kansas City	United States	Uptown Theater	Gabrielle Hope
September 27, 2025	Minneapolis	United States	The Fillmore Minneapolis	Gabrielle Hope
September 29, 2025	St Louis	United States	The Pageant	Gabrielle Hope
September 30, 2025	Chicago	United States	Riviera Theatre	Carter Faith
October 2, 2025	Detroit	United States	Masonic Jack White Theatre	Carter Faith
October 4, 2025	Montreal	Canada	MTELUS	Carter Faith
October 5, 2025	Toronto	Canada	All Things Go Music Festival	—N/a
October 7, 2025	Boston	United States	House of Blues	Carter Faith
October 8, 2025	New York City	United States	Brooklyn Paramount	Carter Faith
October 10, 2025	Philadelphia	United States	The Fillmore Philadelphia	Carter Faith
October 11, 2025	Silver Spring	United States	The Fillmore Silver Spring	Carter Faith
October 13, 2025	Charlotte	United States	The Fillmore Charlotte	Carter Faith
October 15, 2025	Nashville	United States	Ryman Auditorium	Carter Faith; Braison Cyrus
October 17, 2025	Atlanta	United States	Tabernacle	Carter Faith
October 18, 2025	St. Petersburg	United States	Jannus Live	Braison Cyrus
October 20, 2025	Houston	United States	House of Blues	Braison Cyrus
October 21, 2025	Dallas	United States	House of Blues	Braison Cyrus
October 22, 2025	Austin	United States	Emo's Austin	Braison Cyrus
October 24, 2025	Phoenix	United States	The Van Buren	Gabrielle Hope
Oceania
November 20, 2025	Melbourne	Australia	Palais Theatre	
November 22, 2025	Kiama	Australia	Changing Tides Festival	—N/a
November 23, 2025	Sydney	Australia	Roundhouse	
November 24, 2025	Brisbane	Australia	Fortitude Music Hall	
