= Tushar Apte =

21st-century Australian record producer

- Also known as: T.Apte
- Born: Newcastle, Australia
- Genres: Pop; urban contemporary
- Occupations: Record producer; songwriter
- Years active: 2015-present
- Label: Warner Chappell Music

Tushar Apte is an Australian record producer and songwriter based in Los Angeles, best known for his work with Chris Brown (on "Zero"), BTS (on "Home"), Blackpink (on "Love to Hate Me"), Demi Lovato (on "Sober"), Zayn Malik and Nicki Minaj (on "No Candle No Light"), PJ Morton and Adam Levine (on "Heavy"), Noah Cyrus (on "Good Cry" and "Ghost"), Lu Han (on "Roleplay"), Benson Boone (on "Ghost Town") and others. Apte is also an accomplished TV & film composer, having worked on major projects for NBC, BET (including the Award-winning feature The Bobby Brown Story), ITV and more.

Apte was the recipient of 2022 'Rising Star' award presented at the G'Day USA Arts Gala, alongside Isla Fisher, Ron Howard and Brian Grazer.
