= I Want My Loved Ones to Go with Me =

2025 album by Noah Cyrus

Studio album by Noah Cyrus
- Released: July 11, 2025
- Length: 42:14
- Label: Records; Columbia
- Producer: Noah Cyrus; Robin Pecknold; Mike Crossey; Dave Hamelin

Noah Cyrus chronology
The Hardest Part (2022)	I Want My Loved Ones to Go with Me (2025)

Singles from I Want My Loved Ones to Go with Me
- 1. "Don't Put It All on Me" Released: March 19, 2025; 2. "I Saw the Mountains" Released: May 16, 2025; 3. "New Country" Released: June 20, 2025

I Want My Loved Ones to Go with Me is the second studio album by the American singer Noah Cyrus, released on July 11, 2025, through Records Label and Columbia Records. The album serves as the follow-up to Cyrus's debut album, The Hardest Part (2022), and includes guest appearances from Fleet Foxes, Ella Langley, Blake Shelton, and Bill Callahan. As part of its promotion, the singles "Don't Put It All on Me", "I Saw the Mountains", and "New Country" preceded the album.

== Release and promotion ==
Following a short interval, Noah Cyrus returned to music with the single "Don't Put It All on Me", a collaboration with the indie folk band Fleet Foxes. It was released by Records Label and Columbia Records on March 19, 2025, alongside a music video directed by Luis Villanueva, and a press release that teased more music from Cyrus. The song features melancholic and nostalgic themes, and was written about Cyrus's role in their family, according to her brother's perspective. The release of the song followed an increasing public feud between the family after the divorce of Tish and Billy Ray Cyrus. A second single, titled "I Saw the Mountains", was released on May 16 alongside a video directed by Rudy Grazziani and Navs.

Cyrus announced her second album, I Want My Loved Ones to Go with Me, on June 16, 2025, along with its cover artwork and track listing. The album contains eleven tracks and was released on July 11, 2025, through Records and Columbia. Cyrus, Mike Crossey and PJ Harding co-produced the album, while Fleet Foxes, Ella Langley, Blake Shelton, and Bill Callahan appear as guests performers. The third single, "New Country" with Shelton, was released on June 20. To support the album, Cyrus started a North American concert tour, the I Want My Loved Ones to Go with Me Tour, commenced in September 2025.

== Track listing ==
I Want My Loved Ones to Go with Me track listing
No.	Title	Writer(s)	Producer(s)	Length
1.	"I Saw the Mountains"	Noah Cyrus; PJ Harding	Dave Hamelin; Mike Crossey; Harding^{[a]}	4:24
2.	"Don't Put It All on Me" (featuring Fleet Foxes)	Ben Cramer; Braison Cyrus	N. Cyrus; Robin Pecknold; Crossey; B. Cyrus^{[a]}	4:07
3.	"What's It All For?"	N. Cyrus; Harding	N. Cyrus; Harding; Crossey	2:22
4.	"Way of the World" (featuring Ella Langley)	N. Cyrus; Harding	N. Cyrus; Harding; Crossey; Austin Goodloe^{[a]}	2:49
5.	"New Country" (featuring Blake Shelton)	N. Cyrus; Sam Nelson Harris; Amy Wadge	N. Cyrus; Crossey	3:18
6.	"Long Ride Home"	N. Cyrus; Harding	N. Cyrus; Crossey; Harding^{[a]}; Stephen Sesso^{[m]}	3:04
7.	"Apple Tree"	N. Cyrus; Harding; Dernst Emile II; Mikky Ekko	N. Cyrus; Crossey; Sesso^{[m]}	5:56
8.	"Man in the Field"	N. Cyrus; Harding	N. Cyrus; Crossey	4:23
9.	"With You"	Billy Ray Cyrus	N. Cyrus; Crossey; Sam Ricci	2:53
10.	"Love Is a Canyon"	N. Cyrus; Wadge	N. Cyrus; Crossey; Hamelin	3:37
11.	"XXX" (with Bill Callahan)	N. Cyrus; Callahan	N. Cyrus; Crossey	5:21
Total length:				42:14

=== Notes ===
- ^{^[a]} signifies an additional producer
- ^{^[m]} signifies a miscellaneous producer

== Personnel ==
Credits adapted from Tidal.

=== Musicians ===
- Noah Cyrus – lead vocals (all tracks), background vocals (tracks 1–5, 8–10), bass synthesizer (7, 8); keyboards, percussion, piano (11)
- Mike Crossey – programming (1, 3–8, 10, 11), bass synthesizer (6), horn (8), keyboards (8)
- PJ Harding – acoustic guitar (1, 3–6), background vocals (1, 4–6), electric guitar (1), percussion (2, 4); bass, drums (4); piano (5–7)
- Dan Kalisher – electric guitar (1, 5, 6), pedal steel guitar (4, 5, 8), bass (5), acoustic guitar (8)
- Stephen Sesso – strings (1, 5), bass (3), keyboards (6, 7), acoustic guitar (8), programming (10)
- Dave Hamelin – bass, drums (1, 10); drum machine, electric guitar, programming, strings (1); keyboards, piano, programming (10)
- Drew Taubenfeld – pedal steel guitar (1, 10)
- Elias Mallin – drums (2, 5, 6), percussion (2)
- Roland Hamilton – piano (2), organ (4)
- Robin Pecknold – lead vocals, acoustic guitar, background vocals, bass, electric guitar, organ, percussion, piano (2)
- Ryan Richter – steel guitar (2)
- Gabe Witcher – fiddle (3, 11)
- Ella Langley – lead vocals, background vocals (4)
- Blake Shelton – lead vocals, background vocals (5)
- Adam Tressler – autoharp, banjo, dulcimer, mandolin (8)
- Isaiah Gage – violin (8)
- Sam Ricci – guitar (9)
- Ryan Svendsen – flugelhorn, trombone, trumpet (10)
- Amy Wadge – acoustic guitar (10)
- Patrick Krief – electric guitar (10)
- Liam O'Neil – organ (10)
- Bill Callahan – lead vocals, acoustic guitar, background vocals (11)

=== Technical ===
- Mike Crossey – mixing
- Robin Schmidt – mastering
- Stephen Sesso – engineering
- Austin Goodloe – engineering (4)
- Scott Hendricks – engineering (5)
- Sam Ricci – engineering (9)
- Dave Hamelin – engineering (10)
- Ryan Svendsen – engineering (10)

== Charts ==
Chart performance for I Want My Loved Ones to Go with Me
Chart (2025)	Peak position
Australian Country Albums (ARIA)	32
