= Brighton Hall School =

Brighton Hall
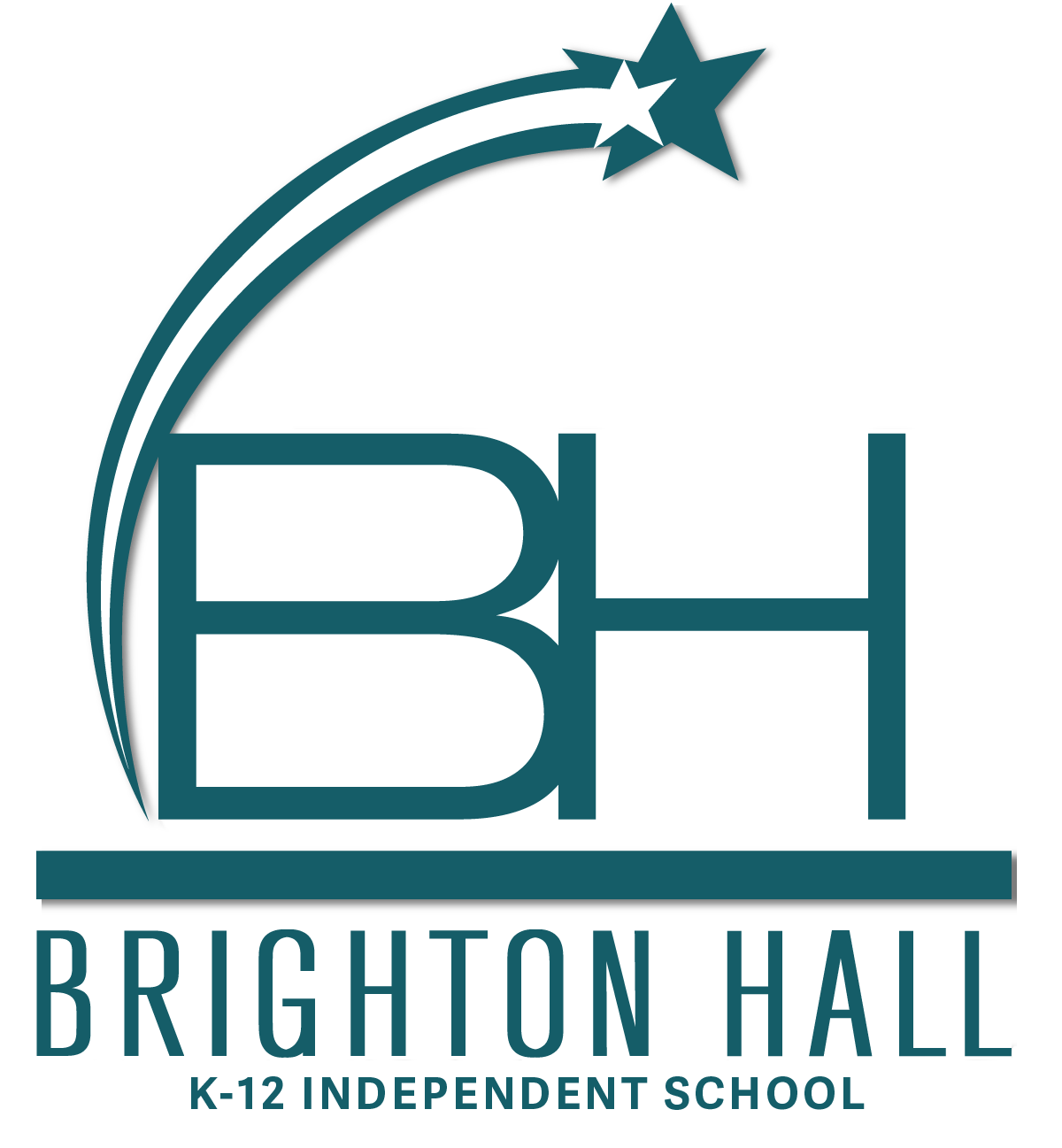

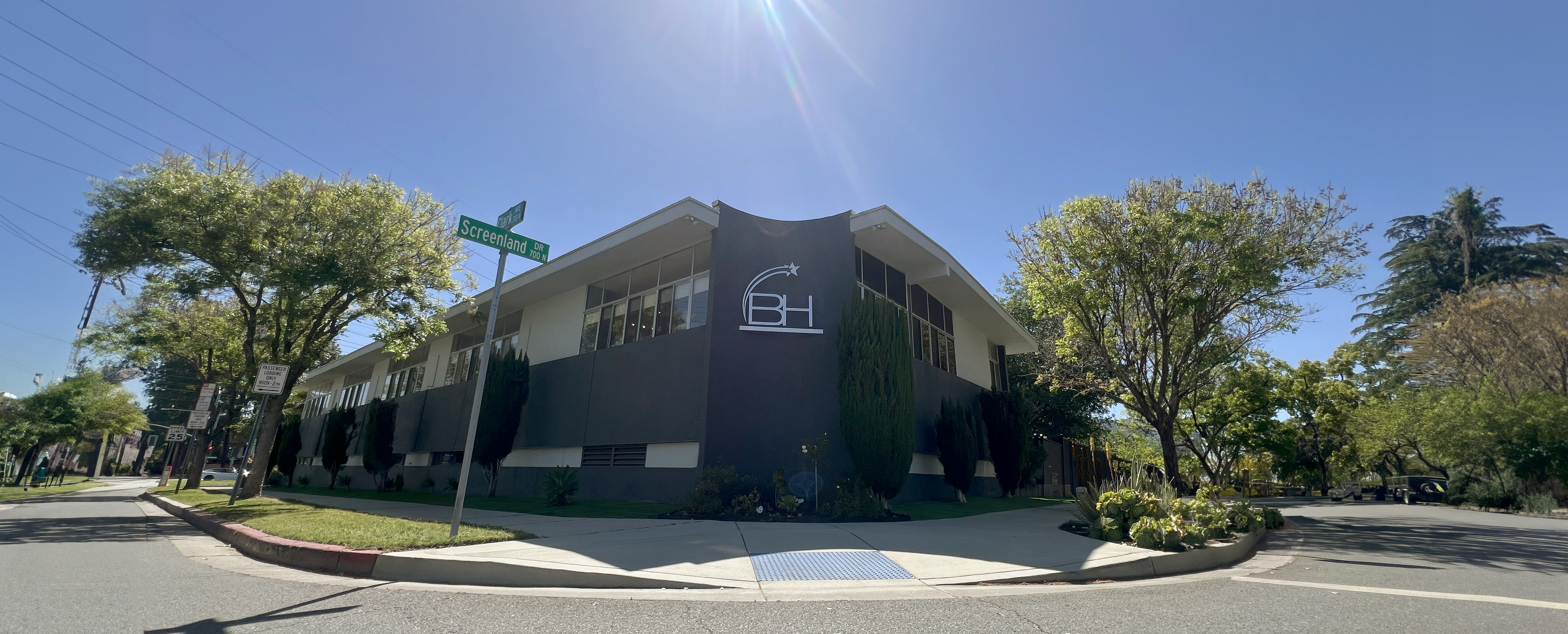

Location
- 755 N. Whitnall Highway; Burbank, CA 91505; United States; 34.1641°N 118.3459°W

Information
- Type: Private
- Established: 1961
- Closed: June 5, 2026
- Head of School: Niranjala "Angie" Peiris
- Grades: K-12
- Gender: Coeducational
- Enrollment: 75-100
- Accreditation: WASC
- Website: www.brightonhallschool.org

Brighton Hall was an independent, coeducational K-12 day school located in the Magnolia Park neighborhood of Burbank, California, United States.

Founded in 1961 as the San Fernando Valley Professional School, the school offered a flexible academic program designed to support child performers, young professionals, and students with individualized learning needs, on both a full and part-time basis.

== History ==
Founded in 1961, was a school for child actors. The school provided a secular, academic-focused education to many notable performers. In 1992, with growing enrollment and increasing demand for space, the school moved its campus to Burbank, where the campus remained until the school's closure in 2026. In 1997, ownership of the school was transferred to former director, Angie Peiris, under whose leadership it achieved WASC accreditation and gained entry to the National Association for College Admission Counseling.

After the COVID-19 pandemic, the school expanded its academic program to include both virtual and hybrid attendance options, though the majority of its student body attends in-person classes held on its Burbank campus.

In 2024, the school launched an after-school program serving both its own students and those from neighboring schools.

== Closure ==
Brighton Hall School ceased operating as a K–12 independent school on June 5, 2026. Following the closure of its school program, the organization now operates solely as StarBright Learning Center, providing K - 12 educational support and enrichment services.

== Notable alumni ==
=== Actors ===
- Isabella Acres
- Tucker Albrizzi
- Jason Bateman
- Jonathan Brandis
- Danielle Brisebois
- Zayne Emory
- Kaj-Erik Eriksen
- Soleil Moon Frye
- Emily Grace Reaves
- Madison De La Garza
- Frankie Jonas
- Olivia Rose Keegan
- Kyla Kenedy
- Kira Kosarin
- Michael Eric Reid
- Patrick Labyorteaux
- Shia LaBeouf
- Annie LeBlanc
- Blake Lively
- Jason Lively
- Rio Mangini
- Indiana Massara
- Sierra McCormick
- Brittany Murphy
- Thomas Ian Nicholas
- Alfonso Ribeiro
- Britt Robertson
- Dylan Sprayberry
- Sydney Sweeney

=== Athletes ===
- Lisa-Marie Allen
- Tai Babilonia
- Christopher Bowman

=== Musicians ===
- Janet Jackson
- Noah Cyrus
