= The Hardest Part Tour =

2022–2023 concert tour by Noah Cyrus

- Tour by Noah Cyrus
- Associated album: The Hardest Part
- Start date: October 4, 2022
- End date: October 1, 2023
- Legs: 2
- No. of shows: 56

Noah Cyrus concert chronology
- The Not So Tour, Tour (2020); The Hardest Part Tour (2022–2023)

The Hardest Part Tour is the third concert tour by American singer Noah Cyrus, in support of her debut studio album, The Hardest Part (2022). The tour begins on October 4, 2022, in Phoenix, Arizona and ends on October 1, 2023, in Columbia, Missouri.

== Development ==
Cyrus first announced on April 8, 2022, that her debut studio album The Hardest Part would be released on July 15, 2022, with the release of its lead single "I Burned LA Down". Later that week, she announced that she would embark on The Hardest Part Tour in support of it. European dates were announced first, which included her involvement on Justin Bieber's Justice World Tour in Helsinki, Finland and her performance in the Pukkelpop and Lowlands festivals in the Netherlands and Belgium, respectively. After the release of the second single of the album, "Mr. Percocet", dates for the North American leg were announced, including her performances in the Austin City Limits Music Festival in Austin, Texas.

On July 28, 2022, Cyrus announced all European dates were cancelled due to unforeseen circumstances.

== Setlist ==
1. "Noah (Stand Still)"
2. "Mr. Percocet"
3. "Unfinished"
4. "Liar"
5. "The Worst Of You"
6. "Ready To Go"
7. "All Three"
8. "My Side Of The Bed"
9. "Loretta's Song"
10. "I'll Fly Away (Alison Krauss cover)"
11. "I Got So High That I Saw Jesus"
12. "Again"
13. "I Just Want A Lover"
14. "Every Beginning Ends"
15. "I Burned LA Down"
16. "Hardest Part"

== Tour dates ==
List of concerts, showing date, city, country and venue.
Date	City	Country	Venue	Supporting act
North America
October 4, 2022	Phoenix	United States	Crescent Ballroom	gigi
October 5, 2022	Albuquerque	United States	El Rey Theater	gigi
October 7, 2022	Austin	United States	Zilker Park	—
October 9, 2022	Houston	United States	House of Blues	gigi
October 10, 2022	Oklahoma City	United States	Tower Theatre	gigi
October 11, 2022	Fort Worth	United States	Tannahill's Tavern & Music Hall	gigi
October 13, 2022	Dallas	United States	The Echo Lounge & Music Hall	gigi
October 14, 2022	Austin	United States	Zilker Park	—
October 16, 2022	Nashville	United States	Marathon Music Works	gigi
October 17, 2022	Atlanta	United States	Buckhead Theatre	gigi
October 18, 2022	Brooklyn	United States	National Sawdust	gigi
October 19, 2022	Brooklyn	United States	Brooklyn Steel	gigi
October 20, 2022	Philadelphia	United States	Theatre of Living Arts	gigi
October 21, 2022	Washington, D.C.	United States	9:30 Club	gigi
October 22, 2022	Boston	United States	Paradise Rock Club	gigi
October 24, 2022	Montreal	Canada	Le Studio Td	gigi
October 25, 2022	Toronto	Canada	Phoenix Concert Theatre	gigi
October 27, 2022	Chicago	United States	House of Blues	gigi
October 28, 2022	Kansas City	United States	The Truman	gigi
October 29, 2022	Minneapolis	United States	Varsity Theater	gigi
October 31, 2022	Denver	United States	Summit	gigi
November 1, 2022	Salt Lake City	United States	The Complex	gigi
November 3, 2022	San Francisco	United States	August Hall	gigi
November 4, 2022	Los Angeles	United States	The Wiltern	gigi
November 20, 2022	San Diego	United States	Wonderfront Festival	—
May 7, 2023	Redondo Beach	United States	BeachLife Festival	—
Oceania
July 19, 2023	Sydney	Australia	Metro Theatre	—
July 20, 2023	Melbourne	Australia	170 Russell	—
July 23, 2023	Byron Bay	Australia	Splendour in the Grass	—
North America
August 24, 2023	Vancouver	Canada	Vogue Theatre	—
August 26, 2023	Snohomish	United States	Snohomish Block Party	—
August 27, 2023	Spokane	United States	Knitting Factory	—
August 29, 2023	Boise	United States	Knitting Factory	—
August 31, 2023	Eugene	United States	McDonald Theatre	—
September 1, 2023	Portland	United States	McMenamins Crystal Ballroom	—
September 2, 2023	Seattle	United States	The Showbox	—
September 4, 2023	Palmer	United States	Alaska State Fair	—
September 6, 2023	Ogden	United States	Ogden Amphitheater	—
September 7, 2023	Boulder	United States	Boulder Theater	—
September 9, 2023	St. Louis	United States	Delmar Hall	—
September 10, 2023	Chattanooga	United States	Moon River Music Festival	—
September 12, 2023	Orlando	United States	Beacham Theatre	—
September 13, 2023	St. Petersburg	United States	Jannus Live	—
September 15, 2023	Columbia	United States	The Senate	—
September 16, 2023	Charlotte	United States	The Underground	—
September 17, 2023	Raleigh	United States	Lincoln Theatre	—
September 19, 2023	Charlottesville	United States	Jefferson Theater	—
September 20, 2023	Richmond	United States	National Theater	—
September 21, 2023	Norfolk	United States	The NorVa	—
September 23, 2023	Columbus	United States	Newport Music Hall	—
September 24, 2023	Detroit	United States	Majestic Theatre	—
September 26, 2023	Grand Rapids	United States	The Intersection	—
September 27, 2023	Newport	United States	MegaCorp Pavilion	—
September 28, 2023	Indianapolis	United States	The Deluxe	—
September 30, 2023	Louisville	United States	Mercury Ballroom	—
October 1, 2023	Columbia	United States	Treeline Music Fest	—

== Cancelled shows ==
Date	City	Country	Venue	Reason
August 9, 2022	Helsinki	Finland	Kaisaniemi Park	Unforeseen circumstances
August 10, 2022	Manchester	England	O_{2} Ritz	Unforeseen circumstances
August 11, 2022	London	England	O_{2} Forum	Unforeseen circumstances
August 13, 2022	Dublin	Ireland	The Academy	Unforeseen circumstances
August 14, 2022	Glasgow	Scotland	O_{2} Academy Glasgow	Unforeseen circumstances
August 16, 2022	Cologne	Germany	Die Kantine	Unforeseen circumstances
August 19, 2022	Biddinghuizen	Netherlands	Lowlands Festival	Unforeseen circumstances
August 20, 2022	Kiewit	Belgium	Pukkelpop	Unforeseen circumstances
August 23, 2022	Berlin	Germany	Columbia Theater	Unforeseen circumstances
August 24, 2022	Hamburg	Germany	Docks	Unforeseen circumstances
