= Joseph Purcell (actor) =

Australian-American actor (born 1999)

- Born: 12 August 1999 (age 27); Australia
- Occupation: Actor
- Parent(s): Dominic Purcell (father); Tish Cyrus (stepmother)
- Relatives: Trace, Noah, Brandi, and Miley Cyrus (stepsiblings)

Joseph Purcell (born 8 August 1999) is an Australian and American actor best known for acting in vertical dramas. He first gained attention for his acting on the vertical drama His Nerd on CandyJar, and has since starred in numerous other vertical dramas on the same platform. He is the son of Dominic Purcell and stepbrother of Miley Cyrus.

== Biography ==
Purcell was born in Australia. He originally wanted to become a professional athlete, but was inspired to become an actor after watching The Dark Knight, and dropped out of community college.

Purcell studied the Meisner technique at a theater for two and a half years before starting to act in microdramas in February 2025 after hearing that the jobs were steady. Despite submitting for a supporting role with CandyJar in His Nerd, he was instead offered the lead role; Purcell has since remained with CandyJar. He soon went viral on social media for his role in that series. He has become one of the most popular male leads in vertical drama.

Purcell has also starred in The Bad Boy Wants Me, Club of Desire, and Falling for my Bodyguard. These shows all received positive reviews from reviewers including Fangirlish.

He has also played the lead role in the Tubi Original film Glamping (2025). He has stated his dream role would be in a dark and gritty film.

== Personal life ==
Purcell is the son of Dominic Purcell, stepson of Tish Cyrus, and stepsibling of Miley Cyrus, Noah Cyrus, Brandi Cyrus, and Trace Cyrus. He is reportedly close with his stepmother. During an appearance on her podcast, they recounted how during the wedding of his dad and stepmother, his speech began: "I never, ever wanted my dad to get remarried. Then I met Tish."
