= The Hardest Part (Noah Cyrus album) =

Studio album by Noah Cyrus
- Released: September 16, 2022
- Genre: Country-soul; acoustic pop
- Length: 33:46
- Label: Records; Columbia
- Producer: Lionel Crasta; Mike Crossey; Tommy English; Jason Evigan; Benjamin Gibbard; J.R. Rotem; Mark Schick

Noah Cyrus chronology
People Don't Change (2021)	The Hardest Part (2022)	I Want My Loved Ones to Go with Me (2025)

Singles from The Hardest Part
- 1. "I Burned LA Down" Released: April 8, 2022; 2. "Mr. Percocet" Released: May 13, 2022; 3. "Ready to Go" Released: June 23, 2022; 4. "Every Beginning Ends" Released: August 26, 2022; 5. "I Just Want a Lover" Released: September 16, 2022

The Hardest Part is the debut studio album by American singer Noah Cyrus. It was released on September 16, 2022, by Records, LLC and Columbia Records. It was preceded by the singles "I Burned LA Down", "Mr. Percocet", "Ready to Go" and "Every Beginning Ends".

== Background ==
The Hardest Part was developed with producer Mike Crossey, known for his collaborations with The 1975, Wolf Alice and Arctic Monkeys. On working with him Cyrus said "I found a safe place to make music with people I love and trust. The process was really healing for me. For the first time, I'm revealing my complete and honest truth."

== Promotion ==
The album's lead single "I Burned LA Down" was released on April 8, 2022, alongside a music video and the announcement that the album would be released on July 15, 2022. The song is a country pop and indie folk ballad that contrasts the heartache of a breakup with the dread around California wildfire season and climate change. The song was accompanied by an "apocalyptic" music video that sees Cyrus standing "statuesque" as flames surround her. She performed the song on Jimmy Kimmel Live! on April 20, 2022.

"Mr. Percocet" was released as second single from the album on May 13, 2022, alongside music video. The country pop ballad about a toxic relationship impacted by substance abuse. In a Twitter thread, Cyrus expanded that she began using prescription drugs like xanax and percocet in 2018 and developed an addiction, exacerbated by the stress brought on by the COVID-19 pandemic, though she eventually quit in December 2020.

On June 24, 2022, Cyrus released "Ready to Go" as the album's third single. Describing it as a "cousin" to her 2019 song "July" due to their thematic similarities, saying "they're about different people, entirely different storylines, and each brings up different memories and emotions" and that "In a way, I see a lot of growth in myself from who I was then and who I am now, but at the same time it's still impossible for me to walk away from people I love, even when it's harmful to myself." The single was accompanied by the announcement that the release date of The Hardest Part had been delayed to September 16, 2022.

On August 26, Cyrus released "Every Beginning Ends", with Benjamin Gibbard as a surprise single.

In promotion of the album, Cyrus will embark on her first ever world tour, starting in August 2022.

== Critical reception ==
Professional ratings
Aggregate scores
Source	Rating
Metacritic	88/100
Review scores
Source	Rating
American Songwriter	4/5 stars
The Line of Best Fit	9/10
Rolling Stone	Positive
Sputnikmusic	4.4/5
The Telegraph	4/5 stars
Variety	Positive

The Hardest Part was met with widespread critical acclaim from music critics after its release. On Metacritic, which assigns a normalized score out of 100 to ratings from publications, the album received a score of 88, indicating "universal acclaim".

Maura Johnson of Rolling Stone wrote "A compact yet emotionally resonant collection of Laurel Canyon–recalling pop from the youngest member of the Cyrus clan. Channeling Cyrus' recent travails, which include the death of her grandmother, her parents’ romantic problems, and her own addiction to and recovery from Xanax, The Hardest Part is unflinching yet tender". Laura Freyaldenhoven of The Line of Best Fit stated that the album exceeded expectations, and wrote "With its attention to detail and exceptional vocal delivery, The Hardest Part is a debut for the ages. An album that is both culturally relevant and sonically refined to the point of timelessness. If Cyrus can make pain sound this beautiful, her take on love must be otherworldly". Jemm Aswad of Variety wrote "With 10 songs over just 33 minutes, it's a wide-ranging, emotional ride that leaves the listener wanting more. Almost six years after the release of her debut single, we get the feeling that Cyrus' career really starts here".

== Track listing ==
The Hardest Part standard edition
No.	Title	Writer(s)	Producer(s)	Length
1.	"Noah (Stand Still)"	Noah Cyrus; PJ Harding	Mike Crossey	3:55
2.	"Ready to Go"	Cyrus; Harding; Victoria Zaro; Britten Newbill; Luke Milano; Jeff Baranowski	Tommy English; Crossey	3:07
3.	"Mr. Percocet"	Cyrus; Harding; Sarah Hudson; Jason Evigan	Crossey; Evigan; Lionel Crasta; Mark Schick	3:13
4.	"Every Beginning Ends" (with Benjamin Gibbard)	Cyrus; Benjamin Gibbard	Crossey; Gibbard; Andy D. Park^{[a]}	2:30
5.	"Hardest Part"	Cyrus; Ilsey Juber	Crossey	3:43
6.	"I Just Want a Lover"	Cyrus; Laura Pergolizzi; Nate Campany; English	English; Crossey	3:21
7.	"Unfinished"	Cyrus; Juber; Dan Wilson; Jonathan Rotem	Crossey; J.R. Rotem	3:53
8.	"My Side of the Bed"	Cyrus; Harding	Crossey; Harding^{[c]}	3:06
9.	"I Burned LA Down"	Cyrus; Harding	Crossey; Harding^{[a]}	3:15
10.	"Loretta’s Song"	Cyrus; Harding	Crossey; Harding^{[c]}	3:41
Total length:				33:46

The Hardest Part – deluxe edition bonus tracks
No.	Title	Writer(s)	Producer(s)	Length
11.	"Noah (Stand Still)" (with Billy Ray Cyrus)	Cyrus; Harding	Crossey; Cyrus	3:54
12.	"Unfinished" (acoustic)	Cyrus; Juber; Wilson; Rotem	Crossey	4:07
13.	"Ready to Go" (string arrangement)	Cyrus; Harding; Zaro; Newbill; Milano; Baranowski	Crossey; English	3:04
14.	"Hardest Part" (bluegrass version)	Cyrus; Juber	Crossey	2:55
15.	"I Burned LA Down" (choral version)	Cyrus; Harding	Crossey	2:58
16.	"Set for Life"	Jeremy Bose; Trent Dabbs	Bose; Dabbs; Crossey^{[c]}	4:08
Total length:				54:54

=== Notes ===
- ^{^[c]} signifies a co-producer
- ^{^[a]} signifies an additional producer

== Personnel ==
Credits adapted from Tidal.

=== Musicians ===
- Noah Cyrus – lead vocals, background vocals (all tracks); synthesizer (1, 3, 6, 8, 11), percussion (1, 6, 9, 11, 16), piano (1, 11)
- Mike Crossey – programming (1, 2, 4, 5, 7–11, 14, 15), bass guitar (1, 3, 7, 9, 11), percussion (6), keyboards (7), background vocals (15), drums (16)
- Stephen Sesso – banjo (1, 2, 7, 10, 11, 14), acoustic guitar (1, 3, 5, 7, 9–12, 14), electric guitar (3–7, 9, 11, 16), percussion (3, 14), keyboards (4), bass guitar (7, 10, 16), slide guitar (14)
- Drew Taubenfeld – pedal steel guitar (1, 3, 4, 7, 9–11), organ (10)
- Elias Mallin – drums (1, 3, 5–7, 10, 11), percussion (2, 6)
- Jesse Olema – fiddle (1, 5, 9–11, 14)
- Ross Garren – harmonica (1, 5, 10, 11, 14)
- PJ Harding – acoustic guitar (1, 10, 11), background vocals (8–10, 15), piano (8)
- Mookie Singerman – percussion (1, 11)
- Rob Moose – strings (2, 6, 16)
- Tommy English – acoustic guitar, keyboards, piano (2, 6); percussion (2); bass guitar, drums, synthesizer (6)
- Jake Serek – bass guitar (2, 6)
- Jason Evigan – acoustic guitar, background vocals, bass guitar, drums, keyboards (3)
- Lionel Crasta – drums, keyboards, strings (3)
- Mark Schick – drums, electric guitar (3)
- Taylor Johnson – electric guitar, pedal steel guitar (3)
- Benjamin Gibbard – lead vocals, acoustic guitar, background vocals, bass guitar, drums, percussion, piano, programming (4)
- Andy D. Park – keyboards (4)
- CJ Camerieri – horn (5)
- Mike Lewis – saxophone (5)
- LP – background vocals (6)
- Nate Campany – piano (6)
- Nolan Frank – piano (8)
- Chris Bond – drums, percussion (9)
- Billy Ray Cyrus – lead vocals, background vocals (11)
- Trent Dabbs – background vocals, piano (16)

=== Technical ===
- Mike Crossey – mixing
- Randy Merrill – mastering (1–11, 16)
- Eric Lagg – mastering (12–15)
- Stephen Sesso – engineering
- Lionel Crasta – engineering (3)
- Jason Evigan – engineering (3)
- Rafael Fadul – engineering (3)
- Taylor Johnson – engineering (3)
- Andy D. Park – engineering (4)
- Matt Salamone – engineering (6)
- Drew Boals – engineering (11)

== Charts ==
Chart performance for The Hardest Part
Chart (2022)	Peak position
Australian Digital Albums (ARIA)	31
Australian Hitseekers Albums (ARIA)	8
UK Country Albums (Official Charts)	4
UK Album Downloads (Official Charts)	50
UK Americana Albums (Official Charts)	5
US Current Album Sales (Billboard)	92
US Heatseekers Albums (Billboard)	13
