= The End of Everything (EP) =

EP by Noah Cyrus
- Released: May 15, 2020
- Recorded: 2019–2020
- Genre: Pop
- Length: 24:00
- Label: Records; Columbia
- Producer: PJ Harding; Michael Sonier; M-Phazes; Tushar Apte; Jussifer; Loose Change; Triangle Park

Noah Cyrus chronology
Good Cry (2018)	The End of Everything (2020)	People Don't Change (2021)

Singles from The End of Everything
- 1. "July" Released: July 31, 2019; 2. "Lonely" Released: September 27, 2019; 3. "I Got So High That I Saw Jesus" Released: March 20, 2020; 4. "Young & Sad" Released: July 13, 2020

Professional ratings
Review scores
Source	Rating
AllMusic	4.5/5 stars

The End of Everything is the second extended play (EP) by American singer Noah Cyrus. It was released on May 15, 2020, and was preceded by the singles "July", "Lonely", "I Got So High That I Saw Jesus" and "Young & Sad". The EP features a duet with Ant Clemons titled "Wonder Years". The End of Everything is a pop EP influenced by R&B, country, and gospel.

== Singles ==
The first single from the EP was "July". It was released on July 31, 2019 with its music video. The song experienced strong commercial performance, achieving Platinum plaques in the United States, Canada and Australia. On November 8, Cyrus would release a remix of the song with vocals from American singer Leon Bridges. The second single was "Lonely", released on September 27, 2019 and with a music video premiere on October 7, 2019. Its third single was released on March 20, 2020 with a music video, called "I Got So High That I Saw Jesus". "Young & Sad" was released on July 13, 2020 as the fourth and final single.

== Critical reception ==
Neil Z. Yeung of AllMusic praised the EP, saying it "offers a vulnerable peek into the singer/songwriter's mental and emotional struggles through heartfelt and simple offerings."

== Tour ==
On January 8, 2020, Cyrus announced The Not So Tour, Tour, a 3-date-long limited concert tour with one show in London, and two in the United States. The tour started on February 11, and ended on March 11.

Date	City	Country	Venue
Europe
February 11, 2020	London	England	O2 Academy Islington
North America
March 4, 2020	New York City	United States	Bowery Ballroom
March 11, 2020	Los Angeles	United States	The Roxy

== Track listing ==
The End of Everything track listing
No.	Title	Writer(s)	Producer(s)	Length
1.	"Ghost"	Brian Lee; Jaramye Daniels; Jussi Karvinen; Tushar Apte; Winona Oak	Tushar Apte; Jussifer	3:05
2.	"I Got So High That I Saw Jesus"	Noah Cyrus; PJ Harding	Harding; M-Phazes	3:38
3.	"Liar"	Andrea Rosario; Dan Henig; Hanni Ibrahim; Cyrus; Patrick Patrikios	Loose Change	2:53
4.	"Lonely"	Cyrus; Roland "Rollo" Spreckley	Rollo; Dan Gleyzer	2:24
5.	"Young & Sad"	Cyrus; Harding; Rollo	Harding; M-Phazes	3:10
6.	"July"	Michael Sonier; Cyrus; Harding	Sonier	2:36
7.	"Wonder Years" (with Ant Clemons)	John Lennon; Paul McCartney	Triangle Park	3:18
8.	"The End of Everything"	Cyrus; Harding	Harding; M-Phazes	2:56
Total length:				24:00

== Charts ==
Chart performance for The End of Everything
Chart (2020)	Peak position
Australian Albums (ARIA)	64
Canadian Albums (Billboard)	45
Norwegian Albums (VG-lista)	20
UK Album Downloads (OCC)	88
US Billboard 200	124
US Heatseekers Albums (Billboard)	1

== Certifications ==
Certifications for The End of Everything
Region	Certification	Certified units/sales
Canada (Music Canada)	Platinum	80,000^{‡}
United States (RIAA)	Gold	500,000^{‡}
^{‡} Sales+streaming figures based on certification alone.
