= Cyrus vs. Cyrus: Design and Conquer =

American reality television series

- Genre: Reality
- Starring: Tish Cyrus; Brandi Cyrus
- Country of origin: United States
- Original language: English
- No. of seasons: 1
- No. of episodes: 6

Production
- Executive producers: Steve Michaels; Jonathan Koch; Tish Cyrus
- Running time: 24 minutes
- Production companies: Asylum Entertainment; Hope Town Entertainment

Original release
- Network: Bravo
- Release: May 25 – June 29, 2017

Cyrus vs. Cyrus: Design and Conquer is an American reality television series that premiered on May 25, 2017, on Bravo. Announced in October 2016, the half-hour show features Tish and Brandi Cyrus, a mother-daughter duo, working together on various interior design projects.

== Episodes ==
No.	Title	Original release date	US viewers (millions)
1	"Elegant and Kid Friendly"	May 25, 2017	0.49
Tish and Brandi take on their first clients. They face the challenge of redesigning their living room and bathroom to be kid friendly and luxurious. The clients choose Tish's design, along with features from Brandi's design.
2	"Creating a Forever Home"	June 1, 2017	0.35
The duo need to create a forever home for a military family by redesigning their living room, kitchen and den. Billy Ray Cyrus guest stars.
3	"Foyer, No It's FoYea!"	June 8, 2017	0.35
Brandi and Tish are hired to finish current construction to the dining room, living room and foyer of a single mom and her son. Tish surprises them with Miley Cyrus's old cheer squad.
4	"Battle of the Styles"	June 15, 2017	0.46
Tish and Brandi are challenged to mix the design styles of Native American and Hollywood Glam for their clients, one of Nashville’s top music execs and his wife.
5	"Young Love"	June 22, 2017	0.33
The two have to deal with their biggest project yet; a young couple who wants to expand their family needs a unique duplex layout transformed back into a single family home.
6	"Family Is Everything"	June 29, 2017	0.46
Each of the Cyrus clan has a place to call home in Nashville, except for Miley Cyrus. Hoping to entice Miley to come visit more, Billy Ray challenges Tish and Brandi to convert their old barn into a surprise for Miley, and make it a home in Nashville she can call her own. Miley Cyrus guest stars.
