= Emily Grace Reaves =

American former actress and model

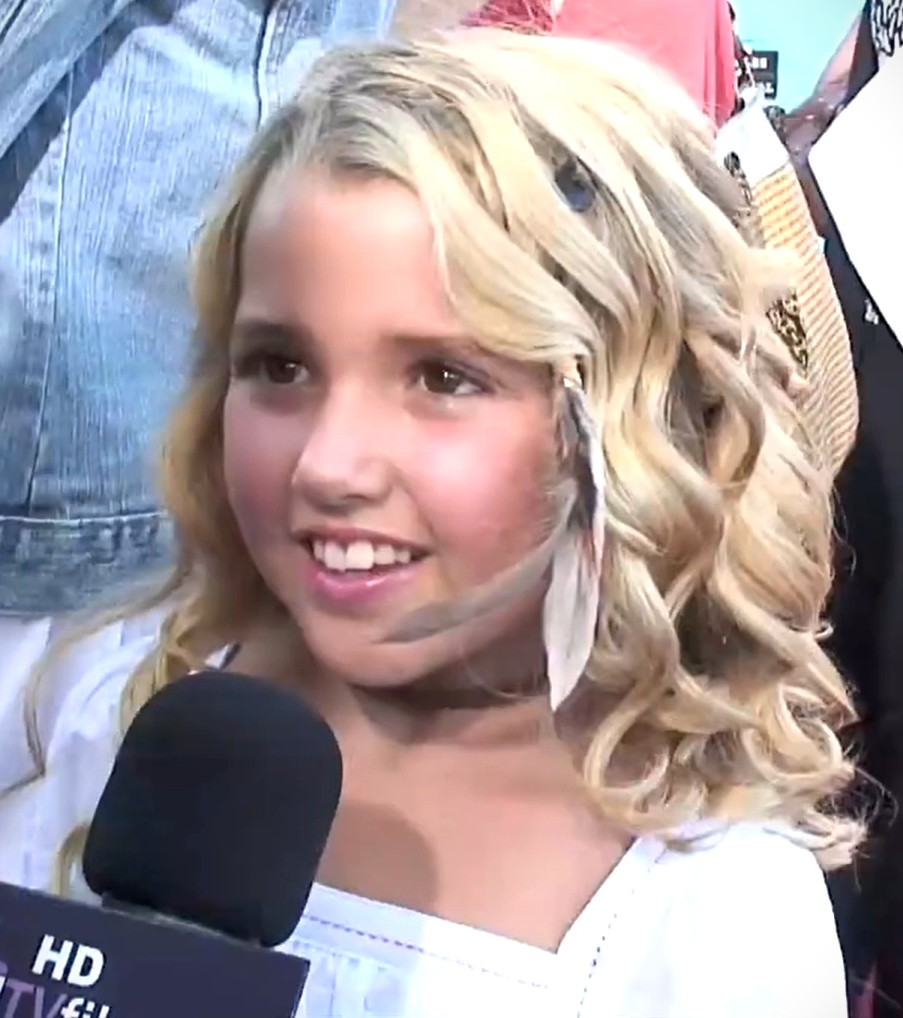
- Reaves in 2009
- Other name: Emily Reaves
- Occupation: Actress
- Years active: 2008–2013

Emily Grace Reaves is an American former actress and model.

== Life and career ==
Reaves' acting career began when she first appeared in a 2008 episode of ER. She may be best recognized as Cindy Lou in Hannah Montana: The Movie. In addition to acting as a child, she used to be involved in both fashion design and modeling. In 2010, Reaves and her childhood best friend Noah Cyrus, who was also her co-star in Mostly Ghostly: Who Let the Ghosts Out?, promoted a high-end clothing line for children and teenagers called the Emily Grace Collection. She and Noah also created their own web show, known as The Noie and Ems Show, that ran between 2009 and 2010. She and Noah also went on tour with Noah's sister Miley in 2009 filming their web show while touring through the United States. She starred in a short film called Melissa with fellow child actress Sophie Texeira, where she portrays an 8-year-old girl who dies suddenly of cancer. She also created a foundation to help raise money for St. Jude Children's Research Hospital, called The Lollipops & Rainbows Foundation, which was launched on May 2, 2009.

Although she is retired from acting, she is active on Instagram, where she and Noah Cyrus still continue to follow each other and keep in contact; despite the fact that the two are seemingly no longer close.

== Fashion career ==
Emily Grace Reaves had a collection of poufy dresses from child brand Ooh, La La! Couture. The brand consisted with pettiskirt dresses and tank/skirt sets. In 2010, she launched another clothing line with Three Peas Co. The line included pettiskirts, jackets, dresses, and petti-dresses. In 2011, Reaves revealed that she had another clothing line co designed by her mom, Edi, that would launch in Spring, 2012 called Rockabilly Dollz by Edi and Ems. The clothing line contained southern-rock style shirts, skirts, leggings, and dresses. In an interview with Reaves in June 2012, she said that Rockabilly Dollz was "...still in the manufacturing business." As of March 2013, Emily Grace Reaves has not launched the much-anticipated Rockabilly Dollz clothing line.

== Filmography ==
Year	Title	Role	Notes
2008	ER	Delilah Voltaire	1 episode
2008	Mostly Ghostly: Who Let the Ghosts Out?	Trick or treater	Credited as Emily Reaves
2009	Hannah Montana: The Movie	Cindy Lou	
2010	Melissa	Melissa	Short film
2010	Soulstice	Skyla	Supporting Role
