= Stay Together (Noah Cyrus song) =

Single by Noah Cyrus
- Released: April 14, 2017
- Recorded: November 2016
- Length: 3:12
- Label: RECORDS
- Songwriter(s): Noah Cyrus; Nicholas Gale; Emily Warren; Britt Burton
- Producer(s): Digital Farm Animals; Hudson Mohawke; Jenna Andrews (voc.); Chris "Tek" O'Ryan (voc.)

Noah Cyrus singles chronology
"Chasing Colors" (2017)	"Stay Together" (2017)	"Again" (2017)

Music video
- "Stay Together" on YouTube

"Stay Together" is a song by American actress and singer Noah Cyrus. It was released on April 14, 2017. The song was written by Cyrus, Emily Warren, and Britt Burton, with production being handled by Digital Farm Animals and Hudson Mohawke.

== Critical reception ==
Idolator's Mike Wass called it "rowdy, relatable and very catchy" as well as a "raucous, rebellious anthem with a massive sing-along chorus" and a "perfect snapshot of teen restlessness and carpe-diem spirit." Tom Breihan of Stereogum compared "Stay Together" to the works of Miley Cyrus and dubbed it Noah's "own attempt at a no-fucks anthem." Entertainment Weekly's Nolan Feeney labeled it a "laid-back, slightly melancholy YOLO anthem." Gabe Bergado of Teen Vogue said "it's totally a song that you'd listen to while dealing with all the feelings after a breakup."

== Track listing ==
Digital download
No.	Title	Length
1.	"Stay Together"	3:12

Digital download – Hit-Boy Remix
No.	Title	Length
1.	"Stay Together" (Hit-Boy Remix)	3:31

== Charts ==
Chart (2017)	Peak position
Canada CHR/Top 40 (Billboard)	48
Israel (Media Forest TV Airplay)	1
New Zealand Heatseekers (Recorded Music NZ)	5
Scotland (Official Charts Company)	58
UK Download (Official Charts Company)	87
US Pop Airplay (Billboard)	38

== Certifications ==
Region	Certification	Certified units/sales
Australia (ARIA)	Gold	35,000^{‡}
Canada (Music Canada)	Gold	40,000^{‡}
United States (RIAA)	Gold	500,000^{‡}
^{‡} Sales+streaming figures based on certification alone.

== Release history ==
Region	Date	Format	Label	Ref.
Various	April 14, 2017	Digital download	RECORDS	
United States	April 25, 2017	Top 40 radio	RECORDS	
United States	May 5, 2017	Digital download – Hit-Boy Remix	RECORDS	
