= Brandi Cyrus =

American actress and DJ (born 1987)

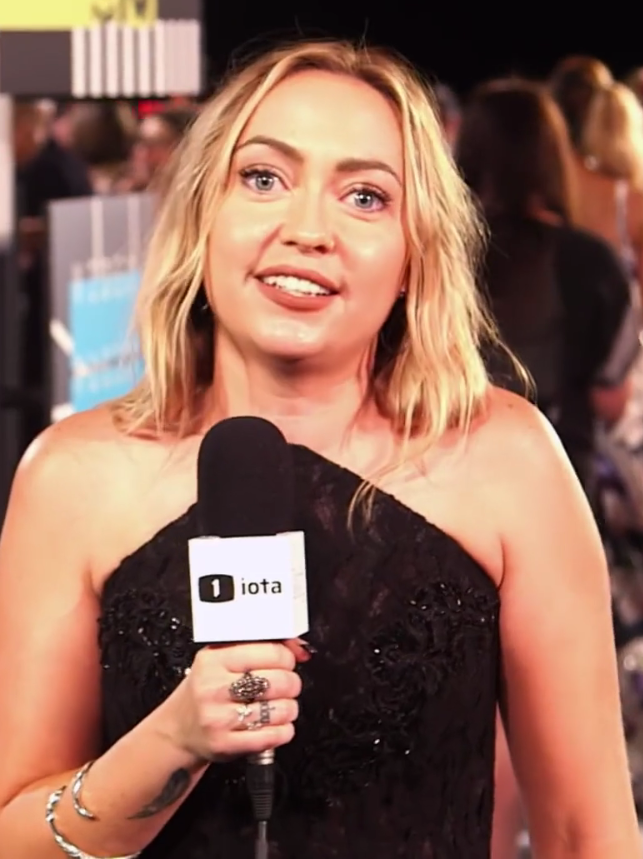
- Cyrus hosting at 2015 MTV Video Music Awards Red Carpet
- Born: Brandi Glenn Helson; May 26, 1987 (age 39); Nashville, Tennessee, US
- Other name: Brandi Glenn Cyrus
- Occupations: Actress; DJ; TV host
- Years active: 2007–present
- Parent(s): Billy Ray Cyrus (father); Tish Cyrus (mother)
- Relatives: Ron Cyrus (grandfather); Miley Cyrus (sister); Trace Cyrus (brother); Noah Cyrus (sister); Joseph Purcell (stepbrother)

Brandi Glenn Cyrus (née Helson; born May 26, 1987) is an American actress and DJ. She was the co-host Cyrus vs. Cyrus: Design and Conquer on Bravo and is a co-host of the Your Favorite Thing podcast.

Out of six siblings, as she has three brothers and two sisters, Cyrus is the first and eldest daughter of country singer Billy Ray Cyrus.

As of December 2025, Brandi is engaged to Matt Southcombe, an Australian motorcycle enthusiast who is a father of one to a 13 year old son named Cohen Southcombe.

== Early years ==
Cyrus was born on May 26, 1987 in Nashville, Tennessee as Brandi Glenn Helson. Her mother is Leticia "Tish" Cyrus. Her biological father is Baxter Neal Helson. She was adopted at age six by Billy Ray Cyrus, her mother's second husband, following their marriage. Her siblings include brothers Trace and Braison and sisters Miley and Noah Cyrus.

== Career ==
Cyrus has DJed residency shows in Las Vegas, including at Wynn Las Vegas. In May and June 2025, she will DJ as the opening act for country musician Kenny Chesney's residency at the Sphere.

She co-hosts a podcast with her mother, Leticia "Tish" Cyrus, called Sorry We're Cyrus. As of January 2024, they have produced four seasons of the podcast.

== Filmography ==
- 2007: Hannah Montana: Live in London
- 2007: Billy Ray Cyrus: Home at Last
- 2008: Zoey 101
- 2008-2011: Hannah Montana
- 2009: Hannah Montana: The Movie
- 2011: What's Up
- 2013: Piers Morgan Tonight
- 2013: Truly Tish
- 2014: Brandiville
- 2014: MTV Video Music Awards
- 2015: Old 37
- 2015: Celebrity P.O.V.
- 2015: The Queue
- 2016: Entertainment Tonight
- 2016: Access Hollywood
- 2017: Cyrus vs. Cyrus: Design and Conquer
