= Again (Noah Cyrus song) =

Single by Noah Cyrus featuring XXXTentacion
- Released: September 22, 2017
- Length: 3:14
- Label: RECORDS; Syco
- Songwriters: Timothy McKenzie; Noah Cyrus; Jahseh Onfroy
- Producer: Labrinth

Noah Cyrus singles chronology
"Stay Together" (2017)	"Again" (2017)	"All Falls Down" (2017)

XXXTentacion singles chronology
"Roll in Peace" (2017)	"Again" (2017)	"Fuck Love" (2018)

Music video
- "Again" on YouTube

"Again" is a song by American singer and actress Noah Cyrus featuring fellow American singer and rapper XXXTentacion. Written alongside producer Labrinth, it was released on September 22, 2017.

== Music video ==
The music video was released on the same day of the single's release; it has over 134 million views as of June 2024. XXXTentacion does not appear in the song's music video, as he was incarcerated at the time of its filming. It was filmed in Waverley Cemetery on top of the cliffs at Bronte in the eastern suburbs of Sydney, Australia.

== Critical reception ==
Tatiana Cirisano from Billboard states that "The fiery new track, which arrived along with a music video today (September 22), layers Cyrus' soulful, breathy vocal in the vein of Florence and the Machine's Florence Welch over drum kicks and industrial, metallic production. Meanwhile, XXXTentacion slides in for a slurred, slow-burning verse about being 'somewhere in between in love and broken.' The music video is similarly dark, with Cyrus looming about a graveyard."

== Charts ==
Chart (2017)	Peak position
Canada Hot 100 (Billboard)	91
Czech Republic Singles Digital (ČNS IFPI)	91
New Zealand Heatseekers (RMNZ)	6
Slovakia Singles Digital (ČNS IFPI)	85
US Bubbling Under Hot 100 (Billboard)	7

== Certifications ==
Region	Certification	Certified units/sales
Canada (Music Canada)	Gold	40,000^{‡}
France (SNEP)	Gold	100,000^{‡}
Mexico (AMPROFON)	3× Platinum	180,000^{‡}
New Zealand (RMNZ)	Platinum	30,000^{‡}
Poland (ZPAV)	Platinum	50,000^{‡}
United Kingdom (BPI)	Gold	400,000^{‡}
United States (RIAA)	Platinum	1,000,000^{‡}
^{‡} Sales+streaming figures based on certification alone.

== Release history ==
Region	Date	Format	Label	Ref.
United States	September 22, 2017	Digital download	RECORDS; Syco	
France	September 22, 2017	CD	Sony Music	
