= Good Cry =

EP by Noah Cyrus
- Released: September 21, 2018
- Length: 22:45
- Label: Records; Columbia
- Producer: Noah Cyrus; Jenna Andrews; Tushar Apte; Illangelo; Joe Janiak; Kid Harpoon; Doc McKinney

Noah Cyrus chronology
Good Cry (2018)	The End of Everything (2020)

Singles from Good Cry
- 1. "Mad at You" Released: September 7, 2018

Good Cry is the debut extended play (EP) by American singer Noah Cyrus. It was released on September 21, 2018, and was preceded by the single "Mad at You", a collaboration with Gallant.

== Singles ==
The first single from the EP, is "Mad At You" featuring the singer Gallant. The music video was released on November 12, 2018.

== Critical reception ==
Good Cry was listed as the 19th best EP of 2018 by Idolator, with Mike Wass saying "The rising star's Good Cry EP showcases her soulful vocals and proves that she's capable of producing a cohesive collection of tracks."

== Tour ==
The Good Cry Tour

On September 22, 2018, Cyrus embarked on The Good Cry Tour. The first show took place at the Revolution Live in Fort Lauderdale. The tour ended on October 24 at the Wonder Ballroom in Portland.

Date	City	Country	Venue	Attendance	Revenue
North America
September 22, 2018	Fort Lauderdale	United States	Revolution Live	—	—
September 23, 2018	Orlando	United States	The Beacham	—	—
September 25, 2018	Atlanta	United States	The Loft	—	—
September 26, 2018	Nashville	United States	Cannery Ballroom	—	—
September 28, 2018	Baltimore	United States	Baltimore Soundstage	—	—
September 29, 2018	West Springfield	United States	—	—	—
October 1, 2018	New York City	United States	Irving Plaza	—	—
October 3, 2018	Philadelphia	United States	Theatre of Living Arts	—	—
October 5, 2018	Detroit	United States	Saint Andrews Hall	—	—
October 7, 2018	Chicago	United States	House of Blues Chicago	—	—
October 8, 2018	Minneapolis	United States	Varsity Theater	—	—
October 10, 2018	Dallas	United States	Granada Theater	—	—
October 11, 2018	Houston	United States	House of Blues Houston	—	—
October 13, 2018	Denver	United States	The Summit Music Hall	—	—
October 16, 2018	Los Angeles	United States	Belasco Theatre	—	—
October 18, 2018	San Diego	United States	House of Blues San Diego	—	—
October 20, 2018	San Francisco	United States	August Hall	—	—
October 22, 2018	Seattle	United States	Neptune Theatre	—	—
October 23, 2018	Vancouver	Canada	Commodore Ballroom	—	—
October 24, 2018	Portland	United States	Wonder Ballroom	—	—
Total				/	$

== Track listing ==
No.	Title	Writer(s)	Producer(s)	Length
1.	"Where Have You Been?"	Noah Cyrus; Doc McKinney; Carlo Montagnese	McKinney; Illangelo	2:39
2.	"Mad at You" (with Gallant)	Cyrus; Thomas Hull; Sarah Aarons	Kid Harpoon; Jenna Andrews	3:46
3.	"Good Cry"	Cyrus; Melisa Bester; Tushar Apte	Apte	4:18
4.	"Punches" (with LP)	Cyrus; Janiak; Andrews	Joe Janiak	4:13
5.	"Sadness"	Cyrus; Cleo Tighe; Jerker Hansson; Andrews	Rob Grimaldi; Andrews	3:42
6.	"Topanga" (voice memo)	Cyrus; Ilsey Juber	Juber	4:07
Total length:				22:45

== Charts ==
Chart (2018)	Peak position
US Heatseekers Albums (Billboard)	13
