= Lighthouse (Ookay and Fox Stevenson song) =

Single by Ookay and Fox Stevenson

from the album Monstercat Uncaged Vol. 3
- Released: 1 September 2017
- Recorded: 2017
- Genre: Future bass
- Length: 3:28
- Label: Monstercat
- Songwriter(s): Abraham Laguna; Stanley Stevenson Byrne

Ookay singles chronology
"Chasing Colors" (2017)	"Lighthouse" (2017)	"Cool" (2018)

Fox Stevenson singles chronology
"Arigatou" (2017)	"Lighthouse" (2017)	"Bulgogi" (2018)

Lighthouse is a collaborative future bass song by American electronic music producer Ookay and English drum and bass producer Fox Stevenson. Lighthouse was released on September 1, 2017, by the independent electronic music label, Monstercat.

== Background and composition ==
On April 10, 2017, Ookay officially announced Lighthouse, a collaboration between himself and British electronic artist Fox Stevenson.

In an interview with Miguel Tost of YourEDM, Stevenson commented on the production process of Lighthouse, stating:

Back in January, I was on a mini tour here in the US and had some time off in LA. So I was just making stuff at a studio. Then a sketch that later became Lighthouse came into being, like most tracks do. It just kinda suddenly suggested itself.A few nights before, I had played at Space Yacht in LA and Abe and I had finally met in person and played back-to-back. So I texted him the track and the next day he came over with some vocals that really weren’t far off what it is now. We pushed through the instrumental together, and over the course of a couple hours and one taco run later, the tracks was basically done! The rest was just tightening up everything, and that took a WHILE [laughs].

Lighthouse features both producers vocals throughout the song. In an interview with Miguel Tost of YourEDM, Stevenson stated "We went back and forth on a few different ways to do the vocals. We ended up opting for a mixture of the two of our voices in such a way that you can’t tell who it is that it can be either. To be honest, though, the process of actually writing and making the final vocal sound wasn’t any different to how things usually are".

== Reception and release ==
Lighthouse was noted for its blend of both producers respective styles with Aric Manthey of EDM.com stating "Not all collaborations feel like 50/50 partnerships but in the case of Lighthouse, this collaboration feels like a fair blend of influences from both producers" and Chad Downs of Dancing Astronaut stating "Ookay brings his genre-bending strength to the table in this single, working with Stevenson to create something entirely unique".

Erik of EDM Sauce criticised the song for its repetitiveness, stating "Lighthouse can seem a bit repetitive at some points, which is really the only thing that is holding this tune back from a higher rating. Overall though, this song is fun and well put together". Lauren Ikenn of This Song Slaps praised the song, stating "Lighthouse is truly a masterpiece and we hope it’s the first of many collaborations between these talented artists". Iuliana Prichea of EDM Nations stated: "Featuring both Ookay and Fox Stevenson’s vocals, this future bass tune exhibits not only the unfiltered energy both musicians bring to their work but the sheer depth of emotion they provide in this roller coaster ride of a record".

== Charts ==
Chart (2017)	Peak position
US Dance/Mix Show Airplay (Billboard)	35
