= Make Me (Cry) =

Single by Noah Cyrus featuring Labrinth
- Released: November 15, 2016
- Recorded: September 2016
- Genre: Electro
- Length: 4:02
- Label: RECORDS; Syco (UK)
- Songwriters: Noah Cyrus; Timothy McKenzie
- Producer: Labrinth

Noah Cyrus singles chronology
"Ponyo On the Cliff By the Sea" (2010)	"Make Me (Cry)" (2016)	"Chasing Colors" (2017)

Labrinth singles chronology
"Higher" (2015)	"Make Me (Cry)" (2016)	"To Be Human" (2017)

Music video
- "Make Me (Cry)" on YouTube

"Make Me (Cry)" is the debut single recorded by American actress and singer Noah Cyrus. It features vocals from English producer, singer and songwriter Labrinth, and it was released on November 15, 2016. The song was written by Cyrus and Labrinth, with the production handled by the latter.

== Background ==
In an interview with V, Cyrus said about the song: "It was really conversational. Lab[rinth] had a chorus, and then we started just going back and forth writing lyrics together. It turned into being about a toxic love and that's when I was like, 'Lab, there's no way I'm doing this without you.' It was so organic, and I think that shows in the video because it's very real. I think it's cool because they're asleep the whole time and you're trying to get into this person and they're just not listening to you. The video really explains the song."

== Critical reception ==
Teen Vogue's De Elizabeth dubbed it a "gut-wrenching power-ballad that will resonate with anyone who has suffered a broken heart" and went on to say that "the song seems to reinforce the idea that sometimes you can be lonely even when you're in a relationship, and that being with someone can sometimes create more pain than being alone." Deepa Lakshmin of MTV claimed Noah's vocals "sound awfully similar to Miley's circa 2008. [Make Me (Cry)] is a song about love that's anything but easy," as well as calling it an "emotional duet" and "the perfect breakup song." E! Online's Kendall Fisher said the song is "way more different than most artist's first, pop inspired hit—including Miley's—as it follows a slower beat with a theme relating to toxic love and heartbreak." Ian David Monroe of V stated "while Cyrus may be young, the track itself feels anything but, with emotionally mature lyrics and an entirely adult sound. It is an impressive start for an artist with plenty of potentials, and lays the groundwork for a career to launch in any direction she chooses. With powerhouse vocals and a strong vision (attributes that seem to run in the family), Noah Cyrus may just have the music world at her fingertips."

== Music video ==
A music video for the song, directed by Sophie Muller was released on November 22, 2016. De Elizabeth of Teen Vogue described the music video: "The video depicts the two singers waking up in their respective beds with their partners who are seemingly disinterested in their affection. In alternating shots, we see Noah's sadness, and then Labrinth's, and back again, as they sing about their significant others. As the song reaches its climax, the video goes into a split-screen so we can see Noah and Labrinth at the same time – and their raging around the apartment will give you major 'Wrecking Ball' vibes. The video ends in silence as Noah and Labrinth walk across their apartments, sitting down wordlessly."

As of February 2026, the music video on YouTube has amassed over 167 million views since its release on November 22, 2016.

== Track listing ==
Digital download
No.	Title	Length
1.	"Make Me (Cry)" (featuring Labrinth)	4:02

Digital download – Acoustic Version
No.	Title	Length
1.	"Make Me (Cry)" (featuring Labrinth) (Acoustic Version)	3:52

Digital download – Marshmello Remix
No.	Title	Length
1.	"Make Me (Cry)" (featuring Labrinth) (Marshmello Remix)	3:24

== Charts ==
Chart (2016–17)	Peak position
Australia (ARIA)	67
Australia Hitseekers (ARIA)	1
Belgium (Ultratip Bubbling Under Flanders)	20
Belgium (Ultratip Bubbling Under Wallonia)	33
Canada Hot 100 (Billboard)	46
Czech Republic Singles Digital (ČNS IFPI)	60
Denmark (Tracklisten)	39
Ireland (IRMA)	51
Netherlands (Single Top 100)	65
New Zealand Heatseekers (RMNZ)	5
Norway (VG-lista)	6
Scottish Singles Sales (Official Charts)	73
Slovakia Singles Digital (ČNS IFPI)	66
Sweden (Sverigetopplistan)	20
UK Singles (Official Charts)	88
US Billboard Hot 100	46
US Dance Airplay (Billboard)	40
US Pop Airplay (Billboard)	22

== Certifications ==
Region	Certification	Certified units/sales
Australia (ARIA)	Platinum	70,000^{‡}
Canada (Music Canada)	Platinum	80,000^{‡}
Denmark (IFPI Danmark)	Gold	45,000^{‡}
Mexico (AMPROFON)	Gold	30,000^{‡}
New Zealand (RMNZ)	Platinum	30,000^{‡}
Sweden (GLF)	Platinum	40,000^{‡}
United Kingdom (BPI)	Silver	200,000^{‡}
United States (RIAA)	2× Platinum	2,000,000^{‡}
^{‡} Sales+streaming figures based on certification alone.

== Release history ==
Region	Date	Format	Label	Ref.
Various	November 15, 2016	Digital download	RECORDS	
United States	January 10, 2017	Top 40 radio	RECORDS	
United States	February 6, 2017	Hot adult contemporary radio	RECORDS	
United States	April 22, 2017	Vinyl	RECORDS	
United States	December 13, 2016	Digital download – Acoustic Version	RECORDS	
United States	February 17, 2017	Digital download – Marshmello Remix	RECORDS	
