= People Don't Change =

EP by PJ Harding and Noah Cyrus
- Released: April 23, 2021
- Recorded: 2020–2021
- Length: 16:55
- Label: Records; RCA
- Producer: PJ Harding

Noah Cyrus chronology
| The End of Everything (2020) | People Don't Change (2021) | The Hardest Part (2022) |

Singles from People Don't Change
- 1. "Dear August" Released: February 12, 2021; 2. "You Belong to Somebody Else" Released: March 19, 2021

Professional ratings
Review scores
| Source | Rating |
|---|---|
| NME | 4/5 stars |

People Don't Change is a collaborative extended play (EP) by Australian singer-songwriter PJ Harding and American singer Noah Cyrus. The EP was released on April 23, 2021, by Records, LLC and RCA Records, making it her first release on the later label. It was preceded by the singles "Dear August" and "You Belong to Somebody Else". The duo originally met at a songwriting camp in Bali, and eventually teamed up in 2019 to write songs for Cyrus's second EP The End of Everything

== Singles ==
The first single from the EP was "Dear August". It was released on February 12, 2021, with its music video. The second single was "You Belong to Somebody Else", released on March 19, 2021 and with a lyric video premiere on April 7, 2021.

== Critical reception ==
Rhian Daly of NME called the EP "Understated and gentle" and "a gorgeous leap forward in the youngest Cyrus’ ever-evolving story."

== Track listing ==
All tracks written and produced by Peter James Harding and Noah Cyrus, with additional songwriting from Victoria Zaro on "The Worst of You".

| No. | Title | Length |
|---|---|---|
| 1. | "Dear August" | 3:20 |
| 2. | "You Belong to Somebody Else" | 3:19 |
| 3. | "Cannonball" | 2:32 |
| 4. | "The Best of You" | 1:11 |
| 5. | "Slow Train Comin'" | 3:01 |
| 6. | "The Worst of You" | 3:29 |
| Total length: | | 16:55 |

== Personnel ==
Credits adapted from Tidal.

- PJ Harding – vocals, production (all tracks); guitar (tracks 1, 4–6), piano (3); drums, programming (5, 6)
- Noah Cyrus – vocals
- Rich Costey – mixing
- Randy Merrill – mastering
- Keith Parry – engineering
- Adrian Breakspear – engineering (1)
- Mike McCarthy – mandolin (1, 6), guitar (1), banjo (6)
