= Tish Cyrus =

American actress and producer (born 1967)

- Born: Leticia Jean Finley; May 15, 1967 (age 59)
- Occupations: Manager; producer
- Years active: 2001–present
- Spouses: Billy Ray Cyrus (m. 1993; div. 2023) Dominic Purcell (m. 2023)
- Children: 5, including Brandi, Trace, Miley and Noah Cyrus

External image
- Cyrus in 2017.

Tish Cyrus-Purcell (née Leticia Jean Finley; born May 15, 1967) is an American manager and producer. She has managed her two daughters, Miley and Noah Cyrus, since the beginning of their careers, and still manages them along with Jonathan Daniel from Crush Music. Cyrus is the owner and current president of Hopetown Entertainment, a privately owned television and film production company.

== Career ==
Cyrus has produced films starring her daughter Miley Cyrus. She was the executive producer of The Last Song, based on the novel by Nicholas Sparks. She starred in the TV show Cyrus vs. Cyrus: Design and Conquer, which launched on May 25, 2017.

== Personal life ==
On May 26, 1987, Finley, then aged 20, gave birth to a daughter, Brandi Glenn Cyrus. On February 24, 1989, Finley, then aged 21, gave birth to a son, Trace Dempsey Cyrus (born Neil Timothy Helson), whose father is Baxter Neal Helson. Finley and Helson separated at some point and on May 22, 1992, the Circuit Court of Boyd County Kentucky granted primary custody of Trace to his mother. During a custody battle in 1998, court documents revealed that Trace did not want to visit his father because his father would make derogatory comments about Tish and her family in his presence, would force Trace to cut his hair and would call him by his birth name rather than "Trace". It was also revealed that for a couple of years, Brandi and Trace were living with and being raised by their grandmother Loretta Finley, in a house close to Tish's home.

On November 23, 1992, Tish, then aged 25, gave birth to her third child, Miley Ray Cyrus (born Destiny Hope Cyrus), whose father is Billy Ray Cyrus. On December 28, 1993, Billy Ray Cyrus and Tish Cyrus were legally married and Billy Ray legally adopted Tish's children from her previous relationships. They were married at his home in Williamson County, Tennessee. Dressed for the ceremony in blue jeans and a cut-up sweatshirt, Cyrus, in a quote from his father Ron Cyrus, said "One cannot stand at the crossroads forever." However, there are some reports that they were married at Graceland Wedding Chapel in Las Vegas. In a 2013 ABC News article, Tish said "1992 was one of the hardest years of my life just because of that change. He was playing to 50, 60, 100,000 people, you know? And there was just women everywhere". She had been with Cyrus before he became famous. She appears in the "Achy Breaky" video. She also talks about Billy Ray Cyrus informing her that another woman was pregnant with his baby at the same time as her.

She gained one stepson, Christopher Cody, who is Billy Ray's biological son from his short-lived romance with Kristen/Kristin Luckey while she worked as a waitress in a South Carolina restaurant. Christopher was born April 8, 1992 and grew up with his mother in Fort Worth, Texas. Cody has said in the press that Billy Ray supported him financially, but he was not close with the Cyrus family.

She had her fourth child, Braison Chance Cyrus, in 1994. In 2000, she gave birth to her fifth child, Noah Lindsey Cyrus.

The family lived on a 500-acre (2.0 km^{2}) farm in Thompson's Station, outside of Nashville, Tennessee, before moving to Los Angeles for the filming of the Disney Channel original children's sitcom Hannah Montana. They lived in a house created by Montecito architect Bob Easton in Toluca Lake.

In September 2010 Leticia Finley Cyrus filed court documents requesting her name be legally changed to Tish Finley Cyrus, saying that she has been known as Tish "for as long as she can remember."

On October 26, 2010, Billy Ray Cyrus filed for divorce from Tish in Tennessee, citing irreconcilable differences. In a statement made to People the next day announcing the split, Billy Ray and Tish said, "As you can imagine, this is a very difficult time for our family... We are trying to work through some personal matters. We appreciate your thoughts and prayers." However, on March 18, 2011, Billy Ray announced on The View that he had dropped the divorce.

On June 13, 2013, Tish filed for divorce from Billy Ray after 19 years of marriage, citing irreconcilable differences. However, it was reported in July 2013 that they had gone to couples therapy and rekindled their relationship.

In July 2021, Cyrus became a grandmother when her son Braison and daughter-in-law Stella McBride Cyrus had a child.

In April 2022, Tish Cyrus filed for divorce a second time, with the divorce papers revealing that the couple had been separated for more than two years.

In November 2022, Cyrus confirmed her relationship with Prison Break actor Dominic Purcell. They publicly announced their engagement via a post on Instagram in April 2023. They married in August 2023 in Malibu, California. This also made her stepmother to vertical drama actor Joseph Purcell.

=== Cannabis advocacy ===
Cyrus reintroduced her daughter, Miley, to cannabis after quitting upon the release of the album Younger Now. During an interview with Andy Cohen, Miley stated that her mother joked about quitting as her manager in order to start a cannabis company.

== Filmography ==
Film
Year	Title	Role	Notes
2008	Hannah Montana & Miley Cyrus: Best of Both Worlds Concert	Herself	Uncredited

Television
Year	Title	Role	Notes
2001	Doc	Herself (uncredited)	Episode: Pilot Part 1
2007	Billy Ray Cyrus: Home at Last	Herself	Unknown episodes
2010	Miley Cyrus: Live at the O2	Herself (uncredited)	Television film
2013	Miley: The Movement	Herself	Television film
2013	American Music Awards	Herself - Audience Member (uncredited)	Television special
2013–14	Truly Tish	Herself	6 episodes
2015	Cancer, it's in the System	Herself	Television film
2015	2015 MTV Video Music Awards with People Magazine	Herself	1 episode
2016	Access Hollywood	Herself	2 episodes
2017	The Talk	Herself	1 episode
2017	Today	Herself	1 episode
2017	Entertainment Tonight	Herself	1 episode
2017	Cyrus vs. Cyrus: Design and Conquer	Herself	Co-host
2017	The Insider	Herself	2 episodes
2026	Hannah Montana 20th Anniversary Special	Herself	Television special; also executive producer

Producer
Year	Title	Notes
2010	The Last Song	Executive producer
2010	Miley Cyrus: Live at the O2	Executive producer
2012	LOL	Producer
2012	So Undercover	Producer
2014	Sunday Sessions	Executive producer (4 episodes)
2013–14	Truly Tish	Executive producer (6 episodes)
2013–14	Brandiville	Executive producer (6 episodes)
2014	Take 2	Executive producer (5 episodes)
2014	Miley Cyrus: Bangerz Tour	Executive producer
