= July (Noah Cyrus song) =

2019 single by Noah Cyrus

Single by Noah Cyrus

from the EP The End of Everything
- Released: July 31, 2019
- Length: 2:36
- Label: Records; Columbia
- Songwriters: Noah Cyrus; PJ Harding; Michael Sonier; Jenna Andrews (Duet Version)
- Producer: Michael Sonier

Noah Cyrus singles chronology
"Expensive" (2019)	"July" (2019)	"Lonely" (2019)

Music video
- "July" on YouTube

"July" is a song by American singer Noah Cyrus, released as the lead single from her second EP The End of Everything through Records and Columbia Records on July 31, 2019. A duet version with American soul singer Leon Bridges was released on November 8, 2019, after which the song became Cyrus' second and Bridges' first entry on the US Billboard Hot 100, peaking at number 85.

== Composition ==
The song features harmonies and "contemplative lyrics" over "simple acoustic instrumentation".

== Critical reception ==
Writing for Billboard, Ellise Shafer called it "reflective" and a "folk-infused ballad" about "the continuous cycle of a toxic relationship".

== Music video ==
The music video was directed by James Pereira, Raymond Jafelice, and Andrew Young and released on July 31, the same day as the song.

== Charts ==
=== Weekly charts ===
Chart (2019–2020)	Peak position
Australia (ARIA)	40
Belgium (Ultratip Bubbling Under Flanders)	13
Canada Hot 100 (Billboard)	40
France (SNEP Sales Chart)	82
Ireland (IRMA)	24
Netherlands (Single Tip)	7
New Zealand Hot Singles (RMNZ)	8
Norway (VG-lista)	30
Portugal (AFP)	183
Scotland Singles (OCC)	99
Sweden (Sverigetopplistan)	78
Switzerland (Schweizer Hitparade)	77
UK Singles (OCC)	66
US Billboard Hot 100	85
US Adult Pop Airplay (Billboard)	20
US Pop Airplay (Billboard)	33
US Rock & Alternative Airplay (Billboard)	42

Chart (2024)	Peak position
Netherlands (Single Top 100)	97
Sweden (Sverigetopplistan)	73

=== Year-end charts ===
Chart (2020)	Position
Australia (ARIA)	42
Canada (Canadian Hot 100)	86
Norway (VG-lista)	37

Chart (2021)	Position
Australia (ARIA)	84

Chart (2024)	Position
Australia (ARIA)	90

== Certifications ==
Region	Certification	Certified units/sales
Australia (ARIA)	8× Platinum	560,000^{‡}
Austria (IFPI Austria)	2× Platinum	60,000^{‡}
Canada (Music Canada)	Diamond	800,000^{‡}
Denmark (IFPI Danmark)	2× Platinum	180,000^{‡}
France (SNEP)	Gold	100,000^{‡}
Germany (BVMI)	Gold	200,000^{‡}
Italy (FIMI)	Gold	50,000^{‡}
New Zealand (RMNZ)	6× Platinum	180,000^{‡}
Poland (ZPAV)	Platinum	50,000^{‡}
Spain (Promusicae)	Platinum	60,000^{‡}
Switzerland (IFPI Switzerland)	Gold	10,000^{‡}
United Kingdom (BPI)	2× Platinum	1,200,000^{‡}
United States (RIAA)	6× Platinum	6,000,000^{‡}
Streaming
Sweden (GLF)	2× Platinum	16,000,000^{†}
^{‡} Sales+streaming figures based on certification alone.^{†} Streaming-only figures based on certification alone.

== Release history ==
Region	Date	Format	Version	Label	Ref.
Various	July 31, 2019	Digital download; streaming	Original	Columbia	
Various	November 8, 2019	Digital download; streaming	Duet	Columbia	
United States	January 20, 2020	Hot adult contemporary radio	Duet	Columbia	
United States	January 28, 2020	Contemporary hit radio	Original	Columbia	
