= Chasing Colors =

Single by Marshmello and Ookay featuring Noah Cyrus
- Released: February 24, 2017
- Recorded: September 2016
- Genre: Electronic
- Length: 3:15
- Label: Joytime Collective
- Songwriters: Marshmello; Abraham Laguna; Skyler Stonestreet; Chase Duddy
- Producers: Marshmello; Ookay

Marshmello singles chronology
"Ritual" (2016)	"Chasing Colors" (2017)	"Twinbow" (2017)

Ookay singles chronology
"Stay Forever" (2017)	"Chasing Colors" (2017)	"Lighthouse" (2017)

Noah Cyrus singles chronology
"Make Me (Cry)" (2016)	"Chasing Colors" (2017)	"Stay Together" (2017)

"Chasing Colors" is a song by American DJs Marshmello and Ookay featuring American singer Noah Cyrus. It was written and produced by the former two with additional writing credits going to Skyler Stonestreet and Chase Duddy and released on February 24, 2017 via Marshmello's label Joytime Collective.

== Background ==
The song was previously leaked by fans on SoundCloud, YouTube and Reddit as a WAV file. It featured the vocals of the song's co-writer, Skyler Stonestreet, and was previously dubbed "Living High". Marshmello said via his Facebook page that the track's release was actually brought forward due to the track leaking online. He stated: "When you leak an artists unreleased music you mess up all plans for that song. It's really not cool and is the reason why we decided to change things up."

== Composition ==
It features a 'cacophony of vocaloids' and big room synths alongside Cyrus' vocals.

== Charts ==
=== Weekly charts ===
Chart (2017–19)	Peak position
Canada Hot 100 (Billboard)	49
US Hot Dance/Electronic Songs (Billboard)	8

=== Year-end charts ===
Chart (2019)	Position
US Hot Dance/Electronic Songs (Billboard)	67
