= Ookay =

American DJ and producer (born 1992)

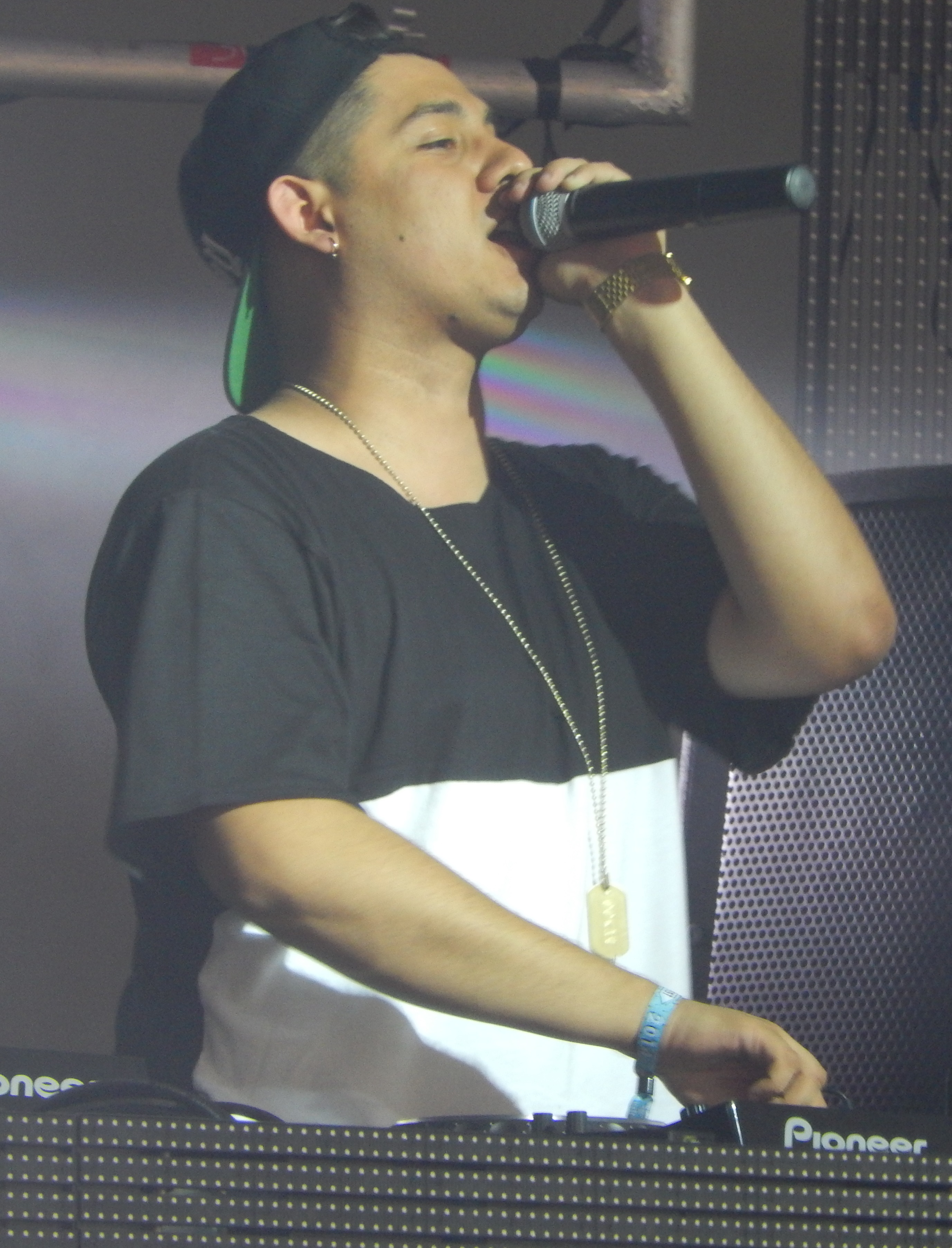
- Ookay in 2014

Background information
- Born: Abraham Laguna; January 10, 1992 (age 34); Chula Vista, California, U.S.
- Genres: Dubstep; trap; future bass
- Occupations: DJ; record producer; musician
- Years active: 2010–present
- Labels: Dim Mak; Mad Decent; Spinnin'; Skink; Armada; Monstercat

Abraham Laguna (born January 10, 1992), known by his stage name Ookay, is an American electronic music producer and DJ.

== Career ==
Laguna is based in Los Angeles and his father is a bassist who performed a bass solo during Ookay's Father's Day set at EDC 2015.

=== 2013 ===
Ookay teamed up with Diplo to remix Avicii's "You Make Me". The song was made available for a digital download on August 30, 2013.

=== 2014 ===
On March 10, 2014, Showtek and Ookay released a single titled "Bouncer" via Showtek's label Skink Records. An official music video was uploaded by Spinnin' Records' YouTube channel two weeks later.

On November 7, 2014, Ookay released his debut EP Ghost via Steve Aoki's label Dim Mak Records. When asked about his inspirations of creating the EP, Ookay said "I really wanted to push the boundaries of my skill. It's kind of a punch in the shoulder to my fans who get mad when I make anything other than trap. So I made an entire EP that's pretty much not trap (except Egg Drop Soup). Really trying to convince everyone that i'm not a one-trick-pony".

=== 2016 ===
On March 25, 2016, Ookay released a single titled "Thief" on digital platforms. A music video produced by Davin Tjen and directed by Rumena Dinevska for the song was uploaded onto Ookay's YouTube channel five days later. When asked when he started working on the song, Ookay said "...a year ago right after I came back from Coachella 2015". As of August 19, 2016, the song peaked at No. 27 on Billboard's Dance/Electronic Digital Songs chart.

On October 7, 2016, Ookay released his second extended play titled Cocoon consisting of five songs. Speaking about fellow DJ and friend, Big Makk who died in a car crash in August, Ookay said "I can't believe that it had to be this way and I didn't even get to say goodbye". A tribute event, in which Ookay was a performer, had raised $8,000 in donations with all proceeds going to Big Makk's family.

=== 2017 ===
Ookay released "Stay Forever" as a single for Valentine's Day. He later collaborated with Marshmello to release the single "Chasing Colors" featuring vocals by Noah Cyrus.

On September 1, Ookay collaborated with English singer-songwriter Fox Stevenson to release the future bass track "Lighthouse" on Canadian independent record label Monstercat. Erik of EDM Sauce described Lighthouse as "a bit repetitive at some points, which is really the only thing that is holding this tune back from a higher rating. Overall though, this song is fun and well put together".

=== 2020 ===
Ookay was set to perform at the Ultra music festival in March 2020, but the festival was cancelled due to concerns surrounding the COVID-19 coronavirus outbreak.

=== 2022 ===
In 2022, Ookay released his second album, "Very Special!", which featured collaborations with a variety of artists, including Flux Pavilion, Elohim, and Rachel Lorin. The album showcased Ookay's growth as an artist and his ability to create music that is both energetic and emotional. Ookay released several successful singles, including "Weekends" "Give U Up" and "Be OK".

== Discography ==
- Wow! Cool Album! (2018)
- Very Special (2022)
