= Noah Cyrus =

American singer and actress (born 2000)

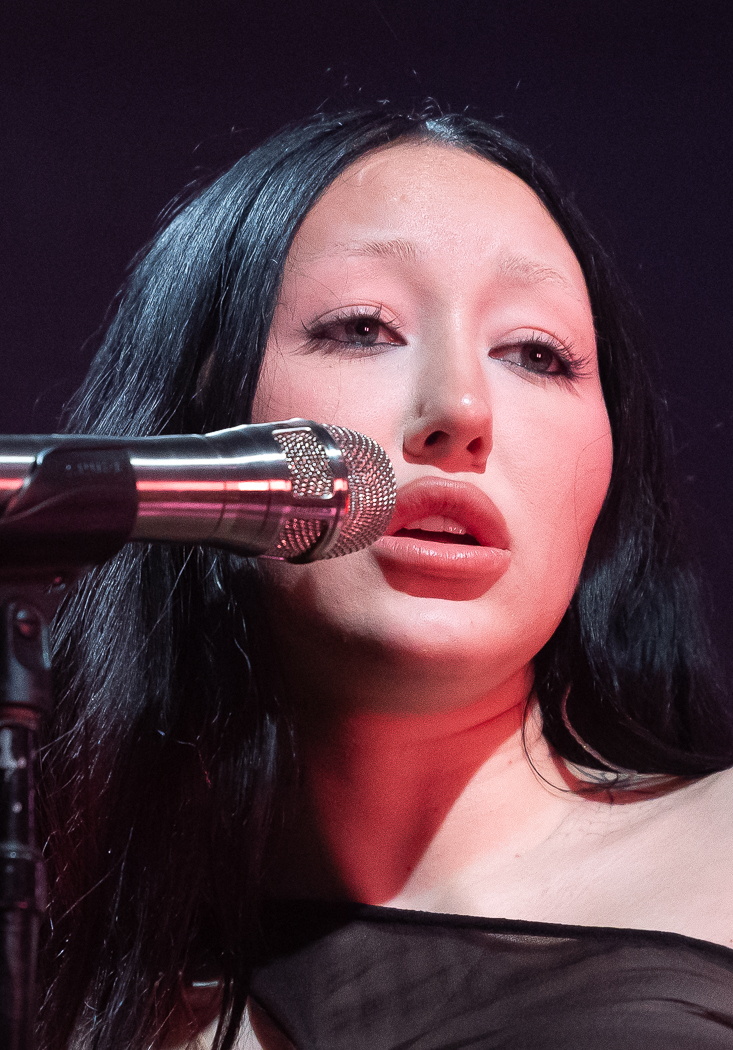
- Cyrus in 2023
- Born: Noah Lindsey Cyrus; January 8, 2000 (age 26); Nashville, Tennessee, U.S.
- Occupations: Singer; actress
- Years active: 2002–present
- Partner(s): Pinkus (2023–present; engaged)
- Parents: Billy Ray Cyrus (father); Tish Cyrus (mother)
- Relatives: Brandi Cyrus (sister); Trace Cyrus (brother); Miley Cyrus (sister); Joseph Purcell (stepbrother); Ron Cyrus (grandfather)
- Musical career
- Instrument: Vocals
- Labels: Records; Syco; Columbia; RCA; Walt Disney
- Website: noahcyrus.com

Noah Lindsey Cyrus (born January 8, 2000) is an American singer and actress. As a child actress, she voiced the titular character in the English dub of the film Ponyo (2008), and appeared in minor roles on shows including Hannah Montana and Doc. In 2016, she made her debut as a singer with the single "Make Me (Cry)" featuring Labrinth, which peaked at number 46 on the Billboard Hot 100. Cyrus has released three extended plays: Good Cry (2018), The End of Everything (2020), People Don't Change (2021). Her first full-length album, The Hardest Part, was released on September 16, 2022, to widespread critical acclaim. Her second studio album, I Want My Loved Ones to Go with Me, was released on July 11, 2025. She was nominated for Best New Artist at the 63rd Annual Grammy Awards. Cyrus is the youngest child of Billy Ray Cyrus and Tish Cyrus and the younger sister of Miley Cyrus.

== Early life ==
Noah Lindsey Cyrus was born on January 8, 2000, in Nashville, Tennessee, to producer and director Tish Cyrus and country singer Billy Ray Cyrus. Her parents each filed for divorce on several occasions. Her siblings include Miley, Braison, Brandi, Trace, and Christopher Cyrus, some of whom have also become musicians and entertainers. Their paternal grandfather, Ron Cyrus, was a politician in Kentucky. Cyrus, like many child performers, attended Brighton Hall School in Burbank, California.

== Career ==
=== Acting ===
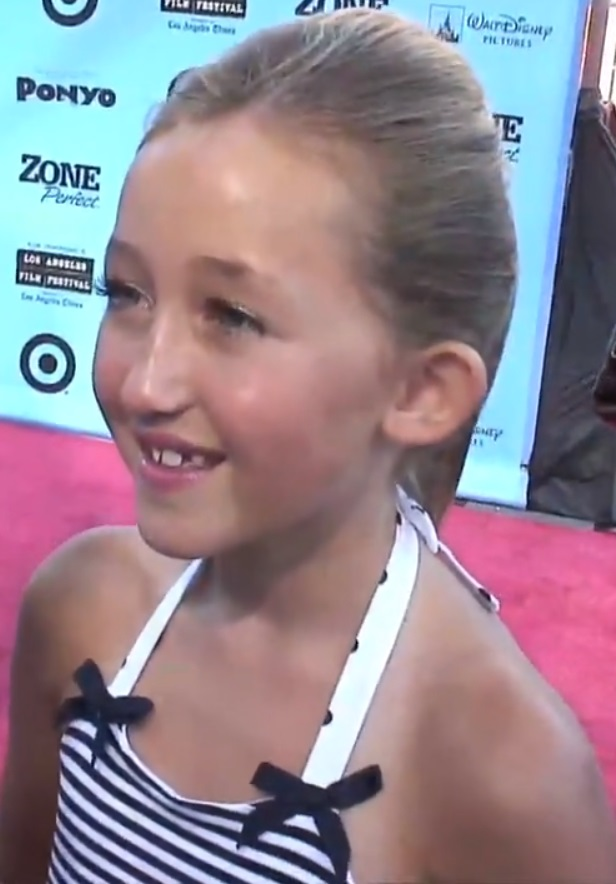
Cyrus at the premiere of Ponyo in 2009.

At the age of 2, Cyrus began her acting career, playing Gracie Hebert on the sixth episode of her father's TV show Doc. She was a background dancer in the 2009 film Hannah Montana: The Movie (with her real-life older sister Miley), and played small roles in six episodes of the Disney Channel original series Hannah Montana. She appeared in the straight-to-DVD film Mostly Ghostly: Who Let the Ghosts Out? (2008), where she was spotted as a Trick or Treater. In 2009, her first film role was in the English version of the Japanese anime feature film Ponyo, in which she voiced the titular character. She sang the English version of the theme song to that film, performing alongside her co-star Frankie Jonas. Between 2009 and 2010, Cyrus ran a webshow with her childhood best friend Emily Grace Reaves, which was titled The Noie and Ems Show. In 2021, she guest-starred in the seventh episode of the horror anthology series American Horror Stories, playing a character named Connie.

=== 2016–2018: Music beginnings and Good Cry ===
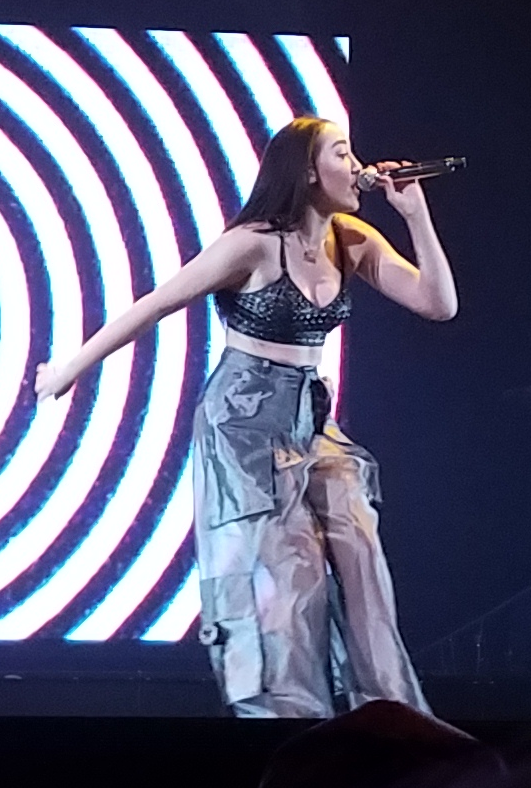
Cyrus during Katy Perry's Witness: The Tour.

On November 15, 2016, it was announced that Cyrus had signed a record deal with Barry Weiss' record label named Records, and later signed a management deal with Maverick under Adam Leber. She released her debut single "Make Me (Cry)" featuring English singer Labrinth that same day. In December 2016, she released an acoustic performance of "Almost Famous". She also provided vocals on the song "Chasing Colors" performed by Marshmello and Ookay, which was released in February 2017. On April 14, 2017, she released another single, called "Stay Together", followed by the single "I'm Stuck", released on May 25, 2017. On September 21, 2017, she released another single "Again" featuring XXXTentacion. From September 19, 2017, to November 1, 2017, she opened for Katy Perry on the Witness: The Tour. In November 2017, Cyrus made an appearance at Emo Nite in Los Angeles for a surprise DJ set which included some of her and her half-brother Trace Cyrus' music. "My Way", a collaboration with electronic group One Bit, was released on November 24, 2017. Cyrus was named one of Time's 30 Most Influential Teens in 2017.

Her first single of 2018, "We Are..." featuring Danish artist MØ, was released on February 7. Cyrus released "Team", a collaboration with MAX, on May 11, 2018. A follow-up collaboration "Lately", was released on June 15, 2018, with Tanner Alexander. On July 9, 2018, Cyrus announced her first headlining tour, The Good Cry Tour. "Live or Die", a collaboration with her now ex-boyfriend Lil Xan, was released on August 20, 2018. Norwegian DJ Matoma featured Cyrus on "Slow" in 2017, which was featured on his second album One in a Million, released on August 24, 2018. Cyrus released her new EP, Good Cry, on September 21, 2018, featuring new songs including "Mad at You" a collaboration with Gallant and "Punches" a collaboration with LP. DJ Alan Walker featured Cyrus' vocals on "All Falls Down" for his first album, Different World, which was released on December 14, 2018.

=== 2019–2021: The End of Everything and People Don't Change ===
On July 31, 2019, Cyrus released a song called "July", as the first single of her second EP, The End of Everything. On July 24, 2020, Cyrus released a cover of Mac Miller's "Dunno."

On May 15, 2020, Cyrus released her second EP, The End of Everything, which AllMusic reviewer, Neil Z. Yeung described as "a vulnerable peek into the singer/songwriter's mental and emotional struggles through heartfelt and simple offerings."

After the good reception of The End of Everything, she was prepared to release her first full-length album in early 2021. Cyrus released "All Three" on December 11, 2020, with its music video the following week. She did not comment on the subject again until February 8, 2021, when she announced on her Instagram that she was about to release a joint EP with recently songwriting collaborator PJ Harding ("July", "I Got So High That I Saw Jesus", "The End Of Everything") and its first single "Dear August" was going to be out three days later. The EP was called People Don't Change and was released on April 23, 2021.

=== 2022–present: The Hardest Part and tour ===
On April 5, 2022, Noah announced her new single "I Burned LA Down", released on April 8. On that same day, she announced her debut album, The Hardest Part, for July 15. The album was preceded by three more singles: "Mr. Percocet" released on May 13, "Ready To Go" on June 23 and "Every Beginning Ends" with Benjamin Gibbard on August 26. However, in June 2022, Cyrus announced that the album was pushed back to September 16 due to manufacturing delay. Following the album's release, Noah released "I Just Want A Lover", from the album on the same day of its release. Later, on September 23, Noah launched the remix of "Noah (Stand Still)" featuring her father, country music singer Billy Ray Cyrus. On October 14, she released an acoustic version for the song "Unfinished".

After being announced in May and cancelling the European leg, Cyrus began The Hardest Part Tour on October 4. After 24 shows, the tour ended on November 4, just a month after it began.

On November 18, Cyrus and long-time producer PJ Harding released a new song, "Snow In LA".

In May 2024, Cyrus released the duet "How Far Will We Take It?" with country musician Orville Peck. She was also featured on and helped write the single "My Fault" with country singer Shaboozey.

On July 11, 2025, Cyrus released a new album called I Want My Loved Ones To Go With Me, featuring guest appearances from Fleet Foxes, Ella Langley, Bill Callahan, and Blake Shelton. Reviews were very positive with the LA Times describing the album as "stunning".

On October 3, 2025, Noah Cyrus releases “If There’s a Heaven” featuring Stephen Wilson Jr.

== Personal life ==
Cyrus dated rapper Lil Xan from June to September 2018. Cyrus is known to be vocal about her mental health challenges. She experiences depression and anxiety, with panic attacks as part of the latter. She has stated she goes to therapy to address these challenges. Her music often relates to her struggles, such as in her EP Good Cry with "Sadness" and "Topanga" and somber songs such as in her EP The End of Everything with "July" and "Lonely".

In December 2020, Cyrus spoke out in support of the former One Direction member Harry Styles wearing a dress on the cover of Vogue after he had been criticized by conservative commentator Candace Owens. However, in doing this she called Owens a "nappy ass heaux," which briefly prompted backlash and scrutiny against Cyrus for using a racial term referring to Afro-centric hair texture. She subsequently issued an apology for using the term.

In June 2023, Cyrus announced her engagement to Pinkus, a German fashion designer.

== Activism ==
In 2013, Cyrus used her 13th birthday as an opportunity to raise funds to ban the use of horse-drawn carriages in New York City. She has also worked with People for the Ethical Treatment of Animals (PETA), first appearing in an ad protesting the use of animal dissection in high school science classes instead of plastic models or virtual dissection programs, then in another supporting a SeaWorld boycott.

== Philanthropy ==
In 2019, after the release of her single "Lonely", Noah teamed up with the Crystal Campaign and released a merchandising collection called The Lonely Collection in which funds were collected to benefit The Jed Foundation, a non-profit organization in the United States that exists to protect emotional health and prevent suicide for American teens and young adults. Later, Cyrus sold some of her old clothes on the Depop app, donating the proceeds to The Jed Foundation.

== Filmography ==
Film roles
Year	Title	Role	Notes
2008	Hannah Montana & Miley Cyrus: Best of Both Worlds Concert	Herself	Concert film
2008	Mostly Ghostly: Who Let the Ghosts Out?	Trick or Treater	Cameo
2008	Ponyo	Ponyo	Voice role (English version)
2009	Hannah Montana: The Movie	Dancer	Cameo

Television roles
Year	Title	Role	Notes
2002–04	Doc	Gracie Herbert	9 episodes Recurring role (Seasons 2–5)
2006–10	Hannah Montana	Various roles	6 episodes Recurring role (Seasons 1–2, 4)
2008	The Emperor's New School	Kid (Voice)	Episode: "Guaka Rules"
2012	The Joey & Elise Show	Herself	1 episode
2012	The Hugo & Rita Show	Hugo and Rita	4 episodes
2014	Take 2	Deb / Adamley / Allison	3 episodes
2017	Carpool Karaoke: The Series	Herself	Episode: "The Cyrus Family"
2020	MTV Unplugged Presents: Miley Cyrus Backyard Sessions	Herself	Television special
2021	American Horror Stories	Connie	Episode: "Game Over"
2022	Made from Scratch	Herself	Episode: "Noah Cyrus"
2023	American Idol	Herself	Guest mentor
2026	Hannah Montana 20th Anniversary Special	Herself	Television special
2026	9-1-1: Nashville	Herself	Episode: "Intrusive Thoughts"

Other roles
Year	Title	Role	Notes
2018	Stoney Stories	Herself (Voice)	YouTube Series
2019	I Think I'm OKAY	Herself	Music video by Machine Gun Kelly
2019	Graduation	Becky	Music video by benny blanco & Juice WRLD

As director
Year	Title	Role	Notes
2017	Again	Herself	Her own music video
2019	Lonely	Herself	Her own music video co-directed with Symone Ridgell

== Discography ==
- The Hardest Part (2022)
- I Want My Loved Ones to Go with Me (2025)

== Awards and nominations ==
Year	Award	Category	Work	Result
2017	Radio Disney Music Awards	Best Breakup Song	"Make Me (Cry)" (with Labrinth)	Nominated
2017	Radio Disney Music Awards	Best New Artist	Herself	Nominated
2017	MTV Video Music Awards	Best New Artist	Herself	Nominated
2017	MTV Europe Music Awards	Best Push	Herself	Nominated
2017	PETA's Annual Libby Award	Best Peta2 Ad	Speaking up against SeaWorld	Won
2018	WDM Radio Awards	Best Bass Track	"All Falls Down" (with Alan Walker, Digital Farm Animals & Juliander)	Nominated
2018	Nickelodeon Kids' Choice Awards	Favorite Breakout Artist	Herself	Nominated
2018	MTV Video Music Awards	Push Artist of the Year	Herself	Nominated
2020	LivexLive's The Lockdown Awards	Stronger Together: Favorite Group / All-Star Performance	"Beautiful Day"	Nominated
2020	LivexLive's The Lockdown Awards	Zoom Tune: Zoom Performance	"Beautiful Day"	Nominated
2021	63rd Annual Grammy Awards	Best New Artist	Herself	Nominated
2021	BMI Pop Awards	Award Winning Songs	"July"	Won
2021	CMT Music Awards	CMT Performance of The Year	"This Is Us" (with Jimmie Allen)	Nominated
2024	People's Choice Country Awards	The Crossover Song of 2024	"My Fault" (with Shaboozey)	Nominated
2026	Hollywood Music In Media Awards	Original Song - Feature Film	"Light Over The Hill"	Pending

== Tours ==
=== Headlining ===
- The Good Cry Tour (2018)
- The Not So Tour, Tour (2020)
- The Hardest Part Tour (2022–2023)
- I Want My Loved Ones to Go with Me Tour (2025)

=== Opening act ===
- Katy Perry – Witness: The Tour (2017)
- Alex Warren - Finding Family on the Road (July 2026)
