= PJ Harding =

Australian musician

- Origin: Sydney, Australia
- Genres: Folk; indie
- Occupations: Songwriter; Musician; producer
- Years active: 2015–present
- Labels: Universal Music Publishing Group RCA Records
- Website: https://www.pjharding.com/

Peter Harding, known professionally as PJ Harding, is an Australian singer-songwriter, musician, and producer originally from Sydney, Australia. PJ relocated to Los Angeles in 2019.

Peter is best known for co-writing 'July' with Noah Cyrus, earning over one billion streams and an ARIA 5× platinum certification. PJ was awarded the APRA AMCOS’ Billions Award. The song has reached multiple platinum status with seven times platinum in Canada, five times platinum in Australia, quadruple platinum in the US; and platinum in the UK, Austria, and Denmark. It was a top 10 song in New Zealand and the Netherlands.

== Career ==
PJ has written alongside artists including: Lennon Stella, Lil Nas X, Bebe Rexha, Chromeo, Ruel, Jessica Mauboy and Guy Sebastian

In April 2021, Harding and Cyrus released the People Don’t Change EP, featuring the single ‘Dear August’. The EP was by Records, LLC and RCA Records.

== Discography ==
=== Extended plays ===
List of EPs, with selected details
Title	Details
People Don't Change (with Noah Cyrus)	Released: April 2021; Label: LLC / RCA
To Fall Asleep	Released: June 2023; Label: LLC / RCA

== Awards and nominations ==
=== APRA Awards ===
The APRA Awards are presented annually from 1982 by the Australasian Performing Right Association (APRA), "honouring composers and songwriters". They commenced in 1982.

Year	Nominee / work	Award	Result	Ref.
2026	"While I Got Time" (Jessica Mauboy and PJ Harding)	Song of the Year	Shortlisted	

=== Vanda & Young Global Songwriting Competition ===
The Vanda & Young Global Songwriting Competition is an annual competition that "acknowledges great songwriting whilst supporting and raising money for Nordoff-Robbins" and is coordinated by Albert Music and APRA AMCOS. It commenced in 2009.

Year	Nominee / work	Award	Result	Ref.
2025	"Cascadia"	Vanda & Young Global Songwriting Competition	Finalist	
