= Metro Station discography =

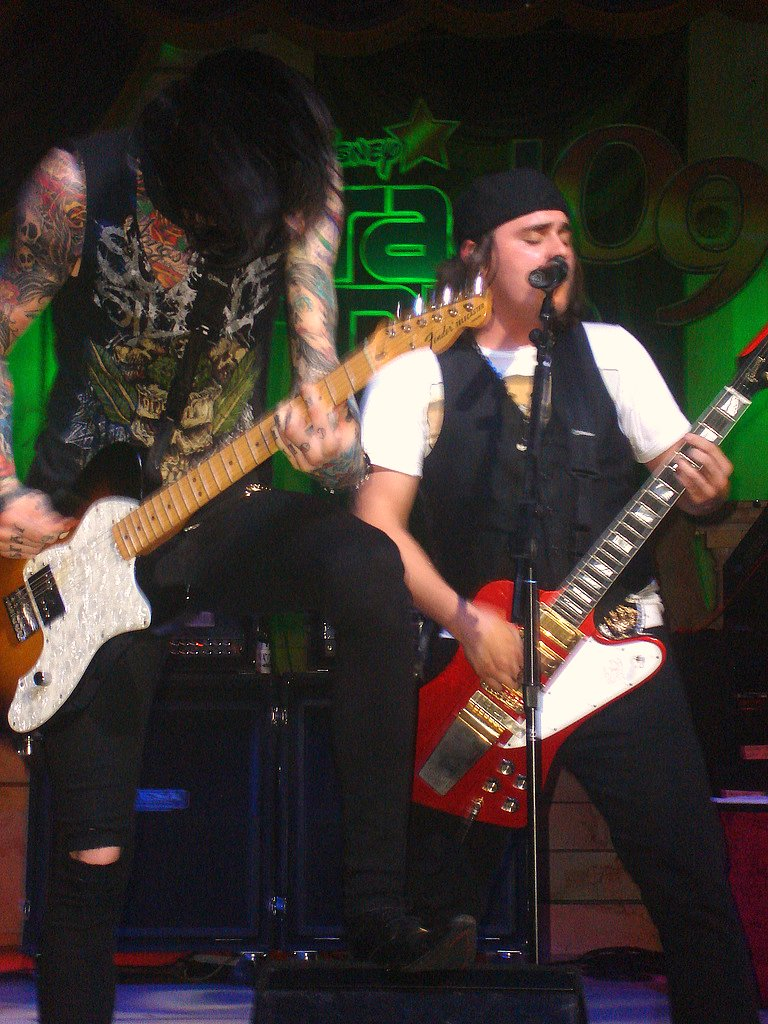
- Metro Station performing in 2009.
- Studio albums: 2
- EPs: 5
- Singles: 17
- Music videos: 13

The discography of American pop rock band Metro Station consists of two studio albums, five extended plays, 17 singles and 13 music videos. The band members consisted of Trace Cyrus and Mason Musso.

Metro Station released their debut EP, The Questions We Ask at Night, independently on March 31, 2006. Their first single "Kelsey" peaked at number 25 on the New Zealand Top 40 chart. On April 1, 2008, the group released their hit single "Shake It". The song went double platinum in the US and reached number 10 on the Billboard Hot 100. "Seventeen Forever" peaked at number 42 on the Billboard Hot 100 and was certified gold in the US. Their self-titled debut studio album was certified gold in Canada and reached number 39 on the Billboard 200. Their second studio album, Savior was released in 2015.

== Albums ==
=== Studio albums ===
List of studio albums, with selected chart positions, sales figures and certifications
Title	Album details	Peak chart positions										Sales	Certifications
Title	Album details	US	US Elec	US Rock	AUS	AUT	CAN	GER	IRE	NZ	UK	Sales	Certifications
Metro Station	Release date: September 18, 2007; Label: Columbia; Formats: CD, download, vinyl	39	1	15	17	29	31	27	36	39	35	US: 87,000	MC: Gold; RMNZ: Gold
Savior	Release date: June 30, 2015; Label: Metro Station Music; Formats: CD, download	—	—	—	—	—	—	—	—	—	—		
"—" denotes a recording that did not chart or was not released in that territory.

== Extended plays ==
Title	Details
The Questions We Ask at Night	Release date: March 31, 2006; Label: self-released; Formats: CD, download
Kelsey	Release date: September 28, 2009; Label: Columbia; Formats: CD, download
Middle of the Night	Release date: August 20, 2013; Label: self-released; Formats: CD, download
Gold	Release date: October 14, 2014; Label: Metro Station Music; Formats: Download
Bury Me My Love	Release date: September 8, 2017; Label: Metro Station Music; Formats: CD, vinyl, download

== Singles ==
=== Lead singles ===
List of singles as lead artist, with selected chart positions and certifications
Title	Year	Peak chart positions										Sales	Certifications	Album
Title	Year	US	US Pop	US Dance	AUS	AUT	BEL (FL)	CAN	GER	NZ	UK	Sales	Certifications	Album
"Kelsey"	2007	— (Note: "Kelsey" did not enter the Billboard Hot 100, but peaked at number one on the Hot Singles Sales chart.)	—	1	—	—	—	— (Note: "Kelsey" did not enter the Canadian Hot 100, but peaked at number one on the Canadian Singles Sales chart.)	—	25	—			Metro Station
"Control"	2007	—	—	—	—	—	—	—	—	—	—			Metro Station
"Shake It"	2008	10	4	17	2	9	17	4	9	9	6	WW: 4,000,000; US: 1,200,000; UK: 240,000	RIAA: 2× Platinum; ARIA: 2× Platinum; BPI: Platinum; BVMI: Gold; MC: 3× Platinum; RMNZ: Platinum	Metro Station
"Seventeen Forever"	2008	42	26	24	43	57	— (Note: "Seventeen Forever" did not enter the Ultratop 50, but peaked at number 5 on the Ultratip chart.)	74	61	—	89		RIAA: Gold	Metro Station
"Japanese Girl"	2009	—	—	—	—	—	—	—	—	—	—			Kelsey
"Time to Play"	2009	—	—	—	—	—	—	—	—	—	—			Kelsey
"Where's My Angel"	2010	—	—	—	—	—	—	—	—	—	—			Almost Alice
"Ain't So High"	2011	—	—	—	—	—	—	—	—	—	—			Non-album singles
"Closer and Closer"	2011	—	—	—	—	—	—	—	—	—	—			Non-album singles
"Every Time I Touch You"	2013	—	—	—	—	—	—	—	—	—	—			Middle of the Night
"I Don't Know You"	2013	—	—	—	—	—	—	—	—	—	—			Middle of the Night
"Love & War"	2014	—	—	—	—	—	—	—	—	—	—			Gold
"She Likes Girls"	2014	—	—	—	—	—	—	—	—	—	—			Gold
"Getting Over You" (featuring Ronnie Radke)	2015	—	—	—	—	—	—	—	—	—	—			Savior
"Young Again"	2017	—	—	—	—	—	—	—	—	—	—			Bury Me My Love
"Bury Me My Love"	2017	—	—	—	—	—	—	—	—	—	—			Bury Me My Love
"I Hate Society"	2020	—	—	—	—	—	—	—	—	—	—			Non-album single
"—" denotes a recording that did not chart or was not released in that territory.

=== Promotional singles ===
Title	Year	Album
"Better Than Me"	2015	Savior
"Married in Vegas"	2015	Savior
"Used By You"	2015	Savior
"Still Party"	2015	Savior

== Music videos ==
Title	Year	Director(s)	Ref.
"Kelsey" (Version 1)	2007	Dean Cain	
"Control"	2007	Josh Forbes	
"Shake It"	2008	Josh Forbes	
"Seventeen Forever"	2008	Josh Forbes	
"Wish We Were Older"	2009	Josh Forbes	
"Kelsey" (Version 2)	2009	Unknown	
"Japanese Girl"	2009	Anthony Improgo	
"Last Christmas"	2009	Unknown	
"Love & War"	2014	WATTS	
"She Likes Girls"	2014	WATTS	
"Gold"	2015	Jade Ehlers	
"Married in Vegas"	2016	WATTS	
"Young Again"	2017	Tyler Davis	
"Bury Me My Love"	2017	Tyler Davis	
