= The Questions We Ask at Night =

EP by Metro Station
- Released: March 31, 2006
- Genre: Synth-pop; dance-rock
- Length: 23:01
- Label: Self-released

Metro Station chronology
The Questions We Ask at Night (2006)	Metro Station (2007)

The Questions We Ask at Night is the debut EP by American pop rock band Metro Station which was released independently. It leaked onto the internet via blogs and BitTorrent in 2006, but, due to the minimal success online, the band did not take action to remove the leaked versions. Few copies of the EP were ever made due to the minimal demand for the band's music at the time of the EP's release.

== Background ==
In 2005, Mason Musso and Trace Cyrus agreed to meet on the set of Hannah Montana, which starred Mason's brother, Mitchel, and Trace's sister, Miley, as well his father Billy Ray. Sharing musical interests, they decided to form a band. The first song they wrote for the EP was "The Love that Left You to Die" and it was written at Musso's house. Shortly thereafter, Cyrus recruited Blake Healy as a keyboardist, synthesist, and bassist. Anthony Improgo later joined the band in 2006 as the drummer after the group released the song "Seventeen Forever" on MySpace.

According to Improgo, the band wrote the EP within 5–6 months. Five of the songs were later re-recorded for the band's self-titled debut album. "The Love That Left You To Die" was later re-recorded 11 years later and included on the band's 2017 release, Bury Me My Love, as a bonus track.

== Track listing ==
1. "Seventeen Forever" – 2:51
2. "Now That We're Done" – 3:45
3. "Kelsey" – 3:18
4. "California" – 2:36
5. "Goodnight and Goodbye" – 4:03
6. "Disco" – 3:20
7. "The Love That Left You to Die" – 3:08

== Personnel ==
- Trace Cyrus – guitar, vocals
- Mason Musso – vocals, guitar
- Blake Healy – synthesizer, beats, bass
- Anthony Improgo – drums
