= Control (Metro Station song) =

Single by Metro Station

from the album Metro Station
- Released: December 17, 2007
- Genre: Neon pop-punk
- Length: 3:20
- Label: Columbia
- Songwriters: Trace Cyrus; Mason Musso; Anthony Improgo; Blake Healy
- Producer: S*A*M and Sluggo

Metro Station singles chronology
"Kelsey" (2007)	"Control" (2007)	"Shake It" (2008)

Music video
- "Control" on YouTube

"Control" is a song by American pop band Metro Station. It was released on December 17, 2007, as the second single from their debut self-titled studio album. The song was released as the debut single in the UK in the spring of 2009.

== Background and release ==
"Control" was written by Mason Musso, Trace Cyrus, Blake Healy and Anthony Improgo while production was handled by S*A*M and Sluggo. The band performed the track on AOL Live Sessions.

The song was serviced to alternative radio on December 17, 2007. It was released digitally on August 19, 2008, containing a remix by Weird Science. The song was released as the debut single in the UK in March 2009.

== Critical reception ==
Joe DeAndrea of AbsolutePunk.net stated that the track, "starts off as slow but then quickly picks up the pace while a catchy chorus grabs a hold of your ears and doesn't let go." Nat Morris of AltSounds noted that the song has a "'single' vibe to them." Mary Huhn of New York Post called the song, "An inescapable electronic party track." Mackenzie Hall of Alternative Press remarked, "the chorus of 'Control' is the perfect thing to scream along to while speeding along country highways at midnight."

== Accolades ==
Accolades for "Control"
Publication	Country	Accolade	Year	Rank	Ref.
New York Post	United States	"Best Songs of 2008"	2008	67	

== Music video ==
The music video for "Control" was released on February 28, 2008, and was directed by Josh Forbes. The concept of the video showcases a house party taking place, with the band performing the track, as well as guitarist and vocalist Trace Cyrus making out with girls during the song's chorus.

== Track listing ==
Digital download
No.	Title	Length
1.	"Control" (Weird Science remix)	4:14

US CD single
No.	Title	Length
1.	"Control" (radio edit)	3:10
2.	"Control" (album version)	3:19

UK CD single
No.	Title	Length
1.	"Control"	3:19
2.	"Control" (instrumental)	3:19

== Credits and personnel ==
Credits for "Control" adapted from album's liner notes.

Metro Station

- Mason Musso – lead vocals, rhythm guitar
- Trace Cyrus – lead guitar, vocals
- Anthony Improgo – drums
- Blake Healy – bass, keyboards synthesizer

Production

- S*A*M and Sluggo – producer
- Sean Goulding – engineering
- Scott Riebling – engineering
- Mark Needham – mixing
- Will Brierre – assistant engineer
- Vlado Meller – mastering

== Release history ==
Release history for "Control"
Region	Date	Format	Label	Ref.
United States	December 17, 2007	Alternative radio	Columbia	
Various	August 19, 2008	Digital download; streaming	Sony	
United Kingdom	March 2009	Contemporary hit radio	Columbia	
