= Mitchel Musso discography =

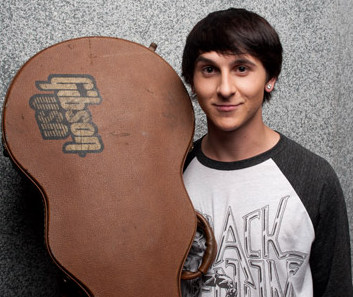
- Mitchel Musso on April 20, 2011
- Studio albums: 2
- Extended plays: 1
- Singles: 8
- Music videos: 15

This is a list of albums and singles released by singer Mitchel Musso. Musso has participated in many music ventures on June 2, 2009, and he released his self-titled debut under Walt Disney Records. He released his first extended play on November 22, 2010, titled Brainstorm. The EP is a Walmart exclusive.

== Albums ==
=== Studio albums ===
Title	Album details	Peak chart positions		
Title	Album details	US	CAN	MEX
Mitchel Musso	Released: June 2, 2009; Format: CD, digital download, streaming; Label: Hollywood	19	64	75
Ghost	Released: October 28, 2022; Format: CD, digital download, streaming; Label: Musso Records	—	—	—
"—" denotes releases that did not chart

=== Live albums ===
Title	Album details
Live at the Fillmore	Released: April 20, 2010; Format: streaming, digital download; Label: Walt Disney Records

== Extended plays ==
Title	EP details
Brainstorm	Released: November 22, 2010; Format: CD, digital download, streaming; Label: 717

== Singles ==
List of singles, with selected chart positions
Title	Year	Peak chart positions				Album
Title	Year	US	US Bub.	US Pop	CAN	Album
"If I Didn't Have You" (with Emily Osment)	2008	—	7	80	—	Disneymania 6
"Hey"	2009	70	—	—	79	Mitchel Musso
"Shout It"	2009	—	—	—	—	Mitchel Musso
"Get Away"	2010	—	—	—	—	Brainstorm
"Celebrate"	2010	—	—	—	—	Brainstorm
"Drank"	2022	—	—	—	—	Ghost
"Experience" (featuring Marc Musso)	2022	—	—	—	—	Ghost
"Volcano" (featuring Marc Musso)	2022	—	—	—	—	Ghost
"—" denotes releases that did not chart

=== Promotional singles ===
List of promotional singles
Title	Year	Album
"The In Crowd"	2008	Mitchel Musso
"Welcome to Hollywood"	2009	Mitchel Musso
"Top of the World" (featuring Doc Shaw)	2011	Non-album singles
"Crystal Ball"	2011	Non-album singles
"Replaceable"	2012	Non-album singles

== Album appearances ==
Year	Song	Album
2009	"The Three Rs"	Schoolhouse Rock!-Earth
2009	"Do Nothing Day" (with Ashley Tisdale)	Phineas and Ferb
2009	"Let It Go" (with Tiffany Thornton)	Disney Channel Playlist
2009	"The Girl Cant Help It"	Disney Channel Playlist
2009	"Let's Make This Last Forever"	Hannah Montana 3
2009	"Every Little Thing She Does Is Magic"	Wizards of Waverly Place
2009	"Jingle Bell Rock"	A Very Special Christmas 7
2009	"Thank You Santa"	Phineas and Ferb Christmas Vacation
2010	"Stand Out"	Disneymania 7
2010	"I'm So Me" (featuring VA Streetz)	Non-album single
