= Mitchel Musso (album) =

Studio album by Mitchel Musso
- Released: June 2, 2009
- Recorded: 2008–2009
- Genre: Pop; pop rock
- Length: 40:58
- Label: Walt Disney
- Producer: Brian Malouf

Mitchel Musso chronology
| Mitchel Musso (2009) | Brainstorm (2010) |

Singles from Mitchel Musso
- 1. "Hey" Released: May 19, 2009; 2. "Shout It" Released: September 22, 2009

Professional ratings
Review scores
| Source | Rating |
|---|---|
| AllMusic | 3.5/5 stars |

Mitchel Musso is the debut album by Mitchel Musso. The album was released under Walt Disney Records on June 2, 2009.

== Background ==
Musso worked with Sam Hollander, Dave Katz, Bryan Todd, Justin Gray, Curt Schneider, Matthew Wilder, and other producers and songwriters to produce the album in Los Angeles and New York. Musso also contributed to co-writing two songs from the album's thirteen tracks. Mitchel sings solo on all of the tracks except two titled "Us Against the World" and "Shout It". The two are a duet featuring singer Katelyn Tarver and Musso's brother Mason Musso respectively. Musso stated: "But actually my favorite song off my album is a duet, "Us Against the World" and it's my favorite song. I feel like it's got the most uh, it's kind of a dark vibe but at the same time it's a really upbeat like uh, I would say a happy song. And I think the girl's voice, is Katelyn Tarver, so it was awesome getting her on the track." "Let's Make This Last 4Ever" was featured on an episode of Hannah Montana and a track on the Hannah Montana 3 soundtrack. "Hey" was used as the theme song to the primetime sitcom Unhitched, which was about a group of 4 newly singled 30-somethings starting over and living together in Boston.

== Release ==
The album was released on June 2, 2009. The physical CD includes a fold-out poster of Musso. They also include an exclusive stream of "Let's Make This Last 4Ever" stream, which will be available once the album is purchased.

Musso promoted the album by setting out on a summer tour with over 54 scheduled dates across the United States and Canada. The band KSM opened for him on a select number of dates. Musso also performed as the opening act for his older brother's band Metro Station on 9 dates between July 23 and August 14, 2009. Honor Society also opened for some of his shows. Musso promoted the album by performing three songs off the album at the Wango Tango music festival in Los Angeles on May 9, 2009.

== Commercial performance ==
In its first week of release the album sold 20,000 units, which put it at #19 on the Billboard 200. As of August 2009, the album has sold over 100,000 copies in the U.S.

== Singles ==
"Hey" was released as the lead single from the album. Musso filmed a music video for the song and the video premiered on Disney Channel on May 15, 2009. The song debuted at number 70 on the Billboard Hot 100.

"Shout It" was announced as a single by Musso on his official Twitter page. The music video for the song, which features scenes from his tour, was released on September 29, 2009, on iTunes.

Other songs

"The in Crowd" was released as a promotional single on December 5, 2008. A music video was launched on Disney Channel in early March.

== Track listing ==
| No. | Title | Writer(s) | Length |
|---|---|---|---|
| 1. | "Hey" | Tim Pagnotta, Ryan Gillmor | 3:01 |
| 2. | "Speed Dial" | James Bourne, Busbee | 3:21 |
| 3. | "Us Against the World" (featuring Katelyn Tarver) | PJ Bianco, Eddie Galan | 4:01 |
| 4. | "Do It Up" | Max Martin, Per Aldeheim | 3:19 |
| 5. | "Shout It" (featuring Mason Musso) | Tim Myers, Mitchel Musso, Sam Musso | 3:38 |
| 6. | "Welcome to Hollywood" | Bryan Todd, Andreas Carlsson | 2:28 |
| 7. | "You Didn't Have To (Walk Away)" | Ali Dee Theodore, Jason Gleed | 4:15 |
| 8. | "Get Out" | Luke Laird, Lindy Robbins, Matthew Wilder | 3:30 |
| 9. | "How to Lose a Girl" | Sam Hollander, Dave Katz, Mitchel Musso | 3:24 |
| 10. | "The In Crowd" | John Hampson, Billy Mann | 3:45 |
| 11. | "Odd Man Out" | Michelle Lewis, Curt Schneider | 3:30 |
| 12. | "Movin' In" | Galan, Bianco, Steve Sundholm, Leland Grant, Sam Musso | 2:46 |
| Total length: | | | 40:58 |

iTunes Store bonus track
| No. | Title | Writer(s) | Length |
|---|---|---|---|
| 13. | "Stuck on You" | Galan, Bianco, Sundholm | 3:18 |
| Total length: | | | 44:16 |

=== Exclusive packages ===
Physical CD

- Fold out poster of Musso
- CD unlocks an exclusive stream of the song "Let's Make This Last 4Ever"

=== Outtakes ===
1. "Leavin'"
2. "Let's Go"
3. "Wasn't Your Girlfriend"
4. "White Striped Gloves"

== Charts ==
Chart performance
| Chart (2009) | Peak position |
|---|---|
| Canadian Albums (Nielsen SoundScan) | 64 |
| Mexican Albums (Top 100 Mexico) | 75 |
| US Billboard 200 | 19 |

== International release ==
The album was released in the UK on August 24 and in Spain released on August 25. Residents in the UK could listen to full tracks from the album until August 31 on Disney My Page.

== Personnel ==
- Dwight A. Baker - Drums, Engineer
- James Bourne - Vocals (background)
- Alex Bush - Engineer
- Andreas Carlsson - Guitar
- Randy Cooke - Drums
- Simon Curtis - Vocals (background)
- Eddie Galan - Producer, Vocals (background)
- Steven "Stizzle" Schneider - Co-Producer, Programming
- Steve Gerdes - Art Direction, Design
- Jason Gleed - Producer
- Taylor Harris - Vocal Editing
- David Krauklis - Drums
- Kenny Livingston - Drums
- Gavin MacKillop - Engineer
- Brian Malouf - Executive Producer, Mixing
- Stephen Marcussen - Mastering
- Mason Musso - Vocals (background)
- Mitchel Musso - Vocals (lead & background)
- Tim Pagnotta - Guitar, Keyboards, Producer, Engineer
- Brett Rosenberg - Guitar
- Curt Schneider - Synthesizer, Bass, Producer, Engineer, Mixing
- Blair Sinta - Drums
- Greg Suran - Bass, Guitar, Engineer
- Gavin Taylor - Design
- Ali Dee Theodore - Producer
- Bryan Todd - Programming, Producer, Engineer, Mixing
- Graham Ward - Drums
- Bruce Watson - Guitar
