= She Likes Girls =

Single by Metro Station

from the album Gold
- Released: September 9, 2014
- Recorded: October 2013
- Genre: Pop rock
- Length: 3:57
- Label: Metro Station Music
- Songwriters: Trace Cyrus; Mason Musso
- Producers: Cyrus; Musso

Metro Station singles chronology
"Love & War" (2014)	"She Likes Girls" (2014)	"Getting Over You" (2015)

Music video
- "She Likes Girls" on YouTube

"She Likes Girls" is a song by American pop band Metro Station. It was released on September 9, 2014, as the second single from their fourth extended play, Gold.

== Background ==
The song is about a guy who realizes that his girlfriend is actually attracted to other women but, "instead of being mad about it, you just support her," according to Cyrus.

== Composition ==
"She Likes Girls" was written and produced by Mason Musso and Trace Cyrus. Cyrus noted that the band wanted to write something different and how they "haven't written about something this risqué."

"We're being positive and kind of letting people know that it's okay, whatever you do — if you like girls, guys, whatever it is — you shouldn't be judging people on it. The main point of life is just to be happy."

The track was recorded in October 2013, in Musso's bedroom at his home studio, and the concept of the song was dreamed up by Musso, who thought the idea was "interesting."

== Critical reception ==
"She Likes Girls" was met with positive reviews from music critics. Alyson Stokes of idobi Radio called the song's chorus, "energetic and pulsating," and compared the track to Katy Perry's, "I Kissed a Girl". James Shotwell of Under the Gun Review described the track as, "over simplistic and incredibly infectious." Trish Bendix of AfterEllen praised the band's different approach on writing about women's sexuality, compared to other artists who write about women's sexuality. She stated, "It's not overtly offensive other than their simply making assumptions about a fictional woman without, you know, having a conversation about it."

== Music video ==
The music video for "She Likes Girls" premiered via VEVO on October 29, 2014, and was directed by WATTS.

== Personnel ==
Credits for "She Likes Girls" adapted from the EP's digital liner notes.

- Trace Cyrus – vocals, lead guitar, keyboards, bass guitar
- Mason Musso – vocals, keyboards, rhythm guitar, synthesizers
- Spencer Steffan – drums, percussion

== Release history ==
Release history and formats for "She Likes Girls"
Region	Date	Format	Label	Ref.
Various	September 9, 2014	Digital download; streaming	Metro Station Music	
