= Tell Me What to Do =

Tell Me What to Do may refer to:

- "Tell Me What to Do", a 2017 song by Chris Brown from Heartbreak on a Full Moon
- "Tell Me What to Do", a 2007 song by Metro Station from Metro Station
- "Tell Me What to Do", a 2016 song by Shinee from 1 of 1
