= Used By You =

Used By You may refer to:

- "Used By You", a 2013 song by Marcus Canty from This...Is Marcus Canty
- "Used By You", a 2015 song by Metro Station from Savior
