= Dreamkid =

South African musician and social media personality (born 1983)

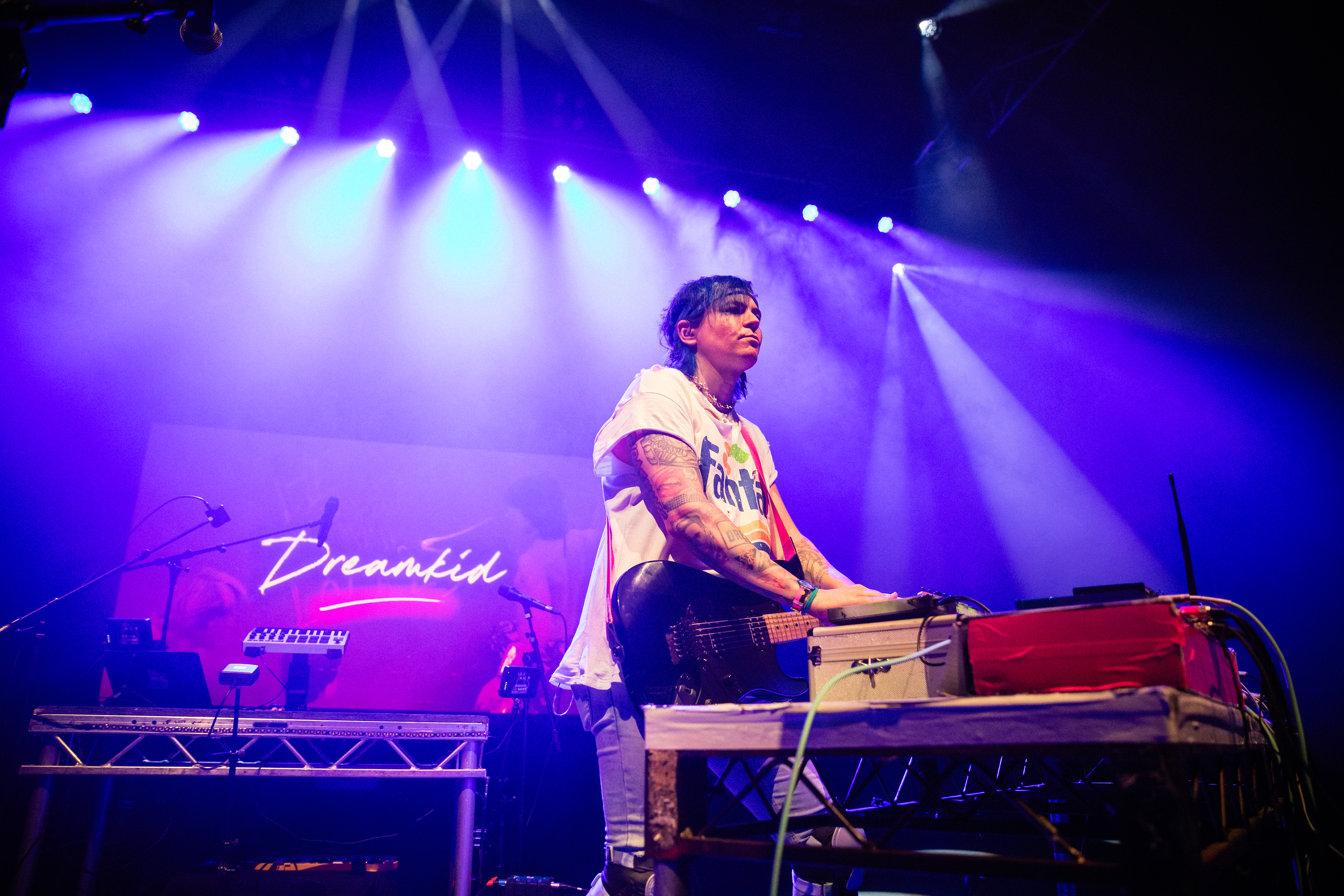
- Dreamkid performing at O2 Shepherds Bush Empire, London in 2025

Background information
- Born: Ryan Christopher Morris; 14 January 1983 (age 43); Durban, South Africa
- Origin: London, United Kingdom
- Genres: Synthwave; soundtracks; synth-pop
- Occupations: Musician; social media personality
- Years active: 2005–present
- Labels: Sumerian Records; Outland Recordings
- Website: dreamkid83.com

Instagram information
- Page: D r e a m k i d
- Genre: Music
- Followers: 273k

TikTok information
- Page: Dreamkid
- Followers: 196.3k
- Last updated: 16 September 2026

Ryan Christopher Morris (born 14 January 1983), known professionally as Dreamkid, is a South African musician and social media influencer based in London, United Kingdom.

== Early life ==
Ryan Christopher Morris was born on 14 January 1983 in Durban, South Africa. He grew up in the Ballito area of Durban spending his formative years skateboarding, surfing and playing the guitar. Morris has revealed that the first music cassette he owned was MC Hammer’s Please Hammer Don't Hurt 'Em and that he enjoyed listening to Blink 182, which inspired him to play in punk rock bands.

== Career ==
=== 2005–2018: Career beginnings and New Volume ===
Morris relocated to the United Kingdom in 2005 and founded the South African pop punk band New Volume. In 2015, New Volume signed with Sumerian Records.

=== 2019-2022: TikTok, Instagram and Dreamkid ===
Morris gained notoriety as Dreamkid through TikTok where, starting with the first lockdown during the COVID-19 pandemic in March 2020, he began posting tropes with 80s music arrangements. Dreamkid’s prominence on TikTok grew as his account went from 1000 to 100,000 followers in five weeks, and as the self-proclaimed creator of blinkwave, he amassed a celebrity following with Zooey Deschanel, Freddie Prince Jr., Donnie Wahlberg, David Arquette and Zachary Levi.

He would go on to mirroring his success from TikTok to Instagram, hosting POV reels performing unlikely synthwave style covers of Nirvana, Metallica, The Smashing Pumpkins and Green Day, alongside takes of songs by pop performers like Taylor Swift and Billie Eilish.

Dreamkid's lead single for his debut self-titled album "Hearts Don't Beat The Same When They're Hurting" was released in September 2021. The album itself was released in May 2022 and had a notable bubblegum pop influence while also keeping the sounds varied and pacey.

=== 2023-present: Daggers ===
In May 2023, a music video was released for the single "Street Lights". Another single, "Take Me On Tonight", was released in September 2023, with Metro Station's Mason Musso featured on vocals.

"Chrissy", a single released in June 2023 off the album Daggers, is regarded as the artist’s de facto instrumental viral hit. With 3 million plays and 150,000 reel shares on Instagram along with over one million plays on TikTok, it also appeared in Premier League football team reels and syncs with independent Hollywood movies.

By the time his sophomore album Daggers was released on 31 May 2024, Music News wrote that Dreamkid was "...undoubtedly the first artist in the synthwave genre to go viral on TikTok and Instagram." The album peaked at 94 on the UK Official Album Downloads Chart.

In 2025, Dreamkid collaborated with American singer songwriter Bonnie McKee and a synth-heavy remix of her track "Easy" off the album Bombastic was released on 20 June that year.

Dreamkid was invited to create a synthesizer patch preset pack for Baby Audio, which was released as part of their BA-1 synth plugin update released on 5 November 2025.

== Filmography ==
Dreamkid provided music for The Invisible Raptor and Veselka: The Rainbow on the Corner at the Center of the World. His song "Chrissy" was featured in the independent Hollywood Blockbuster horror film Terrifier 3.

== Musical Style & Influences ==
While he has his roots in punk rock, Morris has described Dreamkid's sound as #blinkwave and he is known for his synth-heavy compositions that evoke nostalgia. Texx and the City described his music as a "refreshingly emo take on synthwave" with a high level of production quality.

== Discography ==
=== Studio albums ===
Title	Details
Dreamkid	Released: 13 May 2022; Label: Outland Recordings; Formats: CD, digital download, Vinyl (LP)
Dreamkid (Instrumental Edition)	Released: 15 December 2023; Label: Outland Recordings; Formats: digital download
Daggers	Released: 31 May 2024; Label: Outland Recordings; Formats: CD, digital download, Vinyl (LP)
Daggers (Instrumental Edition)	Released: 28 February 2025; Label: Outland Recordings; Formats: digital download

=== Extended plays ===
Title	Details	Track listing
All Thriller, No Filler	Released: 18 October 2024; Label: blinkwave; Format: digital download	"Shit's About to Get Weird"; "The Watcher"; "Run Jennifer, Run!"
Memories Of The Future (Vol.1)	Released: 10 January 2025; Label: Outland Recordings; Format: digital download	"Good Tonight x Chrissy" (featuring Izzy Perri); "Oceanside Homicide x City Limits" (featuring Izzy Perri)

=== Singles ===
==== As lead artist ====
Title	Year	Album
"Hearts Don't Beat the Same When They're Hurting"	2021	Dreamkid
"Fatal Attraction"	2021	Dreamkid
"Game Over"	2022	Dreamkid
"America"	2022	Dreamkid
"Street Lights"	2023	Daggers
"Chrissy"	2023	Daggers
"Take Me On Tonight" (featuring Mason Musso)	2023	Daggers
"The Highway"	2024	Daggers
"Apocalyptic Love Song"	2026	
"Innocent Runaway"	2026	

==== As featured artist ====
Title	Year	Album
"All I Need Is You" (The Last Concorde featuring Dreamkid)	2023	Flashback

=== Remixes ===
Year	Artist	Song
2025	Bonnie McKee	"Easy"
