= Kelsey (song) =

Single by Metro Station

from the album Metro Station
- B-side: "Last Christmas"
- Released: August 7, 2007
- Recorded: 2007
- Genre: Synth-pop
- Length: 3:37 (Album Version); 3:24 (TLA Remix)
- Label: Columbia
- Songwriter: Metro Station
- Producers: Justin Pierre; Josh Cain

Metro Station singles chronology
| "Kelsey" (2007) | "Control" (2007) |

Kelsey EP chronology
| The Questions We Ask at Night (2006) | Kelsey EP (2009) | Middle of the Night (2013) |

EP cover

Music video
- "Kelsey" on YouTube

"Kelsey" is a song by American pop band Metro Station. It was released on August 7, 2007, as the first single from their debut studio album, Metro Station. It was re-released on March 17, 2009, after the success of "Shake It" and "Seventeen Forever".

In addition, the Kelsey EP was released on September 28, 2009. The UK version was released on November 27, 2009 and features a cover version of "Last Christmas".

== Background ==
The song was produced by Justin Pierre and Josh Cain from the band Motion City Soundtrack. Pierre also sings backing vocals and Cain played bass on the song.

The song was written about a girl named Kelsey, and is a ballad track with Mason Musso singing, "I'll swim the ocean for you." The track runs at 120 BPM and is in the key of C major. The single debuted at number 40 on the New Zealand Singles Chart and later peaked at number 25.

== Critical reception ==
Professional ratings
Review scores
| Source | Rating |
|---|---|
| Alternative Press | 3/5 stars |
| Melodic | 3.5/5 stars |

Tim Karan of Alternative Press gave a mixed review on Kelsey. He stated, "It's not that the songs on this EP are bad," praising songs such as "Kelsey" and "Japanese Girl" for its "killer synth hook." However was critical on the lyrical content of the EP. Pär Winberg of Melodic gave a positive review praising the tracks "Time To Play" and "Japanese Girl" for its "magnificent synth based modern pop rock with refrains extravaganza."

== Music video ==
The first version of the music video has all of the band members playing the song in split-screen. This version was released on September 6, 2007, and was directed by Jesse Cain. The band re-shot the video in May 2009 and made a whole new music video which was released on TeenNick on October 2, 2009. The video features actress Aimee Teegarden. The second music video was directed by Josh Forbes.

== Track listing ==
CD single
| No. | Title | Length |
|---|---|---|
| 1. | "Kelsey" | 3:37 |
| 2. | "Kelsey" (Walter Meego Remix) | 3:43 |
| 3. | "Last Christmas" | 3:56 |

Digital download
| No. | Title | Length |
|---|---|---|
| 1. | "Kelsey" | 3:37 |

Kelsey (EP)
| No. | Title | Length |
|---|---|---|
| 1. | "Kelsey" (Walter Meego Remix) | 3:45 |
| 2. | "Japanese Girl" | 3:10 |
| 3. | "Time to Play" | 3:37 |
| 4. | "Kelsey" (Acoustic Version) | 3:28 |
| 5. | "Kelsey" (Music Video) | 3:20 |

Kelsey (EP) UK edition
| No. | Title | Length |
|---|---|---|
| 1. | "Kelsey" | 3:37 |
| 2. | "Last Christmas" | 3:55 |
| 3. | "Time to Play" | 3:37 |
| 4. | "Japanese Girl" | 3:10 |
| 5. | "Kelsey" (Walter Meego Remix) | 3:45 |
| 6. | "Kelsey" (Acoustic Version) | 3:28 |
| 7. | "Kelsey" (Music Video) | 3:20 |

== Charts ==
Chart performance for "Kelsey"
| Chart (2008–09) | Peak position |
|---|---|
| Canada (Nielsen Soundscan) | 1 |
| New Zealand (Recorded Music NZ) | 25 |
| US Dance Singles Sales (Billboard) | 1 |
| US Hot Singles Sales (Billboard) | 1 |

== Release history ==
Release dates and formats for "Kelsey"
| Region | Date | Format | Label | Ref. |
|---|---|---|---|---|
| Various | August 7, 2007 | Digital download | Columbia | |
| United States | September 28, 2009 | Digital download | Columbia | |
| United Kingdom | November 27, 2009 | Digital download | Columbia | |
| United Kingdom | December 14, 2009 | CD | Columbia | |
| United Kingdom | December 14, 2009 | Contemporary hit radio | Columbia | |
