= Seventeen Forever =

Single by Metro Station

from the album Metro Station
- B-side: "Kelsey"
- Released: December 13, 2008
- Recorded: 2007
- Genre: Synthpop; dance-punk; neon pop
- Length: 2:54
- Label: Columbia
- Songwriters: Trace Cyrus; Mason Musso; Blake Healy; Anthony Improgo
- Producer: S*A*M and Sluggo

Metro Station singles chronology
"Shake It" (2008)	"Seventeen Forever" (2008)	"Japanese Girl" (2009)

Music video
- "Seventeen Forever" on YouTube

"Seventeen Forever" is a song by the American pop band Metro Station, released as the fourth and final single from the group's 2007 self-titled debut studio album. The single was released on December 13, 2008. The song peaked at number 42 on the Billboard Hot 100 and is certified gold in the United States.

The song also debuted at number 53 on the Australian Singles Chart and peaked at number 43. The song was released as the band's second UK single on July 13, 2009, and peaked at number 89.

== Background and composition ==
The group originally released the song on MySpace in 2006 and topped the MySpace Music's Unsigned Bands chart. Not only did it garner the attention of fans, but of drummer Anthony Improgo, who joined the band. According to frontman Trace Cyrus, the song is very "meaningful" to the band, and it was the first song they made.

Trace Cyrus told Kerrang! magazine that this song is "about wanting to be in a relationship with a girl who’s underage so bad and how age limitations don’t let you do that." The track runs at 140 BPM and is in the key of C minor.

== Critical reception ==
"Seventeen Forever" was met with mixed reviews from music critics. CBBC Newsround called the track, "very catchy" and "infectious." They stated, "this is a track that'll put a smile on your face and make you want to get up and dance about with your mates." Mayer Nissim of Digital Spy gave a more negative review calling it a "bland pop-rock" track. He stated that the song is a "mockery of young love, rather than a celebration of it."

== Accolades ==
Accolades for "Seventeen Forever"
Publication	Country	Accolade	Year	Rank	Ref.
About.com	United States	Top 100 Songs of 2008	2008	85	

== Music video ==
On December 5, 2008, the music video was released on MTV and has premiered in Canada through the Muchmusic and the MuchAxs video streaming website. The video is shot at night with the band performing at a carnival in Santa Clarita, California. The video was directed Josh Forbes and includes cameos from Miley Cyrus, Billy Ray Cyrus, and Mitchel Musso.

== Track listing ==
CD single
No.	Title	Length
1.	"Seventeen Forever"	2:54
2.	"Seventeen Forever" (Instrumental)	2:54

Digital download
No.	Title	Length
1.	"Seventeen Forever" (Radio Mix)	3:02
2.	"Seventeen Forever" (Acoustic Version)	1:52

Seventeen Forever (EP)
No.	Title	Length
1.	"Seventeen Forever" (Radio Mix)	3:02
2.	"Shake It" (Lenny B Remix - Extended Version)	7:14
3.	"Kelsey" (Acoustic Version)	3:27
4.	"Seventeen Forever" (Acoustic Version)	1:52

== Charts ==
=== Weekly charts ===
Weekly chart performance for "Seventeen Forever"
Chart (2008–09)	Peak position
Australia (ARIA)	43
Australia Dance (ARIA)	7
Austria (Ö3 Austria Top 40)	57
Belgium (Ultratip Bubbling Under Flanders)	5
Canada Hot 100 (Billboard)	74
Germany (GfK)	61
Lithuania (EHR)	22
Russia Airplay (Tophit)	274
Singapore Airplay (Mediacorp)	8
UK Singles (OCC)	89
US Billboard Hot 100	42
US Dance/Mix Show Airplay (Billboard)	24
US Pop Airplay (Billboard)	26

=== Year-end charts ===
Year-end chart performance for "Seventeen Forever"
Chart (2008)	Position
Australia Dance (ARIA)	47
Chart (2009)	Position
Australia Dance (ARIA)	31

== Certifications ==
Certifications for "Seventeen Forever"
Region	Certification	Certified units/sales
United States (RIAA)	Gold	500,000^{^}
^{^} Shipments figures based on certification alone.

== Release history ==
Release dates and formats for "Seventeen Forever"
Region	Date	Format	Label	Ref.
Australia	December 13, 2008	Digital download	Columbia	
New Zealand	December 13, 2008	Digital download	Columbia	
Italy	May 8, 2009	Contemporary hit radio	Sony	
United Kingdom	July 12, 2009	Digital download	Columbia	
Austria	August 21, 2009	Digital download	Columbia	
Various	August 28, 2009	CD	Columbia	
