= Metro Station (album) =

Studio album by Metro Station
- Released: September 18, 2007
- Recorded: 2006–2007
- Genres: Scene pop; synth-pop; neon pop-punk
- Length: 30:56 (standard edition); 43:33 (deluxe edition)
- Label: Columbia/Red Ink
- Producers: S*A*M and Sluggo; Joshua Cain; Justin Pierre

Metro Station chronology
The Questions We Ask at Night (2006)	Metro Station (2007)	Kelsey (2009)

Singles from Metro Station
- 1. "Kelsey" Released: August 7, 2007; 2. "Control" Released: December 17, 2007; 3. "Shake It" Released: April 1, 2008; 4. "Seventeen Forever" Released: December 13, 2008

Metro Station is the debut studio album by American pop rock band Metro Station. The album was released on September 18, 2007, under Columbia/Red Ink. Four singles were released from the album; "Kelsey", "Control", "Shake It" and "Seventeen Forever". The group completed recording the album in July 2007.

The album was released in the UK on March 30, 2009. The version of the album released in the UK contains 2 exclusive bonus tracks including a brand new track, "After the Fall". The first UK single, "Shake It", was released a week before, on March 23, 2009.

== Background ==
In 2005, Mason Musso and Trace Cyrus agreed to meet on the set of Hannah Montana, which starred Mason's brother, Mitchel, and Trace's sister, Miley as well as his father Billy Ray. Sharing musical interests, they decided to form a band. Shortly thereafter, Cyrus recruited Blake Healy from Synthetic Joy and the Bum Out Eternal as a keyboardist, synthesist, and bassist. The group released the song "Seventeen Forever" on MySpace in 2006, topping the MySpace Music's Unsigned Bands chart and garnered the attention of drummer Anthony Improgo, who joined the band. In late 2006, the group signed with Columbia/Red Ink after an intern at Red Ink discovered the band while perusing the website's music pages.

The group headed to New York City to record their debut studio album. It was produced by S*A*M and Sluggo, Joshua Cain and Justin Pierre. The band has cited inspiration from The Postal Service, Forever The Sickest Kids and The Killers when making the album.

== Singles ==
"Kelsey" was released as the first single on August 7, 2007. The song peaked at number 25 in New Zealand and at number one on the Billboard Dance Singles Sales chart.

The second single, "Control", was released on December 17, 2007, but saw no commercial success. The song was released in the UK in the spring of 2009.

"Shake It" was released as the third single from the album and was serviced to alternative radio on April 1, 2008. The song peaked at number 10 on the Billboard Hot 100 and reached the top 10 in multiple countries including Canada, Australia and the UK. The single has sold 1.2 million copies and was certified 2× Platinum in the US.

The fourth and final single "Seventeen Forever" was released on December 13, 2008. It peaked at number 42 on the Billboard Hot 100 and was certified gold in the US.

== Critical reception ==
Professional ratings
Review scores
Source	Rating
AbsolutePunk	(7.8/10)
AllMusic	2.5/5 stars
AltSounds	(43%)
Melodic	3.5/5 stars
NME	2/5 stars
Rock Louder	2/5 stars

The album was met with mixed reviews from music critics. Andrew Leahey from AllMusic gave the album a 2.5 out of 5 star rating. Criticizing the album, he stated, "not much exists beneath the polished sheen of teenaged lyrics and electronica-lite." However, he praised keyboardist Blake Healy's work as he remarked, "he is the band's secret weapon, supporting his two frontmen with enough bubbling synth to keep the ship float." NME gave the album a 2 out of 5 star rating, and complimented the songs "Shake It" and "California" as "standout moments." Nat Morris of AltSounds felt that the first half of the album were poor, but stated "from track 6 onwards the album turns decidedly upwards." John Webber of Rock Louder remarked, "This record, for all intents and purposes, is a well produced pop record that does nothing to bring disrepute to the fact that the Cyrus family can hold their own in an ever so fickle industry, and with the right team behind them, they could be absolutely massive."

Joe DeAndrea of AbsolutePunk gave a positive review stating, "This album proves that this isn't just a band that'll write one popular song and disappear from the scene in a couple of years. They have talent, they're young, and they'll keep getting better." DeAndrea also compared the group to Panic! at the Disco for their ability at "writing fun, catchy tunes." Kaj Roth of Melodic noted, "there are plenty of 80's vibes over this album but still with a modern touch - this is what you get if you mix The Cure with Fountains of Wayne." Kendal Gapinski of Lancaster Online stated, "The entire CD sounds like a block party in the middle of summer. Songs like 'California' and 'True to Me' keep the album upbeat. Mixed in are slower songs, with more sentimental lyrics, like 'Now That We're Done'. While not an intellectual album, the songs represent the quintessential teen. It's an album for teens, by teens. Heartbreak, love and just having a good time are the central themes."

== Commercial performance ==
The album debuted at number 189 on the US Billboard 200 and reached number 39 as its highest position on chart. The album also peaked at number one on the Top Dance/Electronic Albums chart. The album reached the Billboard 200 year-end chart at number 182 in 2008 and the Top Dance/Electronic Albums year-end chart at number two. That same year, the album sold 87,000 copies. Since, it has sold approximately 400,000 copies in the United States.

== Track listing ==
All tracks are written by Metro Station, except "True to Me" by Metro Station, Sam Hollander and Dave Katz.

No.	Title	Length
1.	"Seventeen Forever"	2:54
2.	"Control"	3:20
3.	"Kelsey"	3:37
4.	"Shake It"	2:59
5.	"Wish We Were Older"	2:55
6.	"Now that We're Done"	3:28
7.	"True to Me"	2:52
8.	"Tell Me What to Do"	3:09
9.	"California"	2:42
10.	"Disco"	2:41
Total length:		30:56

UK bonus tracks
No.	Title	Length
11.	"After the Fall"	2:58
12.	"Shake It" (The Lindbergh Palace Remix)	6:25
Total length:		40:19

Japan bonus tracks
No.	Title	Length
11.	"Comin' Around"	2:41
12.	"Shake It" (The Lindbergh Palace Remix)	6:25
Total length:		40:02

Deluxe edition
No.	Title	Length
11.	"Seventeen Forever" (acoustic version)	1:54
12.	"Kelsey" (acoustic version)	3:28
13.	"Shake It" (Lenny B Remix – extended version)	7:15
Total length:		43:33

== Personnel ==
Credits for Metro Station adapted from AllMusic.

Metro Station

- Trace Cyrus – lead guitar, vocals
- Blake Healy – synthesizer, beats
- Anthony Improgo – drums
- Mason Musso – vocals, rhythm guitar

Additional musicians

- Joshua Cain – bass, guitar
- Ghost of Harlem – bass
- Sean Gould – guitar
- Justin Pierre – guitar, backing vocals

Production

- Ed Ackerson – engineer
- Arjun Agerwala – engineer
- Will Brierre – assistant engineer
- Joshua Cain – producer
- Julian Gilbert – photography
- Sean Gould – engineer
- Matt Govaere – art direction
- Blake Healy – programming
- Sam Hollander – composer
- Maureen Kenny – A&R
- Mark Needham – mixing
- Justin Pierre – producer
- Scott Riebling – engineer
- S*A*M and Sluggo – producer

== Charts ==
=== Weekly charts ===
Weekly chart performance for Metro Station
Chart (2008–2009)	Peak position
Australian Albums (ARIA)	17
Austrian Albums (Ö3 Austria)	29
Belgian Albums (Ultratop Flanders)	52
Belgian Alternative Albums (Ultratop Flanders)	25
Belgian Albums (Ultratop Wallonia)	88
Canadian Albums (Billboard)	31
Dutch Albums (Album Top 100)	100
French Albums (SNEP)	100
German Albums (Offizielle Top 100)	27
Irish Albums (IRMA)	36
Italian Albums (FIMI)	33
Japanese Albums (Oricon)	74
New Zealand Albums (RMNZ)	39
Scottish Albums (Official Charts)	31
Swiss Albums (Schweizer Hitparade)	88
UK Albums (Official Charts)	35
US Billboard 200	39
US Top Dance Albums (Billboard)	1
US Top Rock Albums (Billboard)	15

=== Year-end charts ===
Year-end chart performance for Metro Station
Chart (2008)	Rank
US Billboard 200	182
US Top Dance/Electronic Albums (Billboard)	2
Chart (2009)	Rank
US Top Dance/Electronic Albums (Billboard)	11

== Certifications ==
Certifications for Metro Station
Region	Certification	Certified units/sales
Canada (Music Canada)	Gold	50,000^{^}
New Zealand (RMNZ)	Gold	7,500^{‡}
^{^} Shipments figures based on certification alone.^{‡} Sales+streaming figures based on certification alone.

== Release history ==
Release dates and formats for Metro Station
Region	Date	Format(s)	Label	Ref.
United States	September 18, 2007	CD	Columbia/Red Ink	
Various	September 18, 2007	Digital download	Sony Music	
Australia	August 9, 2008	CD	Columbia/Red Ink; Sony	
South Korea	August 9, 2008	CD	Columbia/Red Ink; Sony	
United States	March 17, 2009	LP	Columbia/Red Ink	
Poland	March 30, 2009	CD	Columbia/Red Ink	
United Kingdom	March 30, 2009	CD	Columbia/Red Ink	
Japan	May 27, 2009	CD	Sony Music	
Various	April 20, 2023	Vinyl	Field Day	
