= Shake It =

2008 single by Metro Station

Single by Metro Station

from the album Metro Station
- B-side: "Comin' Around"
- Released: April 1, 2008
- Genre: Emo; neon pop; synth-pop
- Length: 2:59
- Label: Columbia
- Songwriters: Trace Cyrus; Mason Musso; Blake Healy; Anthony Improgo
- Producer: S*A*M and Sluggo

Metro Station singles chronology
"Control" (2008)	"Shake It" (2008)	"Seventeen Forever" (2008)

Music video
- "Shake It" on YouTube

"Shake It" is a song by American pop rock band Metro Station, released on April 1, 2008, as the third single from their 2007 self-titled debut studio album. It was also released as their debut single in the United Kingdom on March 23, 2009.

"Shake It" was the band's first charting song, peaking at number ten on the Billboard Hot 100 in June 2008. Outside of the United States, "Shake It" peaked within the top ten of the charts in Australia, Austria, Canada, Germany, Ireland, Japan, New Zealand, and the United Kingdom. The song was certified gold by the Recording Industry Association of America (RIAA) on June 13, 2008, and later platinum that year, until finally reaching 2× platinum status at the end of January 2009. The song has sold over 1.2 million copies in the US and over 4 million copies worldwide.

== Composition ==
"Shake It" was written by Mason Musso, Trace Cyrus, Anthony Improgo and Blake Healy, while production was handled by S*A*M and Sluggo. The song was written in the key of E major with a BPM count of 150, but Metro Station plays the song in D major for live performances. Lyrically, the song has sexual innuendos and is about sex.

== Critical reception ==
Professional ratings
Review scores
Source	Rating
About.com	3.5/5 stars
AltSounds	(60%)

"Shake It" was generally well received by music critics. Nick Levine of Digital Spy stated, "everything about this track - the fairly standard verses, the weedy vocals, the rather tedious lyrics - is passable at best. Except, crucially, for the chorus, which is big, chanty and as easy to resist as a Krispy Kreme donut being dangled down on a rope in front of your PC." Bill Lamb of About.com noted how the track "has a distinctly 80's pop vibe with a bass and keyboard foundation strongly reminiscent of the Cars. The sound of the vocals here drips the possibility of salacious intent, courtesy of Trace Cyrus, but ultimately the lyrics themselves are filled with rather silly schoolboy come-ons. Despite a certain immaturity in the words, the sound itself is likely to lure you out on to the dancefloor."

Seventeen Magazine called the track, "the perfect summer fun tune." AltSounds stated that the track, "gets in your head ridiculously easily." The song has garnered over 110 million streams on Spotify.

== Music video ==
The music video for the song "Shake It" was inspired by fans who created their own versions of the video, 63 of which the band posted as a playlist on the band's YouTube account. The official music video was released on June 5, 2008, and was directed by Josh Forbes. The band has commented that the final product was based on the cult film The Warriors, with rival dance crews in place of gangs. MTV calls the video, "the musical equivalent of Snakes on a Plane."

The video features the four band members as they enter the Los Angeles Theatre. Once inside the theatre, the band performs the song while various dancers compete against each other around the band members. Cameos are made by online celebrity Jeffree Star and vocalist/guitarist Trace Cyrus' ex-girlfriend Hanna Beth as audience members watching the dancers perform. The video ends with the band and everyone else being forced to exit the theatre by the police.

== Awards and nominations ==
Awards and nominations for "Shake It"
Year	Organization	Award	Result	Ref(s)
2008	Australian Kids' Choice Awards	Favourite Song of the Year	Won	
2009	Los Premios MTV	Best Ringtone of the Year	Nominated	

=== Accolades ===
Accolades for "Shake It"
Publication	Country	Accolade	Year	Rank	Ref.
About.com	United States	Top 100 Songs of 2008	2008	41	
ALTop 20	United States	Top 20 Songs of 2008	2008	2	

== Track listings ==
Digital single
No.	Title	Length
1.	"Shake It"	2:59

CD single
No.	Title	Length
1.	"Shake It"	3:03
2.	"Comin' Around"	2:40

UK CD single
No.	Title	Length
1.	"Shake It" (radio mix)	3:04
2.	"Shake It" (Lenny B Remix - extended version)	7:15
3.	"Comin' Around"	2:40

Digital Remix single
No.	Title	Length
1.	"Shake It" (The Lindbergh Palace Remix)	6:25
2.	"Shake It" (Lenny B Remix)	3:22

== Charts ==
=== Weekly charts ===
Weekly chart performance for "Shake It"
Chart (2008–2009)	Peak position
Australia (ARIA)	2
Austria (Ö3 Austria Top 40)	9
Belgium (Ultratop 50 Flanders)	17
Belgium (Ultratip Bubbling Under Wallonia)	3
Bulgaria (IFPI)	12
Canada Hot 100 (Billboard)	4
Canada CHR/Top 40 (Billboard)	6
Canada Hot AC (Billboard)	5
Czech Republic Airplay (ČNS IFPI)	71
Europe (European Hot 100 Singles)	8
Finland (Suomen virallinen lista)	22
Germany (GfK)	9
Hungary (Rádiós Top 40)	11
Ireland (IRMA)	4
Japan (Japan Hot 100)	8
Latvia (EHR)	20
Lithuania (EHR)	8
Mexico Anglo (Monitor Latino)	10
Netherlands (Dutch Top 40)	22
Netherlands (Single Top 100)	39
New Zealand (Recorded Music NZ)	9
Portugal (AFP)	45
Scottish Singles Sales (Official Charts)	15
Singapore Airplay (Mediacorp)	2
Slovakia Airplay (ČNS IFPI)	15
Sweden (Sverigetopplistan)	55
Switzerland (Schweizer Hitparade)	25
UK Singles (Official Charts)	6
US Billboard Hot 100	10
US Adult Pop Airplay (Billboard)	13
US Dance/Mix Show Airplay (Billboard)	17
US Pop Airplay (Billboard)	4

=== Year-end charts ===
2008 year-end chart performance for "Shake It"
Chart (2008)	Position
Australia (ARIA)	11
Canada (Canadian Hot 100)	20
Canada CHR/Top 40 (Billboard)	16
New Zealand (RIANZ)	40
Singapore Airplay (Mediacorp)	21
US Billboard Hot 100	32
US Adult Top 40 (Billboard)	40
US Mainstream Top 40 (Billboard)	18

2009 year-end chart performance for "Shake It"
Chart (2009)	Position
Austria (Ö3 Austria Top 40)	54
Belgium (Ultratop 50 Flanders)	80
Germany (Media Control GfK)	41
Hungary (Rádiós Top 40)	47
Japan (Japan Hot 100)	94
Japan Radio Songs (Billboard Japan)	53
Latvia (European Hit Radio)	78
Netherlands (Dutch Top 40)	111
UK Singles (OCC)	55

=== Decade-end charts ===
Decade-end chart performance for "Shake It"
Chart (2000–2009)	Position
Australia (ARIA)	38

== Certifications ==
Certifications for "Shake It"
Region	Certification	Certified units/sales
Australia (ARIA)	2× Platinum	140,000^{^}
Canada (Music Canada)	3× Platinum	120,000^{*}
Germany (BVMI)	Gold	150,000^{‡}
New Zealand (RMNZ)	2× Platinum	60,000^{‡}
United Kingdom (BPI)	Platinum	600,000^{‡}
United States (RIAA)	2× Platinum	2,000,000^{^}
Ringtone / Mastertone
Canada (Music Canada) Ringtone	Platinum	40,000^{*}
United States (RIAA) Mastertone	Gold	500,000^{*}
^{*} Sales figures based on certification alone.^{^} Shipments figures based on certification alone.^{‡} Sales+streaming figures based on certification alone.

== Release history ==
Release dates and formats for "Shake It"
Region	Version	Date	Format	Label	Ref.
United States	Original	April 1, 2008	Contemporary hit radio	Columbia	
Various	Remixes	August 12, 2008	Digital download	Columbia	
United Kingdom	Original	August 9, 2008	Digital download	Columbia	
Australia	Original	January 9, 2009	Digital download	Sony	
New Zealand	Original	January 9, 2009	Digital download	Sony	
United Kingdom	Original	March 23, 2009	CD	Columbia	

== Use in media ==
- In the soundtrack of The House Bunny and on So You Think You Can Dance Canada.
- On the evening of April 7, 2008, Disney Channel had a bump that said: Shake It [Metro Station].
- It appeared on the season eight premiere of American Idol.
- It is also featured as a downloadable song for the Xbox 360 karaoke game, Lips.
- It was covered by a Portuguese boy band to be used in Sweet Strawberries (original title: Morangos Com Açúcar) season 7 soundtrack.
- The song was featured in 90210 when Annie and Ty were on a date in San Francisco.
- The song was featured in the episode "All About Appearances" from the series Privileged.
- The song was played during the opening of the episode "When Cougars Attack" of the show The Whole Truth, which first aired on October 27, 2010.
- The song is featured in the credits of the "Small is Different" episode on DragonflyTV.
- The song was featured on a television commercial for Schwarzkopf's Live Colour XXL Shake It Up Foam in the United Kingdom. The commercial first aired on British commercial television networks in December 2011.
- The song accompanied the Fastrack commercials for watches in India. The commercial first aired on Indian commercial television networks in October 2013.
- The song is frequently used by social media star Lenarr Young as the music for one of his characters named Zac.
- The song can be heard in the Grey's Anatomy spin-off show Private Practice in season 4, episode 12 as the first song Bizzy and Susan dance to after getting married.
