= Gold (Metro Station EP) =

EP by Metro Station
- Released: October 14, 2014
- Recorded: 2013–2014
- Genres: Pop; pop rock; electropop
- Length: 16:39
- Label: Metro Station Music

Metro Station chronology
Middle of the Night (EP) (2013)	Gold (2014)	Savior (2015)

Singles from Gold
- 1. "Love & War" Released: August 12, 2014; 2. "She Likes Girls" Released: September 9, 2014

Gold is an EP by American pop rock band Metro Station, released independently on October 14, 2014. The EP was made available for streaming exclusively via Billboard magazine on October 8, 2014. It was the band's first release after Trace Cyrus' return to the group in 2014.

== Background ==
Gold was recorded between 2013 and 2014 with roughly 30 songs recorded before the band finalized the 5 tracks for the EP. Trace Cyrus said that the EP has a "more mature sound." "Love & War" was released on August 12, 2014, as the lead single along with an accompanying music video. "She Likes Girls" was released on September 9, 2014, as the second single. Speaking about the song, Cyrus said, "It's something a little different for us to write about. We definitely haven't written about something this risqué, I don't think." Mason Musso added, "I just thought it was an interesting idea and I've definitely heard of that scenario before. I just thought it really worked." The music video was released on October 31, 2014.

The group went on a co-headlining tour with the Ready Set in 2014 called "The Outsiders Tour" with supporting acts from the Downtown Fiction and Against the Current.

== Critical reception ==
Professional ratings
Review scores
Source	Rating
idobi Radio	6/10 stars
Rock Sound	6/10 stars

The EP was received with mixed reviews. Alyson Stokes of idobi Radio gave the album a 6/10 stars. She states, "Gold is great by Metro Station standards and serves as a promising step forward for the band, but there’s definitely room for more variety." She ends off remarking, "Gold ups the ante for Metro Station as a band, but overall boasts nothing more than good dance tracks. Andy Biddulph of Rock Sound magazine calls the EP, "half-decent, half teeth-grindingly awful."

== Track listing ==
All tracks are written by Trace Cyrus and Mason Musso.

No.	Title	Length
1.	"Love & War"	3:04
2.	"She Likes Girls"	3:57
3.	"Gold"	3:29
4.	"Forever Young" (featuring The Ready Set)	2:47
5.	"Play It Cool"	3:22
Total length:		16:39

== Personnel ==
Credits for Gold adapted from AllMusic.

Metro Station

- Trace Cyrus – vocals, lead guitar, keyboards, bass guitar
- Mason Musso – vocals, keyboards, rhythm guitar, synthesizers

Additional musicians

- Spencer Steffan – drums, percussion, backing vocals
- The Ready Set – featured artist
