= Brainstorm (EP) =

EP by Mitchel Musso
- Released: November 22, 2010
- Recorded: 2010
- Genre: Pop; dance-pop
- Length: 26:04
- Label: 717
- Producer: Mitchel Musso, Mason Musso, Dan Dymtrow

Mitchel Musso chronology
Mitchel Musso (2009)	Brainstorm (2010)	Ghost (2022)

Singles from Brainstorm
- 1. "Get Away" Released: October 29, 2010; 2. "Celebrate" Released: December 15, 2010

Brainstorm is the second major release by Mitchel Musso. It was released on November 22, 2010, by 717 Records. Musso worked with his brother, Mason Musso, for the project.

== Track listing ==
No.	Title	Writer(s)	Producer(s)	Length
1.	"Get Away"	Mitchel Musso, Mason Musso, PJ Bianco, Peter Hanna	Bianco	3:35
2.	"Got Your Heart"	Musso, Mason Musso, Jon Ketchum, Isaiah Vest, Dustin Belt	Vest	3:05
3.	"Celebrate"	Musso, Mason Musso, busbee	Mitchel Musso, Dan Dymtrow, Sam Musso	3:08
4.	"You Got Me Hooked"	Musso, Tim Myers	Michael “Smidi” Smith	2:59
5.	"Just Go"	Musso, A. Jay Popoff, Jeremy Popoff	Musso, Carlos de la Garza	3:16
6.	"Empty"	Musso, Hanna	Musso	3:47
7.	"Come Back My Love"	Musso, Robbie Nevil, Steve Diamond	Nevil, Diamond	2:49
8.	"Open the Door"	Musso, Michael Raphael	Raphael	3:25
Total length:				26:04
