= Unhitched =

- The show's cast members on set. From left to right: Johnny Sneed, Rashida Jones, Craig Bierko and Shaun Majumder
- Genre: Sitcom
- Created by: Mike Bernier; Chris Pappas
- Starring: Craig Bierko; Rashida Jones; Shaun Majumder; Johnny Sneed
- Opening theme: "Hey" by Gillmor
- Composer: John Nordstrom
- Country of origin: United States
- Original language: English
- No. of seasons: 1
- No. of episodes: 6

Production
- Executive producers: Bobby Farrelly; Peter Farrelly; Brad Johnson; Bradley Thomas; Mike Sikowitz
- Camera setup: Single-camera
- Running time: 22 minutes
- Production companies: Watson Pond Productions; Conundrum Entertainment; 20th Century Fox Television

Original release
- Network: Fox
- Release: March 2 – March 30, 2008

Unhitched (previously known as The Rules for Starting Over) is an American sitcom that aired as a mid-season replacement on Fox from March 2 to 30, 2008. The series was originally scheduled to premiere at 9:30 p.m. ET, but aired 30 minutes later due to the runover of NASCAR. The show was created by Mike Bernier and Chris Pappas. Bobby Farrelly, Peter Farrelly and Mike Sikowitz served as executive producers alongside Brad Johnson and Bradley Thomas, with Katy McCaffrey producing. The pilot was directed by Bobby and Peter Farrelly. The show revolved around a group of newly single friends learning the lessons of starting over in their 30s.

On May 5, 2008, Fox cancelled the series after one season.

== Plot summary ==
From the creatively fruitful minds of the Farrelly Brothers comes a single camera comedy, set in Boston, about a group of newly single friends learning the painful lessons of starting over in their 30s. They'd all love to get married and remarried, if they could just find their true loves. Jack "Gator" Gately is a charismatic, optimistic leader who never expected to be single again. But now that he is, he's determined to make the best of it. He's going to sift through all the bruised, damaged, occasionally psychotic fruit until he finds "the one." Joining Gator in bachelorhood redux is his party animal best friend Tommy. The founder and brewmaster of an upstart microbrewery, Tommy has a voracious appetite for food, beer and women. He falls in love easily and always disastrously, yet truly hopes his new love will be "the one." Dr. Freddy Sahgal has seen some pretty strange stuff during his years as a successful surgeon, but he's never seen any of it through the eyes of a single man. Probably the least equipped of the group to handle this unexpected life change is Dr. Freddy, who can execute a triple bypass in his sleep, but is all thumbs when it comes to the opposite sex. Rounding out the group is Kate, a smart, successful attorney who handled Gator and Freddy's divorces. Having just turned 30, Kate finds herself dumped after a seven-year engagement. She reluctantly joins the guys in negotiating the treacherous waters of dating. Kate owns the brownstone next to Gator's. Over time, this pair may find that "the one" is just a brick wall away.

== Cast ==
- Craig Bierko as Jack "Gator" Gately
- Rashida Jones as Katherine "Kate" Frankola
- Shaun Majumder as Dr. Frederick "Freddy" Sahgal
- Johnny Sneed as Thomas "Tommy" Leegan

== Production ==
Produced by 20th Century Fox Television, Conundrum Entertainment and Watson Pond Productions, the series was greenlit and given a six-episode order on May 11, 2007. The pilot aired on Foxtel in Australia in 2008, one day after its original airdate in the United States, and on Network Ten later in the year. It aired on FX in the United Kingdom. It also aired on TV6 in Sweden. The theme song for the show is a song called "Hey!" by the band Gillmor, and can be found on their Counting the Days album.

== Episodes ==
No.	Title	Directed by	Written by	Original release date	Prod. code
1	"Pilot"	Peter Farrelly & Bobby Farrelly	Story by : Mike Bernier & Chris Pappas; Teleplay by : Mike Bernier & Chris Pappas & Kevin Barnett	March 2, 2008	1ANL79
Jack "Gator" Gately finds himself ill-prepared to re-enter the dating scene as a blind date goes terribly. His friend and neighbor Kate finds big things come in small packages when she dates an employee of the Boston Celtics. Indian-born Dr. Freddy learns that love isn't cheap with the woman of your dreams.
2	"Woman Marries Horse"	John Blanchard	Story by : Kevin Barnett; Teleplay by : Chris Pappas & Mike Bernier	March 9, 2008	1ANL01
Gator is hung up on his new girlfriend's minor physical flaw, leading Tommy to take drastic measures. Freddy befriends a bouncer; Kate dates a musician whose talents are not what they seem.
3	"Conjoined Twins Pitch No-Hitter"	John Blanchard	Mike Sikowitz	March 16, 2008	1ANL02
Gator tries to relive his college drinking and glory days when he and Freddy meet two attractive Icelandic women. Kate drags Tommy to a children's birthday party when she learns her ex will be there.
4	"Mardi Gras Croc Attack"	Linda Mendoza	Mike Sikowitz	March 23, 2008	1ANL05
Gator joins Kate's boxing gym only to be challenged by a woman in the ring, and Kate confronts a co-worker who lets it all hang out in the locker room. Freddy teaches Tommy tantric sex methods.
5	"Yorkshire Terrier Sucked into the Internet"	Arlene Sanford	Kristin Newman	March 23, 2008	1ANL03
Gator and Kate are both handicapped when Kate begins dating his new assistant. Freddy reconnects with his ex when he attempts online dating. Tommy finds love at jury duty.
6	"Pole-Dancing Toddler"	John Blanchard	Jonathan Green & Gabe Miller	March 30, 2008	1ANL04
Gator woos his new neighbor, an animal rights activist, while Kate dates an exterminator. Tommy teaches Freddy how to drive.

== U.S. Nielsen ratings ==
In the following summary, "rating" is the percentage of all households with televisions that tuned to the show, and "share" is the percentage of all televisions in use at that time that are tuned in. "18-49" is the percentage of all adults aged 18–49 tuned into the show. "Viewers" are the number of viewers, in million, watching at the time. "Rank" how well the show did compared to other TV shows aired that week.

#	Episode	Air Date	Timeslot	Rating	Share	18–49	Viewers	Weekly Rank
1	"Pilot"	March 2, 2008	10:00 P.M.	3.8	6	2.6/6 (#2)	5.77 (#4)	N/A
2	"Woman Marries Heart"	March 9, 2008	9:30 P.M.	3.2	5	2.6/6 (#2)	5.21 (#4)	#71
3	"Conjoined Twins Pitch No-Hitter"	March 16, 2008	9:30 P.M.	2.9	4	2.3/6 (#2)	4.43 (#4)	#75
4	"Mardi Gras Croc Attack"	March 23, 2008	8:30 P.M.	2.1	4	1.5/4 (#3)	3.21 (#4)	#75
5	"Yorkshire Terrier Sucked Into the Internet"	March 23, 2008	9:30 P.M.	2.0	3	1.5/4 (#4)	3.11 (#4)	#77
6	"Pole Dancing Toddler"	March 30, 2008	9:30 P.M.	2.6	4	2.1/5 (#3)	4.19 (#4)	#71

+ The premiere episode aired at 10pm due to a late-ending NASCAR race.
