= Hey (Mitchel Musso song) =

Single by Mitchel Musso

from the album Mitchel Musso
- Released: May 15, 2009
- Recorded: 2008–2009
- Genre: Alternative rock; power pop
- Length: 3:01
- Label: Walt Disney
- Songwriters: Tim Pagnotta; Ryan Gillmor
- Producer: Brian Malouf

Mitchel Musso singles chronology
"Hey" (2009)	"Shout It" (2009)

"Hey" is the debut single by American actor and singer Mitchel Musso. Originally sung by the band Gilmor (led by singer Ryan Gillmor), it was released as the lead single from Musso's self-titled debut studio album. The song premiered on Radio Disney on May 15, 2009. A music video for the song premiered on Disney Channel the same day, May 15. It is also the singer's most successful song on both the Canadian and American charts.

== Release ==
The song was originally recorded by Ryan Gilmor and his band Gilmor as the theme song of the short-lived Farrelly brothers sitcom Unhitched starring Craig Bierko, Rashida Jones, Shaun Majumder and Johnny Sneed, about a group of 4 newly-single 30-somethings living in Boston and starting over. "Hey" premiered on Radio Disney on May 15, 2009 and reached No. 3 on the Top 30 Countdown. It is his second single from his self-titled album. It is also one of his best known songs.

== Music video ==
Mitchel Musso in the music video for a tiebreaker of "Hey" in his Hypnosis Standard.

Musso filmed a music video for the song in April 2009. The video was released on Disney Channel on the same day as the song's release, May 15, 2009. The video consists of Musso walking up a street over and over, as to "reliving" the day with many special effects used. He then goes into a performance sequence where he performs the rest of the song on the street with his band.

== Charts ==
Chart (2009)	Peak position
Canadian Hot 100	79
U.S. Billboard Hot 100	70
