= Savior (album) =

Studio album by Metro Station
- Released: June 30, 2015
- Genres: Pop; pop rock; electropop
- Length: 56:23
- Label: Metro Station Music

Metro Station chronology
Gold (2014)	Savior (2015)	Bury Me My Love (2017)

Singles from Savior
- 1. "Getting Over You" Released: June 9, 2015

Savior is the second and final studio album by American pop rock band Metro Station. It was released independently on June 30, 2015. It is the band's first full-length album since its debut self-titled album, which had been released eight years prior.

== Background ==
Trace Cyrus spoke about the second album Savior that was released 8 years after their first album Metro Station.

"It's just hard for people to give our new music a chance when you've had so much success off of your first album. Which, you know, very rarely do people have such a big hit when they're 18 years old. I've been playing those songs for years and I love those songs, but it's just hard when I feel like we've made many better songs since we got back together and people want to compare everything we do to something we made when we were 17. I wish people would be just more open-minded about what we're doing now and not so focused about what we did 10 years ago."

"Getting Over You" was released on June 9, 2015, as the lead single and features Falling in Reverse singer Ronnie Radke. "Better Than Me," "Married in Vegas" and "Used By You" were made available for streaming on June 17, 2015. Cyrus said that "Married in Vegas" was his favorite song that the group has released and the song was written in an hour. The band promoted the album with appearances at every date on the 2015 Warped Tour. The band also went on a headlining tour called the "Savior Tour" with supporting acts from Palaye Royale and the Strive.

== Track listing ==
All tracks are written by Trace Cyrus and Mason Musso.

No.	Title	Length
1.	"Savior"	2:55
2.	"Getting Over You" (featuring Ronnie Radke)	2:53
3.	"Better Than Me"	3:31
4.	"Married in Vegas"	3:35
5.	"Used By You"	3:01
6.	"Give Me Your Love"	3:07
7.	"Wake Up"	3:16
8.	"Pretty Little Liar"	3:45
9.	"Liquid Courage"	2:53
10.	"Still Party"	3:07
11.	"Get it On"	3:01
12.	"Runaway"	3:25
13.	"Deadly on the Dance Floor"	2:27
14.	"Pop Princess"	2:52
15.	"Burn With You"	2:52
16.	"Devil in Disguise"	3:09
17.	"Ride or Die"	2:56
18.	"One Night"	3:38
Total length:		56:23

== Personnel ==
Metro Station

- Trace Cyrus – vocals, lead guitar, bass guitar, synthesizer
- Mason Musso – vocals, keyboards, synthesizer, rhythm guitar
- Spencer Steffan – drums, percussion, backing vocals
