= Mitchel Musso =

American actor and singer (born 1991)

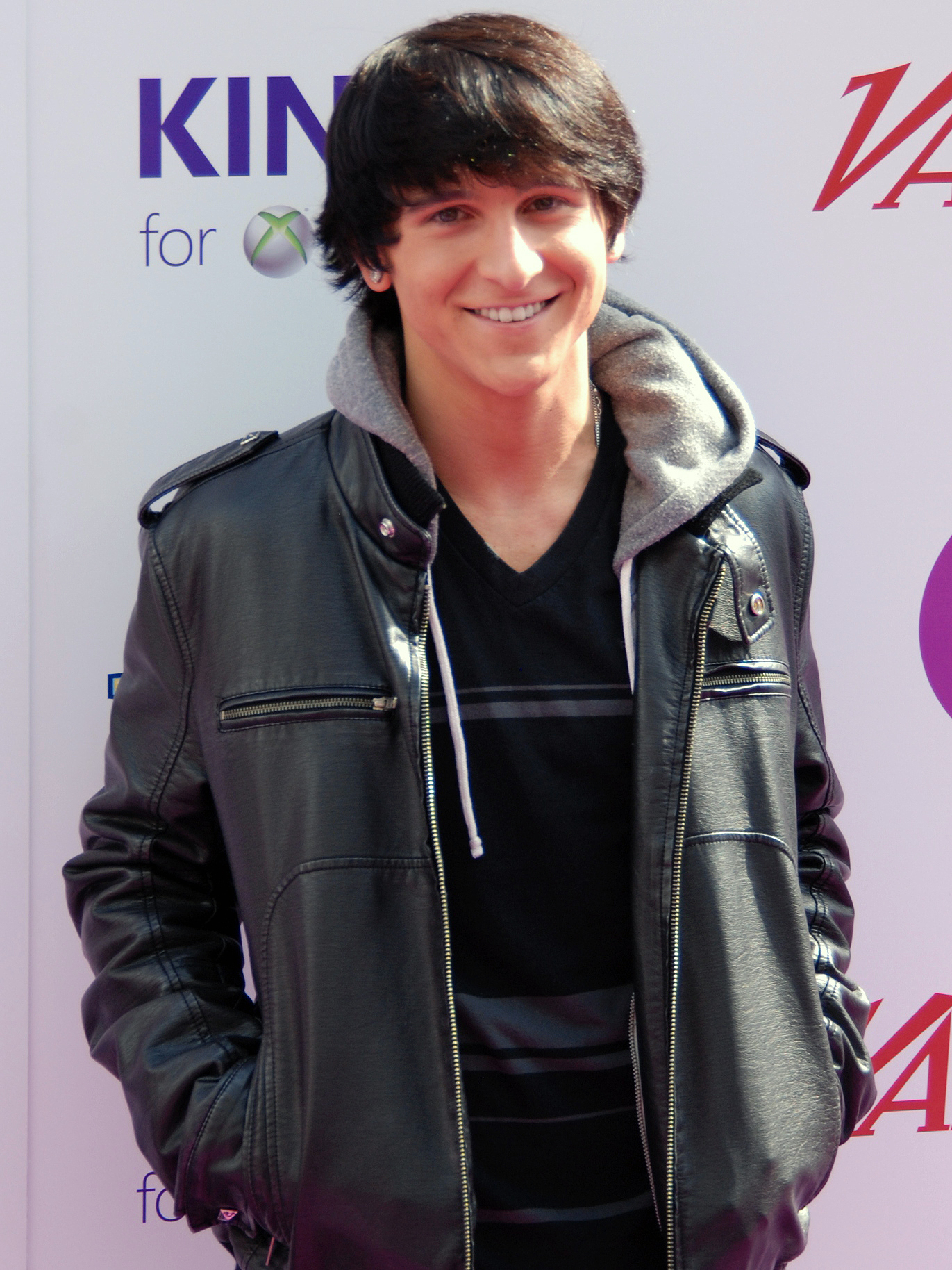
- Musso in 2010
- Born: Mitchel Tate Musso; July 9, 1991 (age 35); Garland, Texas, U.S.
- Occupations: Actor; singer
- Years active: 2002–present (actor); 2009–present (singer)
- Height: 167 cm (5 ft 6 in)
- Parents: Samuel Musso (father); Katherine Moore (mother)
- Relatives: Mason Musso (brother) Marc Musso (brother)
- Musical career
- Genres: Pop; dance-pop
- Instrument: Vocals
- Years active: 2007–present
- Labels: Walt Disney Records (2008–2009); 717 (2010); Musso Records (2022–present)

Mitchel Tate Musso (born July 9, 1991) is an American actor and singer. He is best known for his Disney Channel roles as Oliver Oken in Hannah Montana, Jeremy Johnson in the animated series Phineas and Ferb, and his Disney XD role as King Brady on Pair of Kings as well as the host of Disney Channel's PrankStars.

He voiced DJ in the animated film, Monster House, and starred as Raymond Figg in the Disney Channel Original Movie, Life Is Ruff, released in 2005, as well as Cleatus Poole in the film Hatching Pete in 2009. Musso's self-titled debut album was released on June 2, 2009, on Walt Disney Records. The album debuted at number 19 on the Billboard 200.

== Early life ==
Musso was born in Garland, Texas, the son of Katherine (née Moore) and Samuel Musso, who were involved in community theater in Dallas, Texas. He has two brothers – the eldest, Mason Musso, who sang lead vocals in the band Metro Station, and the youngest, Marc Musso, who is also an actor. He is of Italian and English descent. He grew up in Rockwall, Texas.

== Career ==
=== Acting ===
In 2003, Mitchel made his Hollywood film debut in Secondhand Lions, alongside his brother Marc. Before Musso was cast in Secondhand Lions, he had been in several films beforehand: Am I Cursed? as Richie and The Keyman as a Cub Scout, both in 2002. Musso also starred in three episodes of King of the Hill as the voice of Bobby Hill's friend Curt in the episodes "The Powder Puff Boys" and "Bobby Rae" as well as the surfer kid in "Four Wave Intersection" in 2007.

In addition to his role as Oliver Oken in Disney Channel's Hannah Montana, Musso also voiced Jeremy Johnson in Phineas and Ferb, a boy on whom the title characters' sister, Candace (Ashley Tisdale) has a crush, before he was discharged by Disney in 2023. Other acting credits include Raymond Figg in the Disney Channel Original Movie, Life Is Ruff, the voice of Aang in the unaired version of the pilot episode of Avatar: The Last Airbender, the voice of DJ in the film Monster House, and Hannah Montana: The Movie, which was released on April 10, 2009.

He appeared in the Disney Channel Games in 2006 on the Green Team, and appeared on the Red Team in 2007 and 2008. He also appeared in the television film Walker, Texas Ranger: Trial by Fire alongside Chuck Norris and Selena Gomez. In 2008, Musso, Miley Cyrus and Billy Ray Cyrus all made "family" guest appearances in Metro Station's music video for "Seventeen Forever".

In early 2009, Musso was cast, alongside The Suite Life on Deck and House of Payne's Doc Shaw, in a new television series for Disney XD titled Pair of Kings. The series began production in March 2010, following the production of the final season of Hannah Montana in which Musso will only be a guest. The series premiered on September 10, 2010. It was announced that Musso would be the host of Disney Channel's hidden camera reality series PrankStars, which premiered on July 15, 2011.

On December 12, 2011, Disney XD renewed the series Pair of Kings for a third season. Musso did not return for the new season and, instead, he was replaced by a new character played by Adam Hicks.

=== Music ===
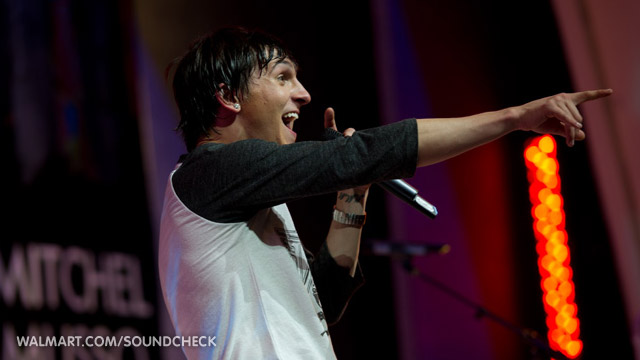
Musso in 2011

Musso sang a remixed remake of the song "Lean on Me" for the Disney film Snow Buddies; the music video is included on the DVD and the song is included on the Radio Disney Jams, Vol. 10 CD. Musso also sang the song "If I Didn't Have You" with Hannah Montana co-star Emily Osment for the Disneymania 6 CD in 2008 and sang the song Stand Out for the Disneymania 7 CD in 2010. For their 2009 Disney Channel Original Movie, Hatching Pete, Musso teamed up with co-star Tiffany Thornton, from Sonny with a Chance, to record a song called "Let It Go" that was used in the film. The two also worked on a music video for the song which was released to Disney Channel. Musso also recorded a song called "The Girl Can't Help It" for another Disney Channel Original Movie, Princess Protection Program. "Let it Go" and "The Girl Can't Help It" was featured on the Disney compilation album, Disney Channel Playlist, which was released on June 23, 2008. And sang "Livin' like Kings" on Disney XD's Pair of Kings on Disney Channel. Also in 2009, Musso collaborated on the School House Rock song "The 3 R's"; an educational song about recycling.

In a studio effort, Musso released his self-titled debut album on June 2, 2009. His debut single, "The In Crowd", a cover of a John Hampson song, premiered on Radio Disney on December 5, 2008. The song is also featured on Radio Disney Jams, Vol. 11. His second single, "Hey", was released on May 15, 2009, on Radio Disney with an accompanying music video that premiered on Disney Channel. He was the host of the Disney Channel series Prank Stars and sang the theme song.

In July and August 2009, Musso opened for Metro Station. He also launched a headlining tour in August, with KSM, as his opening act. The tour concluded September 24 in New Orleans, Louisiana. On Saturday, September 4, 2010, he put on a free concert at the Great New York State Fair's Chevy Court. One week later he put on another free show at the Utah State Fair. Musso's second release, Brainstorm, was released on November 23, 2010. He made a video for each one of his songs on the album to "Tell the whole story." His song "Celebrate" was in the radio Disney Top 3.

On September 23, 2022, after a ten-year hiatus, Musso returned to the music industry, releasing a new single, titled, "DRANK", for his upcoming mixtape, Ghost. The mixtape released on October 28, 2022.

== Personal life ==
Musso briefly dated actress Gia Mantegna, the daughter of actor Joe Mantegna, in 2009.

=== Legal issues ===
On October 17, 2011, at 3:43 a.m., Musso was pulled over in Burbank, California, failed to slow down for traffic cops, and charged with a DUI suspicion. He was approached by the police who then smelled alcohol and proceeded to give him a field sobriety test and breathalyzer. Musso, aged 20, was under the legal drinking age and blew above the legal limit of .08% blood alcohol content. His bail was set at $5,000, but he was released on account of no outstanding warrants. Musso told E! Online, that, "In becoming an adult, I have learned first hand that stepping up and taking responsibility is the best way to move forward. I am especially thankful to my family and fans for their unwavering support and encouragement. I am glad to now put this in the past."

On August 26, 2023, Musso was reportedly acting belligerent after being asked to pay for a bag of chips he had taken from a hotel food market without paying. After police arrived outside the hotel, Musso was visibly intoxicated. It was discovered that Musso allegedly had multiple outstanding warrants, and was subsequently taken into police custody in Rockwall, Texas. Musso faced charges of "public intoxication, theft (under $100), expired registration, failure to display a driver's license, and violating a promise to appear notice." In November 2023, the charges were dismissed.

== Filmography ==
=== Film ===
Year	Title	Role	Notes
2002	Am I Cursed?	Richie	Short film
2002	The Keyman	Cub Scout	
2003	Secondhand Lions	Boy	
2005	Life Is Ruff	Raymond Figg	Disney Channel Original Movie
2005	Walker, Texas Ranger: Trial by Fire	Josh Whitley	Television film
2006	Monster House	D.J.	Voice role
2009	Hatching Pete	Cleatus Poole	Disney Channel Original Movie
2009	Hannah Montana: The Movie	Oliver Oken	
2010	The Search for Santa Paws	Adult Santa Paws	Voice role
2011	Phineas and Ferb: Across the 2nd Dimension	Jeremy Johnson, Jeremy-2	Voice role
2014	Sins of Our Youth	Scott	
2015	The Sand	Mitch	
2016	Characterz	Tucker	and Creative Director
2018	Bachelor Lion	Zane Daniels	
2020	Phineas and Ferb the Movie: Candace Against the Universe	Jeremy Johnson	Voice role

=== Television ===
Year	Title	Role	Notes
2002	Avatar: The Last Airbender	Aang	Voice; episode: "Pilot"
2004	Oliver Beene	One Nad aka Walter	Episode: "Soup to Nuts"
2006–2011	Hannah Montana	Oliver Oken/Mike Standley III	Main role (seasons 1–3); guest role (season 4)
2007	Shorty McShorts' Shorts	Kevin	Voice, episode: "Mascot Prep"
2007	King of the Hill	Curt	Voice role; 3 episodes
2008–2014	Phineas and Ferb	Jeremy Johnson	Voice role (seasons 1–4)
2009	Yin Yang Yo!	Himself	Voice role; episode: "Yin! Yang! You!"
2010–2012	Pair of Kings	King Brady Parker	Main role (seasons 1–2); guest role (season 3)
2011	PrankStars	Host/Himself	6 episodes
2016–2018	Milo Murphy's Law	Wally / Jeremy Johnson	Voice role

=== Video games ===
Year	Title	Role	Notes
2006	Monster House	Dustin J. "DJ" Walters	Voice role

== Discography ==
Studio albums

- Mitchel Musso (2009)
- Ghost (2022)

Extended plays

- Brainstorm (2010)

== Awards and nominations ==
Year	Award	Category	Work	Result	Refs
2004	Young Artist Awards	Best Performance In A Feature Film – Young Actor Age Ten or Younger	Secondhand Lions (shared with Marc Musso)	Nominated	
2007	Academy of Science Fiction, Fantasy & Horror Films	Best Performance by a Younger Actor	Monster House	Nominated	
2008	Young Artist Awards	Best Young Ensemble Performance In A TV Series	Hannah Montana (shared with ensemble)	Nominated	
