= AltSounds =

Video streaming site

- Website type: Music webzine
- Owner: Chris Maguire
- Creator: Chris Maguire
- Website: altsounds.com/
- Launched: 2004; 22 years ago
- Current status: Active

AltSounds is a music video streaming site and video database. It began as an Internet publication devoted to music criticism and commentary, music news, and artist interviews. In 2015 it changed format to providing video playlists only.

In 2024, the original domain AltSounds.com became a music video database.

== History ==
The website was originally created in 2004 by editor-in-chief Chris "MUG5" Maguire. AltSounds published content from different contributors including, academics and professional journalists to career professionals and first time writers. It included news, interviews, record reviews, as well competitions.

In June 2008, the website formed a record label, Altsounds Records, signing Winch House as their first act. In November 2012, AltSounds was added to the list of ratings sources of AnyDecentMusic?. In 2015, the format of the magazine format was changed to video streaming only. In 2016, Maguire founded the creative marketing agency RIOT.
