= Trace Cyrus =

American musician (born 1989)

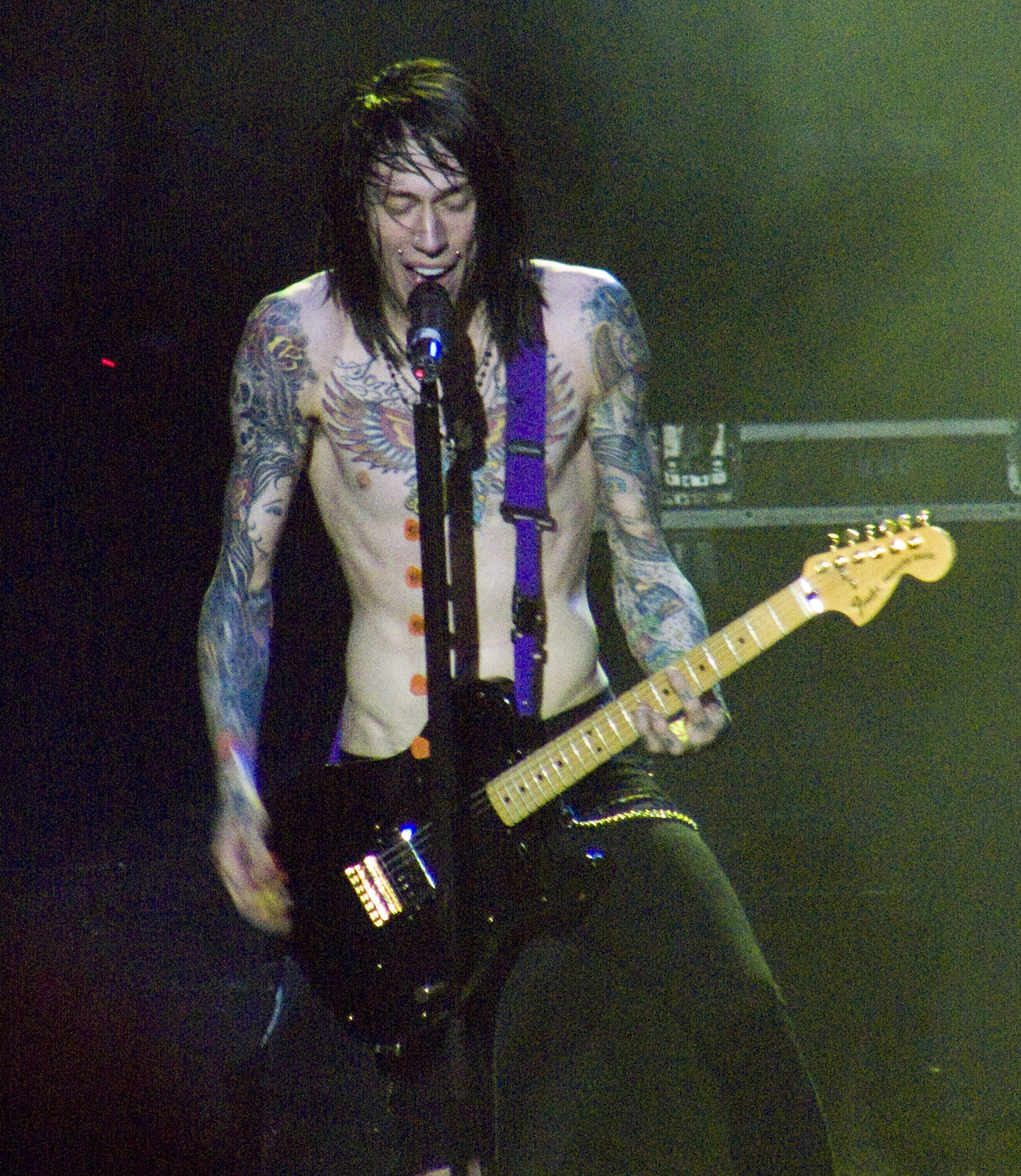
- Cyrus in 2009
- Born: Neil Timothy Helson; February 24, 1989 (age 37); Ashland, Kentucky, U.S.
- Occupation: Musician
- Years active: 2006–present
- Parent(s): Billy Ray Cyrus (father, adopted); Tish Cyrus (mother)
- Relatives: Ron Cyrus (step-grandfather); Miley Cyrus (half-sister); Noah Cyrus (half-sister); Brandi Cyrus (sister); Joseph Purcell (stepbrother)
- Musical career
- Origin: Burbank, California, U.S.
- Genres: Pop-punk; pop rock; synth-pop; electronic rock; dance-punk; dance-pop; emo
- Instruments: Vocals; guitar
- Labels: Columbia; SMHP
- Formerly of: Metro Station

Trace Dempsey Cyrus (born Neil Timothy Helson, February 24, 1989) is an American musician. The adopted son of country music singer Billy Ray Cyrus and half-brother of recording artists Miley Cyrus and Noah Cyrus, he was the backing vocalist and guitarist of the band Metro Station. In 2010, he began providing vocals and guitar in the pop rock band Ashland HIGH. He also owned the now defunct clothing company From Backseats to Bedrooms.

== Early life ==
Cyrus was born in Ashland, Kentucky, as Neil Timothy Helson on February 24, 1989. His mother is Leticia "Tish" Cyrus. His biological father is Baxter Neal Helson. He was adopted at age four by Billy Ray Cyrus, his mother's second husband, and lived with them part of the time in Thompson's Station, Tennessee. Following his adoption, his name was legally changed to Trace Dempsey Cyrus.

Cyrus spent his school holidays touring and performing with Billy Ray. He has a younger sister, Miley, who starred in the Disney Channel original television series Hannah Montana. He recorded a track with her in 2008.

In 2006, he started working at a shopping mall in Burbank, California, and dropped out of La Cañada High School.

== Career ==
=== 2006–2010: Metro Station ===
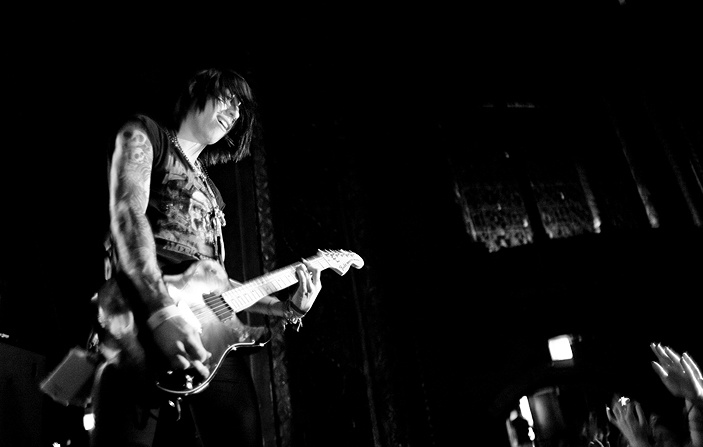
Cyrus performing in Chicago in 2008

In 2006, Cyrus co-wrote the song "Country Music Has the Blues" on Billy Ray's album Wanna Be Your Joe. The song features Loretta Lynn and George Jones. In early 2006, Cyrus started the pop-rock band Metro Station with Mason Musso, the brother of Hannah Montana cast member Mitchel. Cyrus performed with the band as a guitarist and vocalist. Columbia Records signed the band after seeing their MySpace page. The band released their self-titled debut studio album on September 18, 2007. The album peaked at number 39 on the Billboard 200 and sold 87,000 copies in the US. Their hit single, "Shake It" was released in April 2008, and peaked at number ten on the Billboard Hot 100. Cyrus left Metro Station in early 2010. Following his departure from the band, Cyrus confirmed he would be forming a new band and releasing his own music.

In 2008, Cyrus was featured on the song "Hovering" on the deluxe edition of Miley's album, Breakout. The same year, he appeared in the music video for the Billy Ray single "Somebody Said a Prayer". In 2010, he was featured in the song "Alive" for Billy Ray's band, Brother Clyde.

=== 2010–2017, 2019–2020: Ashland HIGH, return to Metro Station ===
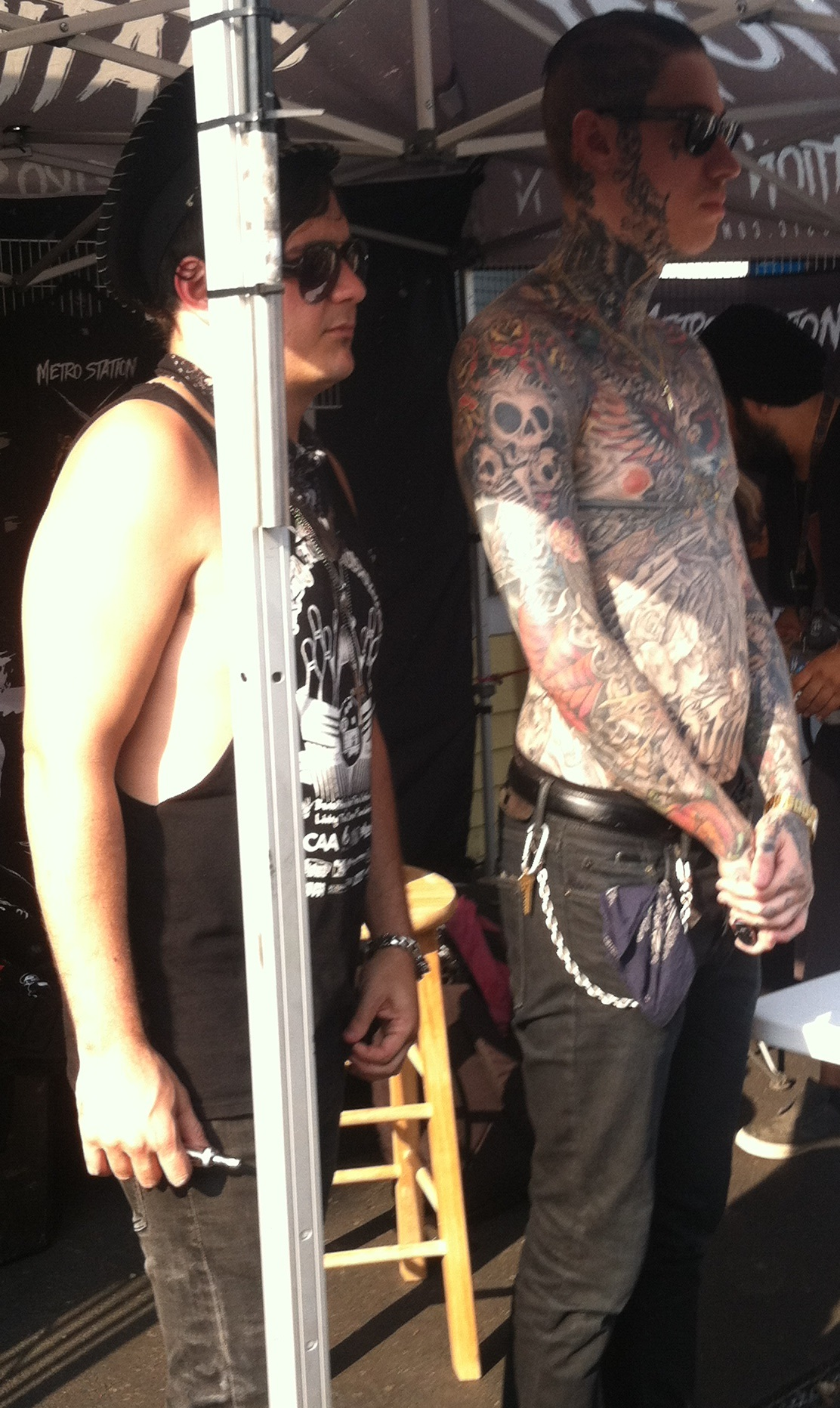
Cyrus (right) with Mason Musso in 2015 in Hartford, Connecticut, at Warped Tour

In early 2010, Cyrus formed the pop band Ashland HIGH. On January 1, 2012, Cyrus released his debut studio album under Ashland HIGH, Geronimo, for a free download. He recorded the album in his home in Los Angeles and worked with several producers from Canada in late November and cut the album in nine days. On January 3, Cyrus released a music video for his debut single, "Jealous Lover", from his first album. The group made their first live performance at Chain Reaction in Anaheim on February 24. In March 2012, Ashland HIGH joined Breathe Carolina and the Ready Set on a co-headlining US tour. Cyrus performed at The Bamboozle in May 2012. In July 2012, Cyrus released the music video for "Sippin' on Sunshine", which features an appearance from Cyrus' sister Miley. He also recorded a song with Miley titled, "Shot in the Dark", but never released the track stating, "When I feel like I've had my own success and fame because of my hard work, then I'll [release] the song with Miley, but I'm not trying to use her to get exposure or sell records." On July 26, he released the music video for "Overload". As of 2013, Ashland HIGH has released two albums, Geronimo and Drugstore Cowboy. In 2013, he was featured in a remix of the song "Dat Boi" by Millionaires.

In August 2014, Cyrus returned as a member of Metro Station. They released the EP, Gold on October 14, 2014. The band released their second studio album Savior on June 30, 2015, and toured with Never Shout Never and Falling in Reverse from 2015 to 2016. They disbanded in 2017, following their 10-Year Anniversary tour, but reunited again in 2019, and released the single "I Hate Society" in 2020.

=== 2017–present: solo career ===
In 2017, Cyrus began to release music independently and released his first single "Lights Out" that year. On February 14, 2018, Cyrus released the single, "Brenda", which is about his ex-fiancée Brenda Song. He released his first EP Killing the Pain on September 24, 2021. In 2022, he released the single "Pray at Night" and confirmed he was finishing up his debut studio album. On June 28, 2024, Cyrus returned to music and released the single, "Cowgirl Ride". The song marks a shift into a country leaning sound. He released another single, "On the Run" and in January 2025, he announced a new album would be arriving later in the year.

== Personal life ==
In 2009, Cyrus dated singer Demi Lovato for a few months.

From 2010 into 2017, Cyrus had an on-and-off relationship with actress Brenda Song, to whom he was engaged in 2011.

Cyrus has many tattoos, some of which he displayed for PETA's "Ink Not Mink" anti-fur campaign in 2012.

== Discography ==
=== Extended plays ===
List of extended plays with selected details
Title	EP details
Killing the Pain	Released: September 24, 2021; Label: SMHP Records; Format: Digital download, streaming

=== Singles ===
List of singles as lead artist
Title	Year	Album
"Lights Out"	2017	Non-album singles
"Don't Belong Together"	2017	Non-album singles
"Moving On"	2017	Non-album singles
"Wasted on Love"	2017	Non-album singles
"Prescriptions"	2018	Non-album singles
"Brenda"	2018	Non-album singles
"Summer" (featuring DreamDoll)	2018	Non-album singles
"Give My Heart To You" (featuring Tay)	2018	Non-album singles
"Let's Run Away"	2018	Non-album singles
"Red Rose Petals"	2019	Non-album singles
"Fame and the Money"	2019	Non-album singles
"Forever"	2019	Non-album singles
"Separated"	2019	Non-album singles
"Sunglasses"	2019	Non-album singles
"Missed Calls"	2019	Non-album singles
"Next to You"	2019	Non-album singles
"Dark Road" (featuring Tay)	2020	Non-album singles
"Nighttime" (featuring Lil Johnnie)	2020	Non-album singles
"Typical Suspect"	2021	Non-album singles
"Taylor"	2021	Non-album singles
"The Lighthouse"	2021	Non-album singles
"Pray at Night"	2022	Non-album singles
"Cowgirl Ride" (featuring Kaylee Rose)	2024	TBA
"On the Run"	2024	TBA

List of singles as featured artist
Title	Year	Album
"Winter" (Zach Van Dyck featuring Trace Cyrus)	2017	Non-album single
"Fade Away" (Lil Johnnie featuring Trace Cyrus)	2019	Numb
"Found One" (Jordan York featuring Trace Cyrus)	2022	Non-album single
