= S*A*M and Sluggo =

American songwriter

- Origin: New York City, New York, United States
- Genres: Pop
- Years active: 2005–2012
- Past members: Sam "S*A*M" Hollander; Dave "Sluggo" Katz

S*A*M and Sluggo was an American record production and songwriting team, composed of Sam Hollander and Dave "Sluggo" Katz.

Formed in 2005, the duo first collaborated on the popular theme song "Snakes on a Plane (Bring It)" by Cobra Starship, from the 2006 film Snakes on a Plane. Based in Manhattan, the duo played an important role in the history of emo, helping to transform the musical genre from its underground roots to a polished, mainstream sound in the mid-2000s. They were known for their collaborations with Metro Station, Boys Like Girls, We the Kings, Good Charlotte, Train, Coheed and Cambria, Katy Perry and Gym Class Heroes.

S*A*M & SLUGGO were named the 2008 Rolling Stone Hot List Producers of the Year.
