= Metro Station (band) =

American pop rock band

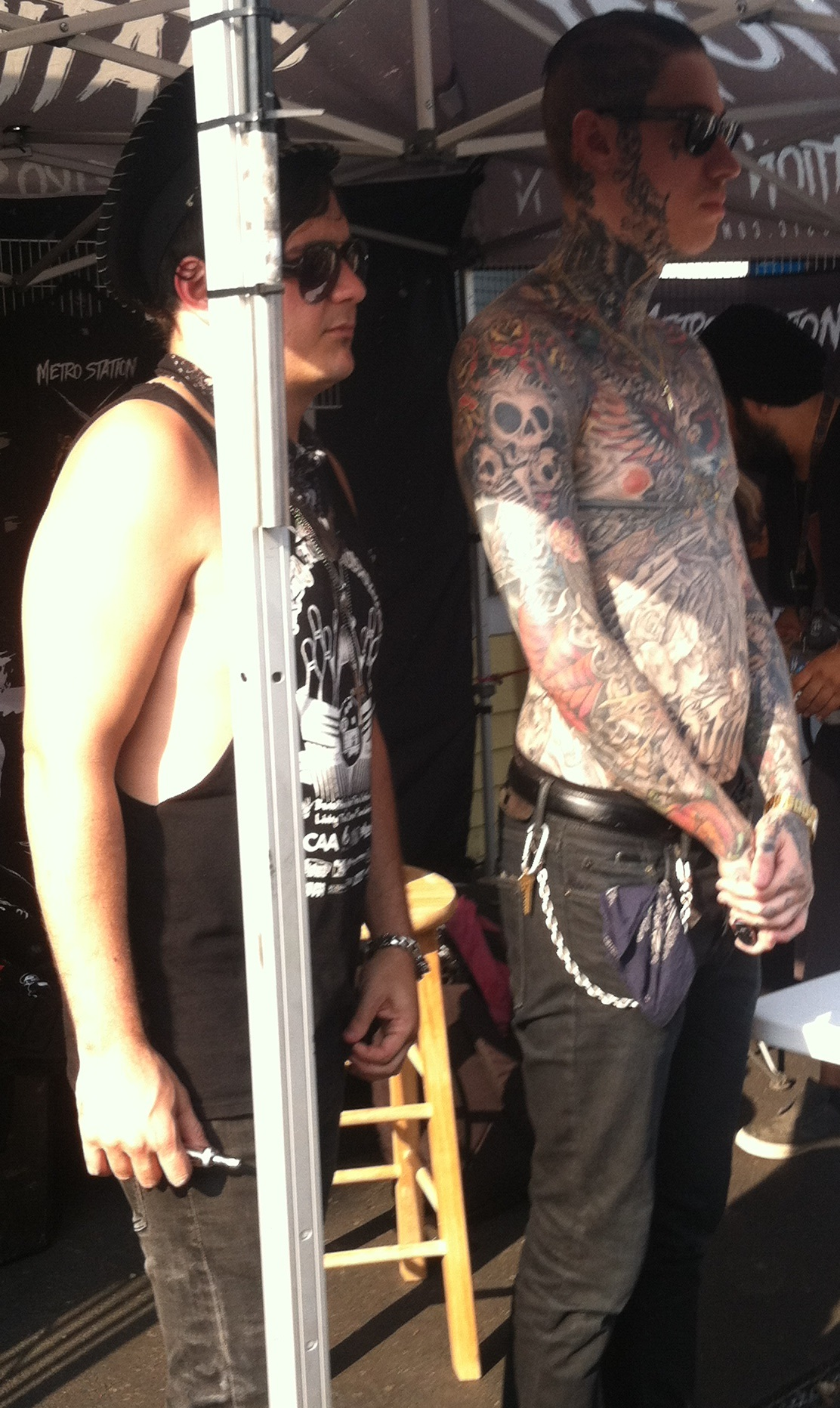
- Metro Station in 2015 at the Warped Tour in Hartford, Connecticut, US

Background information
- Origin: Los Angeles, California, U.S.
- Genres: Pop rock; synth-pop; scene pop; pop-punk
- Years active: 2006–2010; 2011–2017; 2019–2020
- Labels: Columbia; RED Ink
- Past members: Mason Musso; Trace Cyrus; Spencer Steffan; Blake Healy; Anthony Improgo; Kenny Bozich; Austin Sands; Cary White; Ryan Daly

Metro Station was an American pop rock band that was formed in Los Angeles, California by singer Mason Musso and bassist/guitarist Trace Cyrus. In late 2006, the band signed a recording contract with Columbia Records and RED Ink Records. The band is best known for the commercially successful hit single "Shake It" from the group's self-titled debut album. In 2010, tension between Cyrus and Musso caused the band to go on hiatus. In 2011, the band returned, however, it was announced that Cyrus was no longer a part of the group and Musso had purchased the rights to the name.

In 2014, Cyrus returned to the group and a new drummer, Spencer Steffan, came to the group as well, and a new single entitled "Love & War" was released. In 2015, the band released a second full-length album, titled Savior. After this, the band went on a U.S and European tour, announcing an EP called Bury Me My Love along with a U.S. 10-year anniversary tour. They reunited once again in 2019 and released the single "I Hate Society" in 2020.

== History ==
=== Beginnings ===
In 2005, Mason Musso and Trace Cyrus agreed to meet on the set of Hannah Montana, which starred Mason's brother, Mitchel, and Trace's sister, Miley, and father Billy Ray. Sharing musical interests, they decided to form a band. Shortly thereafter, Cyrus recruited Blake Healy from Synthetic Joy and the Bum Out Eternal as a keyboardist, synthesist, and bassist. Metro Station soon gained the attention of drummer Anthony Improgo, who was added as the band's drummer after the group released the song "Seventeen Forever" on its MySpace Music website. The group's popularity on MySpace Music grew, and the band eventually topped the MySpace Music Unsigned Band's charts. The group self-released their debut EP The Questions We Ask at Night in 2006.

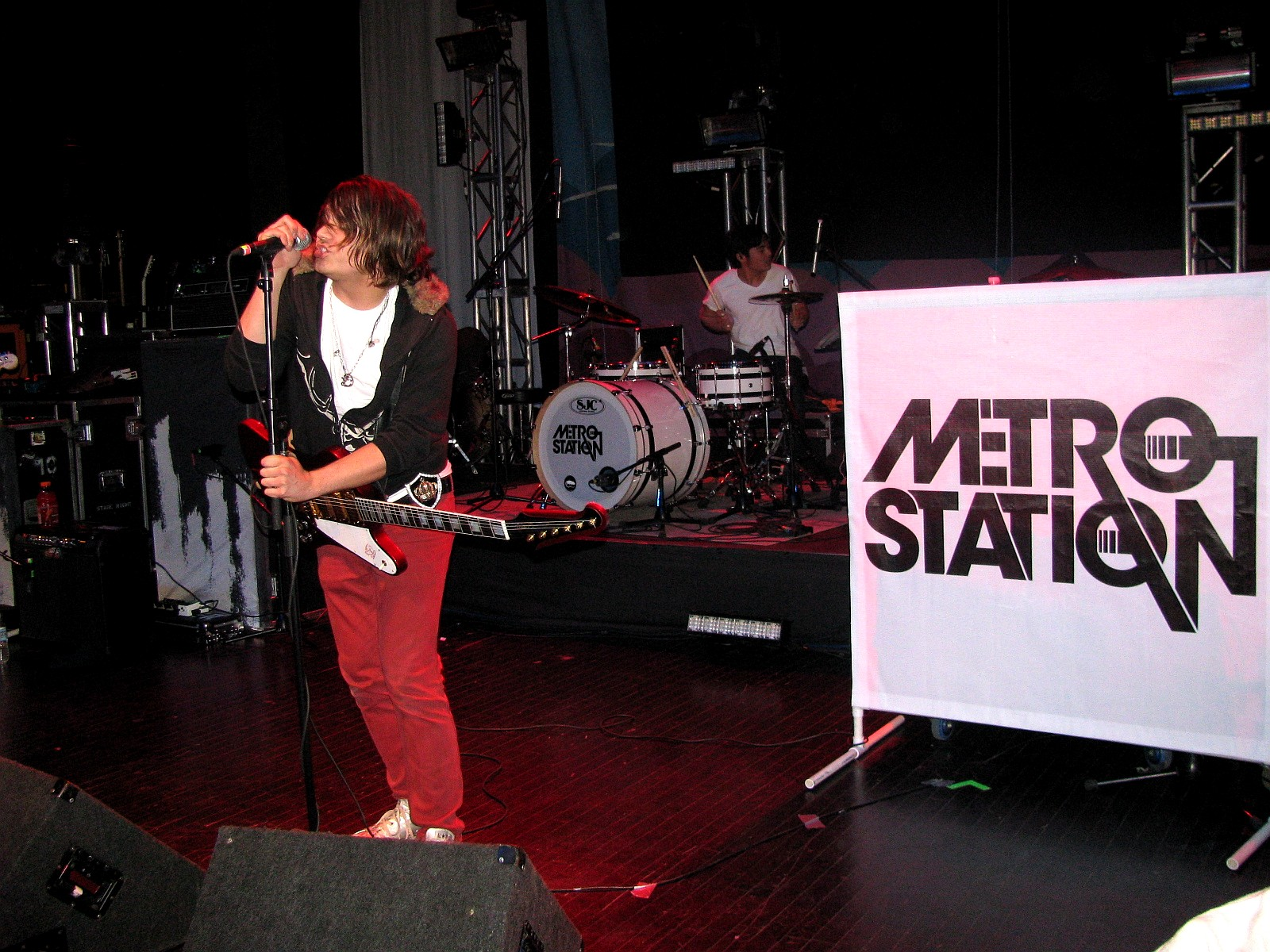
Metro Station performing in Michigan in 2007

Metro Station was discovered by an intern working for Columbia Records' Walking Eye program, while looking through the MySpace Music charts, and the group was signed shortly thereafter. In the July 2007 issue of music magazine Alternative Press, Metro Station was listed as one of the "22 Best Underground Bands (That Likely Won't Stay Underground for Long)."

=== Metro Station (2007–2009) ===
Metro Station performing in 2008; Trace Cyrus (left) and Mason Musso (right)

The group headed to New York City to record their debut album. The album was produced by S*A*M and Sluggo and the band finished recording the album in July 2007. During the writing of the album, the group cited inspiration from the Postal Service, Forever the Sickest Kids and the Killers. In the summer of 2007, the band went on tour with Valencia and Just Surrender. "Kelsey" was released on August 7, 2007 as the first single from their debut album. The song peaked at number one on the US Dance Singles Sales chart. The song also reached the New Zealand Top 40 chart at number 25. They released their self-titled debut album on September 18, 2007. From October to December 2007, the group joined Motion City Soundtrack on their US headlining tour. The album's second single "Control", was released on December 17, 2007.

On April 1, 2008, the group released the album's third single, "Shake It". The song found commercial success, peaking at number ten on the Billboard Hot 100. The song was certified 2× Platinum by the RIAA. The success of the song also affected album sales with the album charting nine months later in 2008, peaking at number 39 on the Billboard 200. The album also topped the US Dance/Electronic Albums chart. The album went on to sell over 87,000 copies in the US and was certified gold in Canada. The album's fourth and final single "Seventeen Forever", was released on December 13, 2008. The song peaked at number 42 on the Billboard Hot 100 and was certified gold in the United States.

Metro Station performed at the 2008 Bamboozle festival in April. From October to November 2008, the group embarked on their first headlining tour, Disco Balls & Blow Up Dolls tour with support from the White Tie Affair, Cash Cash and Tyga. The band joined Boys Like Girls on their UK tour in January 2009. In April 2009, Metro Station toured in the Believers Never Die Tour Part Deux with Hey Monday, All Time Low, Cobra Starship and Fall Out Boy.

On September 28, 2009, the group released their Kelsey EP. The band contributed a song to the Alice in Wonderland soundtrack, Almost Alice, titled "Where's My Angel".

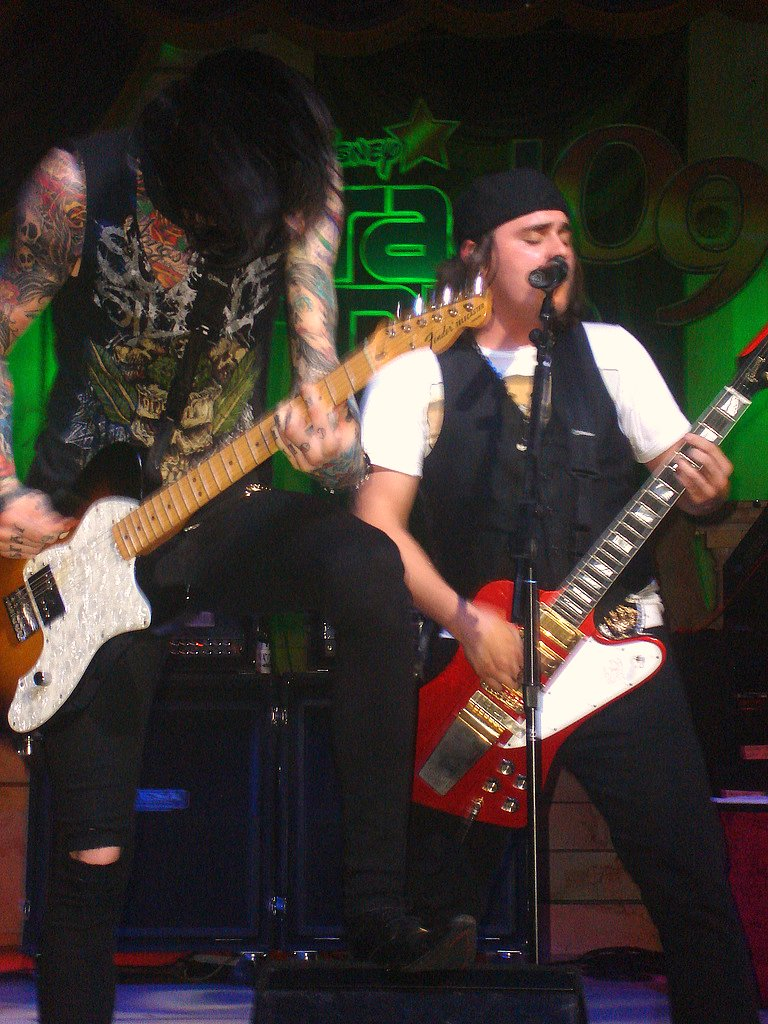
Metro Station performing in 2009; Trace Cyrus (left) and Mason Musso (right)

=== Internal disputes and hiatus (2010) ===
The group began working on their second studio album in the summer of 2009, having written over 20 tracks. Cyrus described the forthcoming album as "more mature" and expected it to be released in early 2010. In November 2009, the band joined Miley Cyrus on the Wonder World Tour. Mid-way through the tour, keyboardist Blake Healy departed from the group. Musso later revealed that Healy left to focus on his marriage. A month later, drummer Anthony Improgo also left the band. In March 2010, after a number of personal disputes between band members Mason Musso and Trace Cyrus in the studio, Metro Station went into indefinite hiatus as Musso and Cyrus split to pursue solo projects, putting Metro Station on a back-burner until they felt they could record together again. Musso retained his connections to the Metro Station name, while Cyrus began a solo project he named Ashland High.

=== Middle of the Night and Gold (2011–2014) ===
On May 31, 2011, Musso released a new song, "Ain't So High", on his YouTube page, metrostation2011. Musso regained rights to the Metro Station name and used the band's name without Cyrus. On July 20, Musso announced on Twitter that he was working on the new Metro Station record with help from Anthony Improgo and Blake Healy. On September 25, Musso released another track, "Closer and Closer" which was produced by Blake Healy. On November 20, Mason Musso, Anthony Improgo, and Ryan Daly performed at the American Music Awards Red Carpet. In May 2013, Musso released a five-track EP, Middle of the Night through an Indiegogo campaign. The EP was later released via iTunes on August 20, 2013. The EP's lead single "Every Time I Touch You" was released on July 23, 2013, and was written by Musso and Healy.

On August 13, 2014, Cyrus returned to the band, four years after previously leaving. Shortly after Cyrus' return, the band released a new single titled "Love & War". They premiered another track "She Likes Girls" on September 9, 2014. On October 14, 2014, the group released an EP titled Gold. On October 28, 2014, the band released the music video for their single "She Likes Girls". From October to November 2014, the group co-headlined the Outsiders Tour alongside the Ready Set with support from the Downtown Fiction and Against the Current.

=== Savior (2015–2020) ===
In the spring of 2015, the group embarked on a headlining US tour with support from SayWeCanFly and 7 Minutes in Heaven. On June 9, 2015, the group released the lead single from their second studio album, "Getting Over You" which featured Ronnie Radke. On June 30, 2015, the band released their second studio album, Savior, which featured 18 tracks. The band performed at the 2015 Vans Warped Tour. The group toured with Falling in Reverse, Atilla, and Assuming We Survive from October 2015 to December 2015 on the Supervillians tour. Metro Station toured with Never Shout Never, Jule Vera, and Waterparks from January 2016 to February 2016.

Metro Station had announced that the band was working on recording an acoustic album. In October and November 2016, the band headlined the Savior tour with support from Palaye Royale and the Strive. In 2017, the headlined their 10-Year Anniversary tour in celebrate the 10-year release of their debut studio album. They released their Bury Me My Love EP on September 8, 2017. Following the tour, the band announced they were breaking up. They reunited once again in 2019 and began working on new music in Los Angeles, California. Cyrus confirmed that an album would be released in 2020. In April 2020, the group released a new single "I Hate Society".

Following the release of the single, Musso has started a new musical project under the name Social Order along with former drummer Anthony Improgo, while Cyrus returned as a solo artist releasing his debut EP, Killing the Pain in 2021.

== Musical style ==
Their music has been described as pop rock, synth-pop pop punk, emo pop and scene music. Kerrang! stated that the band was power pop, and also categorized them as a "MySpace band". Their self-titled debut album has been described as electropop and scene pop, with elements of 80's pop, emo pop, new wave and pop punk. Music critics compared the album to Panic! at the Disco for its songwriting and catchiness. The singles "Shake It" and "Seventeen Forever" were often described as neon pop-punk.

The band's influences include the Postal Service, Depeche Mode, New Order and OMD.

== Band members ==
Past members

- Mason Musso – vocals, guitars, keyboards, synthesizer (2006–2017, 2019–2020)
- Trace Cyrus – vocals, guitars, bass, synthesizer (2006–2010, 2014–2017, 2019–2020)
- Spencer Steffan – drums, backing vocals (2015–2017, 2019-2020; touring 2014–2015)
- Blake Healy – keyboards, synthesizer, bass (2006–2009, 2011-2013)
- Anthony Improgo – drums (2006–2009, 2013–2014)
- Kenny Bozich – keyboards, synthesizer, guitars, bass, drums (2009–2010)
- Austin Sands – keyboards, guitars (2011–2013)
- Cary White – drums (2011–2013)

Former touring members

- Jimmy Gregerson – guitars, keyboards, synthesizer (2015–2017)
- Ryan Daly – guitars, backing vocals (2012–2013)
- Bryan Lemus – keyboards, synthesizer (2014–2015)
- Jeff Simpson – keyboards, synthesizer (2015)

== Discography ==
- Metro Station (2007)
- Savior (2015)

== Awards and nominations ==
Year	Association	Category	Result	Ref.
2008	Australian Kids' Choice Awards	Favourite Song — "Shake It"	Won	
2008	MTV EMAs	Best Alternative Band	Won	
2008	Rocksound Awards	Worst Song of the Year — "Shake It"	Won	
2008	AP Music Awards	Song of the Year — "Shake It"	Won	
2009	MuchMusic Video Awards	Best International Video – Group	Nominated	
2009	Kerrang! Music Awards	Best International Newcomer	Nominated	
2009	Los Premios MTV	Best Ringtone — "Shake It"	Nominated	
2009	MTV EMAs	Best Push Act	Nominated	
2010	Kerrang! Magazine Readers' Awards	Worst Band	Won	
2014	Kerrang! Music Awards	Best Comeback	Nominated	
2015	Kerrang! Music Awards	Best Collaboration — "Getting Over You" with Ronnie Radke	Won	
2018	Rocksound Awards	Most Heartbreaking Breakup of the Year	Nominated	
