= Mason Musso =

American musician (born 1989)

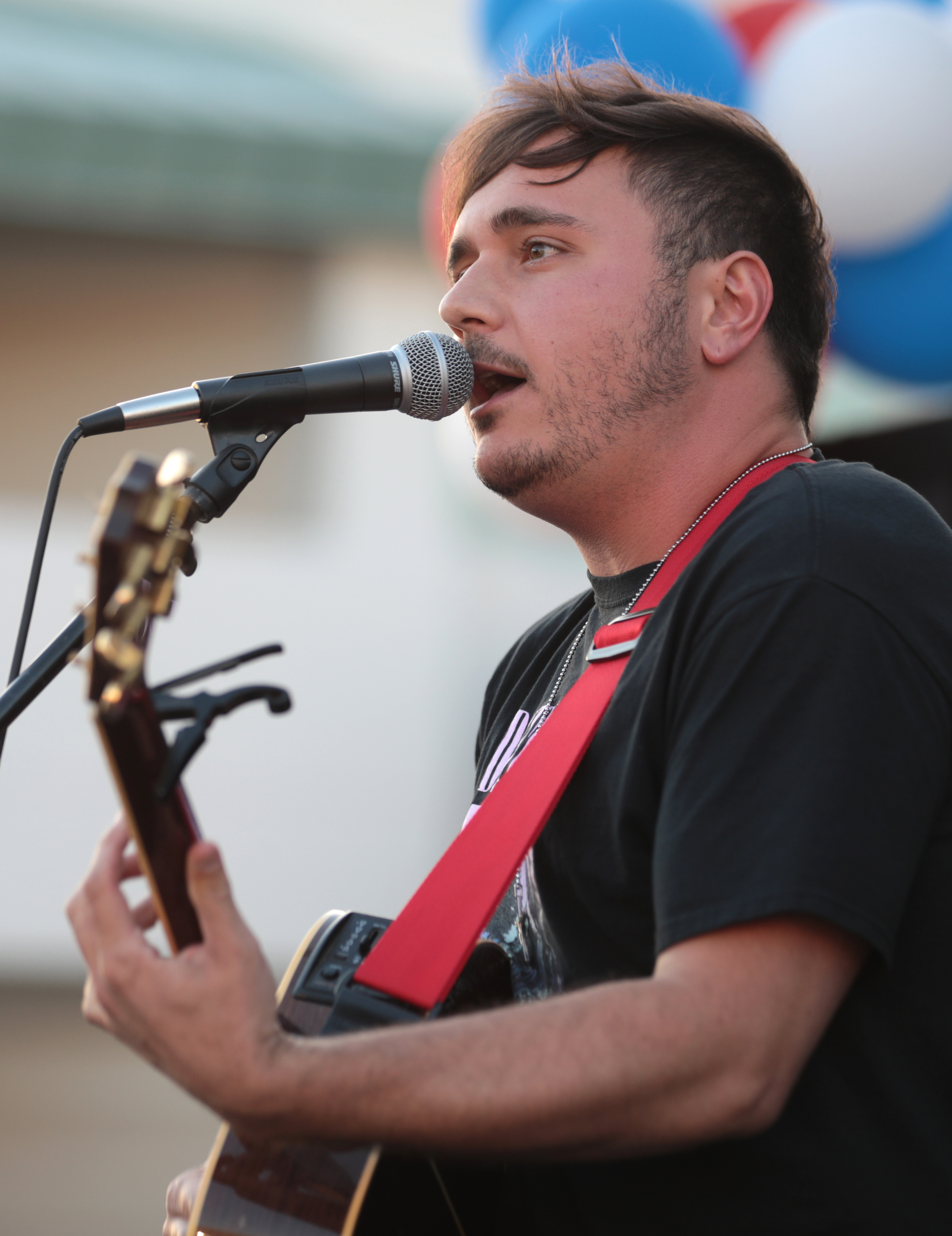
- Musso in 2021

Background information
- Born: Mason Tyler Musso; March 17, 1989 (age 37); Dallas, Texas, U.S.
- Origin: Burbank, California, U.S.
- Genres: Pop rock; emo pop; alternative rock; synth-pop; electropop; pop
- Occupations: Musician; singer; songwriter; podcaster
- Instruments: Vocals; guitar; keyboards
- Years active: 2006–present
- Label: Musso
- Member of: Social Order
- Formerly of: Metro Station

Mason Tyler Musso (born March 17, 1989) is an American musician, singer and songwriter, best known for being the older brother of actor Mitchel Musso and former lead vocalist of Metro Station. He is also the lead vocalist for Social Order.

== Early life ==
Mason Tyler Musso was born to Katherine (née Moore) and Samuel Musso in Dallas, Texas, on March 17, 1989. Soon after, his family moved to Rockwall, Texas. He has two younger brothers, Mitchel and Marc, who are both actors. In 2006, Mitchel landed the role of Oliver Oken on the Disney Channel children's comedy series Hannah Montana, causing the Musso family to move to Burbank, California. Musso attended College of the Canyons studying music business classes in 2006.

Musso took up piano lessons at a young age, before he got his first guitar on Christmas and started playing in a church band in Texas.

== Career ==
=== Beginnings and Metro Station: 2006–2010 ===
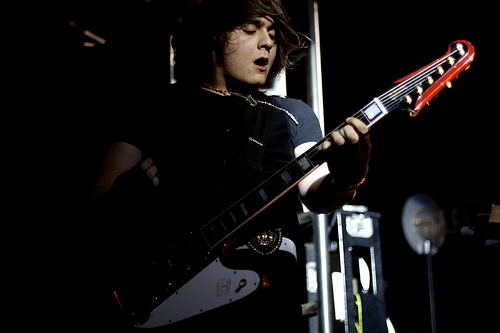
Musso performing in 2008

Mason Musso met Trace Cyrus, the middle son of country singer and actor Billy Ray Cyrus and older brother of actress and musician Miley Cyrus, on the set of Miley and Mitchel's television show, Hannah Montana. Soon afterward, the two formed the band Metro Station with Blake Healy and Anthony Improgo. The group released songs on Myspace and soon signed a record deal with Columbia/Red Ink. The band released their self-titled debut studio album on September 18, 2007. The album peaked at number 39 on Billboard 200 and was certified gold in Canada. The album included their hit single, "Shake It", which peaked at #10 on the Billboard Hot 100. Internationally, it charted in the top ten in eight countries outside the United States (#2 in Australia, #4 in Canada and the Republic of Ireland, #6 in the United Kingdom, #8 in Japan and #9 in Austria, Germany and New Zealand). The single was certified Gold by the RIAA on June 13, 2008, and later Platinum that year, finally reaching Double Platinum status at the end of January 2009. In December 2008, they released their fourth single "Seventeen Forever" from the album. It is their second song to chart on the Billboard Hot 100 at number 42 and was certified gold.

Musso provided additional vocals on the song "Crowded Room" by The Academy Is... from their third studio album, Fast Times at Barrington High in 2008, and backing vocals on "Shout It" by his brother Mitchel Musso from his self-titled debut studio album.

=== Breakup and solo project: 2010–2011 ===
The band went on and recorded a song for the feature-length film Alice in Wonderland, titled "Where's My Angel". In March 2010, after a number of personal disputes between Musso and Cyrus the band went into indefinite hiatus. Metro Station officially disbanded when it was announced both Musso and Cyrus were working on solo projects. In November 2010, Musso worked with his brother Mitchel for his EP, Brainstorm.

In April 2011, Musso acquired the rights to the Metro Station name and on May 31, 2011, Musso released the track "Ain't So High". On July 20, 2011, Musso announced he was working on a new Metro Station record with help from former members Blake Healy and Anthony Improgo. On September 25, 2011, Musso released a second song, "Closer and Closer" on SoundCloud and YouTube with Blake Healy. On November 20, Musso along with Improgo and Ryan Daly performed at the 2011 American Music Awards Red Carpet. In April 2012, Musso released the song, "Ciao Bella", via his self-titled record label and co-wrote the track with Simon Wilcox, Jim and PJ Bianco.

=== Return of Metro Station: 2013–2017, 2019–2020 ===
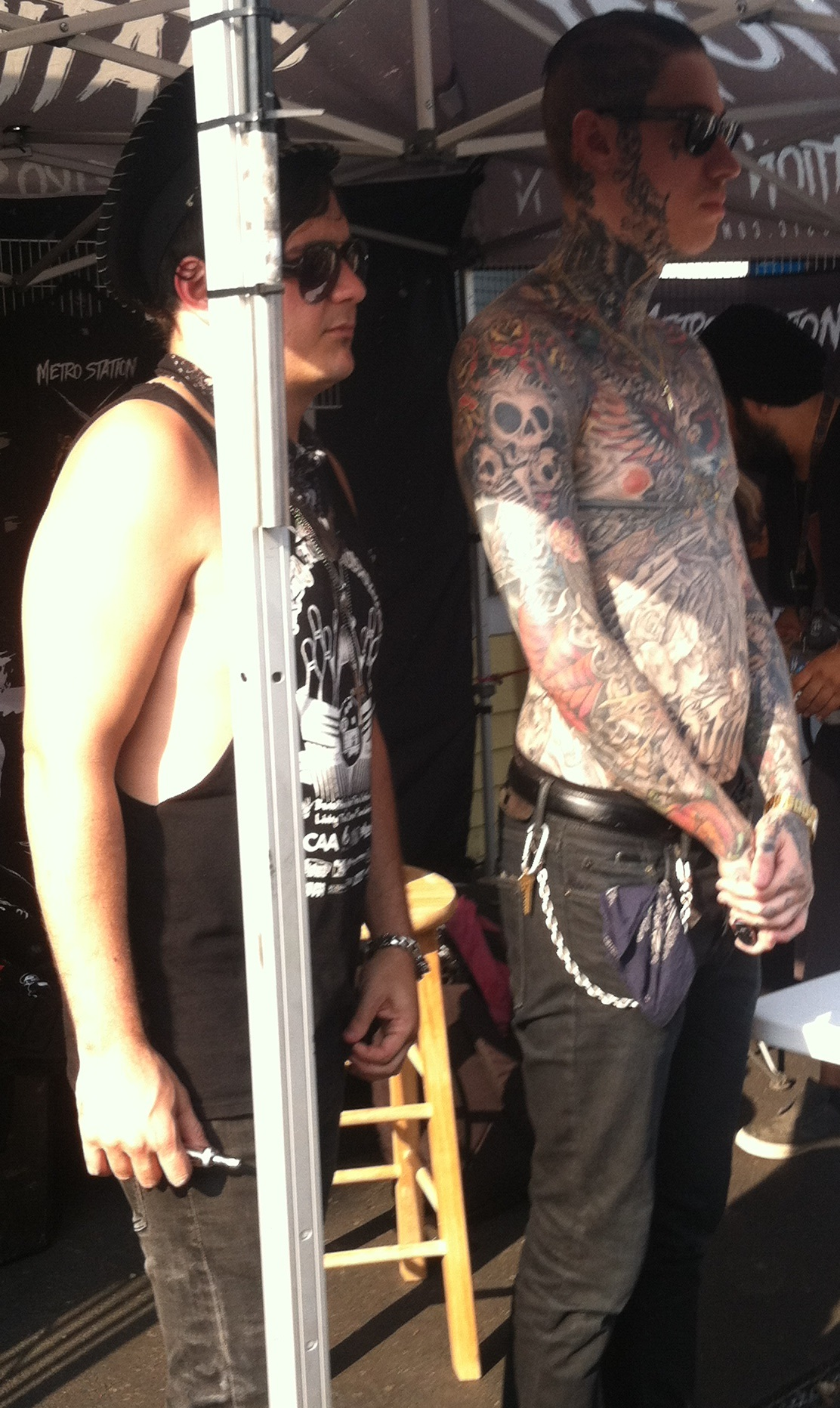
Musso (left) with Trace Cyrus in Hartford, Connecticut on the 2015 Warped Tour

In August 2013, Musso released the EP, Middle of the Night. On August 13, 2014, Cyrus returned to the band and they released their comeback single, "Love and War". On October 14, the group released their fourth EP, Gold. On June 30, 2015, the band released their second studio album, Savior. They disbanded once again in 2017, but reunited again in 2019, and released the single "I Hate Society" in 2020.

In 2015, Musso was featured in a song with rapper B.LaY titled "It Comes From You".

=== Social Order: 2020–present ===
In 2020, Musso worked with Louis Vecchio, Matthew Di Panni and Anthony Improgo to start a new project under the name "Social Order". Musso spoke in an interview with Alternative Press on why he started the group. He stated, "The whole quarantine has definitely got me wanting to write more, try new projects and experiment with different stuff that I wouldn't normally do." Their debut single "Going Outside Dancing" was released that same year. The group released an EP titled, How to Lie in 2022.

In September 2023, Musso collaborated with synthwave artist Dreamkid, singing lead vocals on the song "Take Me On Tonight", which Musso also co-wrote. Social Order released their second EP, Tantalize in October 2023.

== Discography ==
Metro Station

- Metro Station (2007)
- Savior (2015)

Social Order

- How to Lie (2022)
- Tantalize (2023)

Other appearances

Title	Year	Artist(s)	Album	Notes	Ref.
"Crowded Room"	2008	The Academy Is...	Fast Times at Barrington High	Additional vocals	
"Shout It"	2009	Mitchel Musso	Mitchel Musso	Backing vocals	
"When You Stole My Heart"	2012	Trey Ewald	3	Composer	
"Ghosted"	2019	Yumi	Ghosted	Composer	
"Take Me On Tonight"	2023	Dreamkid	Daggers	Lead vocals, songwriter	
