= We the Kings discography =

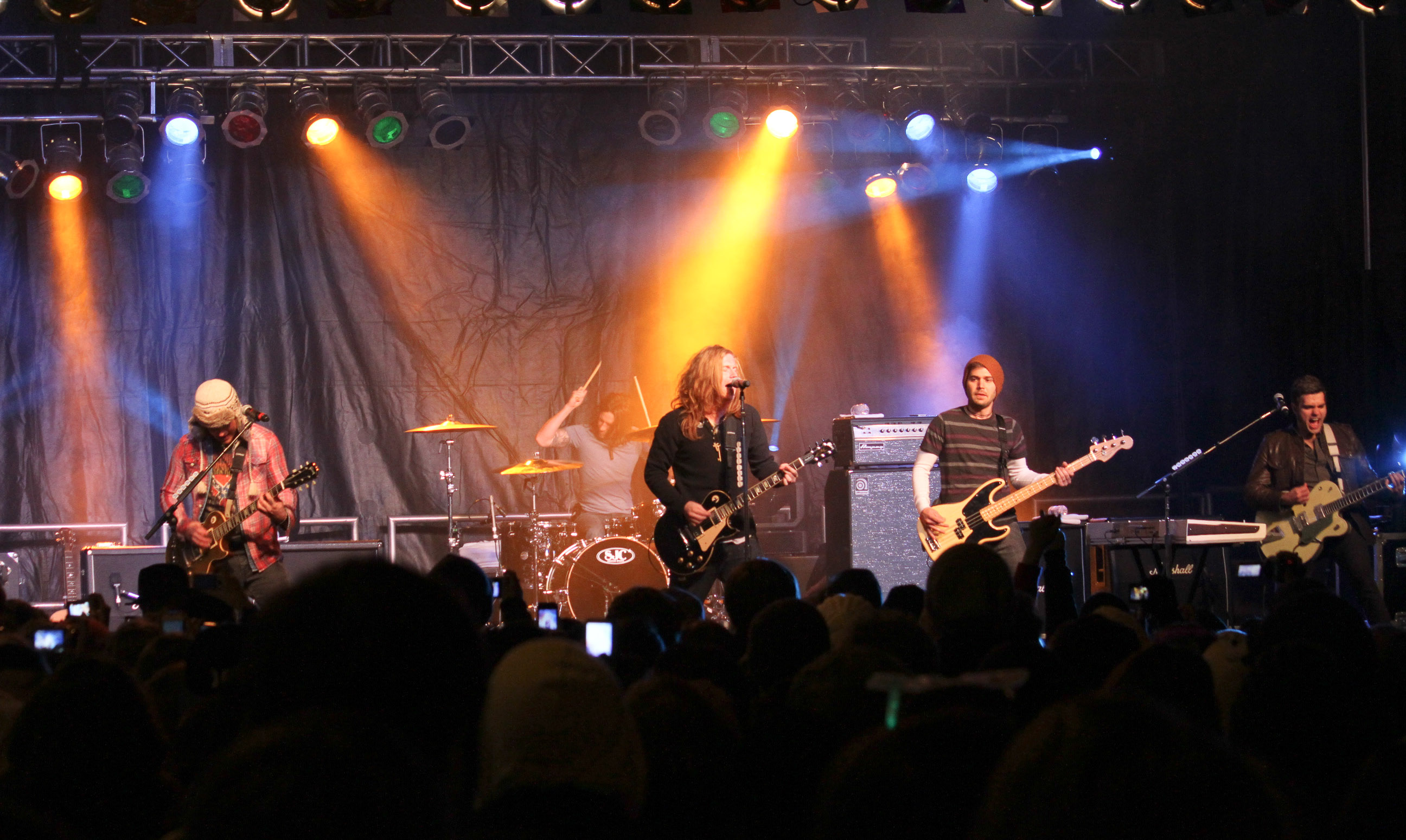
- Studio albums: 8
- EPs: 5
- Compilation albums: 1
- Singles: 26

American rock band We the Kings has released eight studio albums, one compilation album, five extended plays, and 26 singles. The band's self-titled full-length debut album, released in 2007, included the platinum single "Check Yes Juliet", and went on to sell over 250,000 copies in the US. The group's second album Smile Kid (2009) included Top 40 singles "Heaven Can Wait" and "We'll Be a Dream" (featuring Demi Lovato), as well as the single "She Takes Me High".

The band's third album Sunshine State of Mind was released in 2011 and featured the MTV Video Music Award winner for Most Innovative Music Video of the Year for the group's interactive music video and song "Say You Like Me". Their fourth album Somewhere Somehow was released in late 2013 and includes singles "Just Keep Breathing", "Find You There", "Any Other Way", and "Art of War". Their fifth studio album, Strange Love, came out on November 20, 2015. It featured the single "Runaway".

== Albums ==
=== Studio albums ===
List of studio albums, with selected chart positions
Title	Album details	Peak chart positions							Certifications
Title	Album details	US	US Alt.	US Rock	CAN	SCO	UK	UK Indie	Certifications
We the Kings	Released: October 2, 2007; Label: S-Curve (80731 52001 2 1); Formats: CD, DL	151	—	—	—	—	—	—	RIAA: Gold; ARIA: Platinum
Smile Kid	Released: December 8, 2009; Label: S-Curve; Formats: CD, DL	112	15	24	—	—	—	—	
Sunshine State of Mind	Released: July 5, 2011; Label: S-Curve; Formats: CD, DL	45	5	9	—	—	—	—	
Somewhere Somehow	Released: December 16, 2013; Label: Ozone Entertainment; Formats: CD, DL, LP	44	5	6	—	81	88	7	
Stripped	Released: November 24, 2014; Label: Ozone Entertainment; Formats: DL	—	—	—	—	—	—	—	
Strange Love	Released: November 20, 2015; Label: Ozone Entertainment; Formats: CD, DL	137	—	—	85	—	—	—	
Self Titled Nostalgia	Released: September 12, 2017; Label: Ozone Entertainment; Formats: CD, DL	—	—	—	—	—	—	—	
Six	Released: July 6, 2018; Label: S-Curve; Formats: CD, DL	—	—	—	—	—	—	—	
"—" denotes a recording that did not chart or was not released in that territory.

=== Compilation albums ===
List of compilation albums
Title	Album details
So Far	Released: June 17, 2016; Label: S-Curve, BMG; Formats: CD, DL

== Extended plays ==
List of extended plays
Title	EP details
Between the Ink and the Paper	Released: 2006; Label: Self-released; Formats: CD, DL
Secret Valentine EP	Released: December 16, 2008; Label: S-Curve; Formats: CD, DL
Party, Fun, Love, and Radio EP	Released: July 3, 2012; Label: S-Curve; Formats: DL
Friday Is Forever EP	Released: January 21, 2013; Label: S-Curve; Formats: DL
SAGA	Released: February 5, 2021; Label: S-Curve; Formats: DL

== Singles ==
List of singles, with selected chart positions and certifications, showing year released and album name
Title	Year	Peak chart positions						Certifications	Album
Title	Year	US	US Pop	AUS	CAN	IRE	UK	Certifications	Album
"Skyway Avenue"	2007	—	—	—	—	—	—	RIAA: Gold	We the Kings
"Check Yes Juliet"	2008	70	25	26 (Note: "Check Yes Juliet" charted in Australia in 2011, and was released as their first official single in the region for their Australian tour.)	—	—	—	RIAA: 3× Platinum; ARIA: 3× Platinum; BPI: Silver; RMNZ: Gold	We the Kings
"Secret Valentine"	2008	—	40	—	—	—	—	RIAA: Gold	We the Kings
"Heaven Can Wait"	2009	— (Note: "Heaven Can Wait" did not enter the Billboard Hot 100, but peaked at number 4 on the Bubbling Under Hot 100 chart.)	30	—	—	—	—		Smile Kid
"We'll Be a Dream" (featuring Demi Lovato)	2010	76	23	—	—	—	—		Smile Kid
"She Takes Me High"	2010	—	—	—	—	—	—		Smile Kid
"Friday Is Forever"	2011	—	—	—	—	—	—		Sunshine State of Mind
"Say You Like Me"	2011	—	32	29	—	—	—	RIAA: Platinum; ARIA: Gold	Sunshine State of Mind
"Just Keep Breathing"	2013	92	—	81	63	24	66		Somewhere Somehow
"Find You There"	2013	— (Note: "Find You There" did not enter the Billboard Hot 100, but peaked at number 25 on the Bubbling Under Hot 100 chart.)	—	—	91	47	—		Somewhere Somehow
"Any Other Way"	2013	—	—	—	—	—	—		Somewhere Somehow
"Art of War"	2013	—	—	—	—	—	—		Somewhere Somehow
"Love Again"	2015	—	—	—	—	—	—		Strange Love
"Runaway"	2015	—	—	—	—	—	—		Strange Love
"The Story of Tonight"	2016	—	—	—	—	—	—		Non-album singles
"Ally"	2017	—	—	—	—	—	—		Non-album singles
"Stay Young"	2017	—	—	—	—	—	—		Non-album singles
"Check Yes Juliet"	2017	—	—	—	—	—	—	ARIA: 3× Platinum	Non-album singles
"Skyway Avenue"	2017	—	—	—	—	—	—		Non-album singles
"Whoa"	2017	—	—	—	—	—	—		Non-album singles
"Planes, Trains & Cars"	2017	—	—	—	—	—	—		Non-album singles
"Festival Music"	2017	—	—	—	—	—	—		Non-album singles
"Turn It UP"	2019	—	—	—	—	—	—		SAGA
"These Nights"	2020	—	—	—	—	—	—		SAGA
"No 1 Like U"	2020	—	—	—	—	—	—		SAGA
"—" denotes a recording that did not chart or was not released in that territory.

== Other charted and certified songs ==
Title	Year	Peak chart positions		Certifications	Album
Title	Year	US Adult	CAN	Certifications	Album
"Sad Song" (featuring Elena Coats)	2016	34	98	RIAA: 2× Platinum; ARIA: Platinum; RMNZ: Gold	Somewhere Somehow
