= Doug Fenske =

- Born: Albert Douglas Fenske, J.R. January 11, 1982 (age 44); Harvey, Illinois, United States
- Origin: Richton Park, Illinois
- Genres: Pop, contemporary R&B, electropop, pop-rap
- Occupations: Record producer, recording engineer, mix engineer, instrumentalist
- Instruments: Saxophone, keyboards, talkbox
- Years active: 2005–present

Doug Fenske (born January 11, 1982) is an American record producer, recording engineer, mix engineer, and remixer from suburban Chicago, Illinois. He has worked in Los Angeles since 2005, and has been involved in several aspects of record production. Fenske has worked on a string of commercially and critically successful albums, including Frank Ocean's Channel Orange, Chris Brown's Exclusive [The FOREVER Edition], Jamie Foxx's Intuition, and Jordin Sparks' Jordin Sparks. His production experience includes collaborations with some of the music industry's most elite artists, writers, producers, and engineers.

== Childhood and education ==
=== Childhood and youth ===
Fenske was born in Harvey, Illinois, the first child of an educator mother and a village manager father. He spent his formative years in Richton Park, IL, where he attended Neil A. Armstrong Elementary. His first foray into music began at age 10, when he picked up an alto saxophone, joined the school's concert band and began learning classical music theory. Two years later, he joined the school district's jazz ensemble, and spent a year learning jazz theory and playing second alto behind an older student. But Fenske's skill quickly rose to the surface and by age 13, he earned the lead alto seat for both jazz ensemble and concert band. During this time he excelled as a three-sport athlete, playing football, baseball, and basketball. Fenske enrolled at Rich South High School in Richton Park, and was quickly promoted to the upperclass jazz ensemble, playing second tenor sax, all while performing with the school's symphonic band. As a sophomore, he was moved to baritone sax in both jazz ensemble and symphonic band, and was promoted to lead alto in both bands at the beginning of his junior year. It was during this time that Fenske realized he wanted a career in record production. As a senior, he played in the jazz combo band, and was featured on soprano sax in the jazz ensemble. Still an athlete, he played four years of football, three years of baseball, and one year of basketball for Rich South.

=== Education ===
Fenske decided to attend Eastern Illinois University in Charleston, IL as a communications major in 2000. He quickly aligned with other students to form "11th and Cleveland", a band named after the block where they rehearsed. Fenske played sax and keyboards for the band, which spent two years touring the bar circuit and neighboring colleges. Although Fenske was heavily influenced by 90s hip hop, rock and alternative music, his band covered songs by Phish, Led Zeppelin, Tom Petty, and Herbie Hancock – whom he would later work with on Hancock's collaboration with Quincy Jones. As band members started leaving school, Fenske started creating full instrumental tracks on his own with a computer. He continued honing his craft for the next two years and graduated in 2004 with a bachelor's degree. In early 2005, Fenske moved to Tempe, AZ to attend the Conservatory of Recording Arts and Sciences, an audio engineering school known for its prominence in music. While in school, he collaborated with other students on recording projects, was the president of the school's chapter of the Audio Engineering Society, and was at the head of his class. He also began remixing tracks by artists like D'Angelo, The Roots, and Busta Rhymes using live instrumentation. Fenske graduated from The Conservatory in October 2005 and moved to Los Angeles, Calif. to begin his professional career in music.

== Career ==
=== Engineering ===
Upon arrival in Los Angeles, Fenske started interning at Westlake Recording Studios in Hollywood. A major studio rich in tradition, Westlake provided Fenske with the opportunity to become a professional. By 2008, Fenske ascended in the ranks at Westlake to become an assistant engineer, working with artists like Quincy Jones, Britney Spears, Cee Lo Green, Snoop Dogg, Randy Jackson, Jack Douglas, and Herbie Hancock. Soon Fenske began building an engineering clientele of his own, spending time in the studio with Ne-Yo, Stargate, Eric Hudson, The Writing Camp, and Ryan Tedder. He incorporated, forming Real Records, and left Westlake in early 2009 to become an independent engineer and producer. Since going independent, Fenske has recorded and mixed songs for Frank Ocean, Andre 3000, Bruno Mars, LL Cool J, John Legend, The Wanted, Diplo, Kelly Rowland, Emily Osment, Toni Braxton, Nellee Hooper, Mika, Stereo Skyline, and others.

=== Production ===
Fenske has produced songs for a series of independent labels and artists. Most notably, Wind-up Records distributed a song that Fenske produced and mixed for Emily Osment called Drift, and a song for Dylan Synclaire featuring Chris Rene of The X Factor (U.S. season 1) called Hollywood Lyfe.

=== Grammy Award nomination ===
On December 5, 2012, Fenske was nominated for a Grammy Award in recognition of his engineering work on Frank Ocean's "Channel Orange" album.

== Discography ==
| Year | Artist | Album | Details |
|---|---|---|---|
| 2022 | Greydon Square | Type 4: City on the Type of Forever | Producer, Talkbox |
| 2022 | Sean Paul | Scorcha | Engineer |
| 2022 | Teen AF | Polarity (Upscale Remix) | Producer, Mixing |
| 2021 | Doug Fenske | Somewhere in Paris | Primary Artist, Composer, Producer, Mixing |
| 2021 | Doug Fenske | Unread | Primary Artist, Composer, Producer, Mixing |
| 2020 | Doug Fenske | Memory | Primary Artist, Producer, Mixing |
| 2013 | Dylan Synclaire | The Sample Collection, Volume 1 | Producer, Mixing |
| 2013 | LL Cool J | Authentic | Mixing, Engineer |
| 2012 | Frank Ocean | Channel Orange | Engineer |
| 2012 | The Wanted | The Wanted | Engineer |
| 2012 | Dylan Synclaire | "DITTO" | Producer, Mixing |
| 2012 | Greydon Square | Type II : The Mandelbrot Set | Producer |
| 2011 | Dylan Synclaire | Hollywood Lyfe (feat. Chris Rene) | Producer, Mixing, Alto Sax |
| 2011 | Emily Osment | Lovesick | Mixing |
| 2011 | Emily Osment | Drift | Producer, Mixing |
| 2011 | Dylan Synclaire | SleepWalkin' | Producer, Mixing |
| 2011 | Dylan Synclaire | S.O.S. Sounds of Synclaire | Producer, Mixing |
| 2010 | INXS | Original Sin | Vocal Engineer |
| 2010 | Jason Castro | Jason Castro | Assistant Engineer |
| 2010 | Stereo Skyline | Stuck on Repeat | Engineer |
| 2010 | Emily Osment | Fight or Flight | Mixing, Vocal Recording |
| 2010 | Dylan Synclaire | Cloud Stains | Producer, Mixing |
| 2010 | Greydon Square | The Kardashev Scale | Producer |
| 2010 | Dylan Synclaire | Crush | Producer, Mixing |
| 2009 | Melanie Fiona | The Bridge | Engineer |
| 2009 | American Idol | American Idol: Season 8 | Engineer |
| 2008 | Chris Brown | Forever | Engineer |
| 2008 | Jamie Foxx | Intuition | Engineer |
| 2008 | Ariana Hall | Not Too Close, Not Too Far EP | Engineer |
| 2008 | Randy Jackson | Randy Jackson's Music Club, Vol. 1 | Assistant Engineer |
| 2007 | Jordin Sparks | Jordin Sparks | Vocal Recording |
| 2007 | Blake Lewis | Audio Day Dream | Engineer |
| 2007 | UGK | Underground Kingz | Assistant Engineer |
| 2007 | Michael Bolton | Swingin' Christmas | Assistant Engineer |
