= Strange Love (disambiguation) =

Strange Love or Strangelove may refer to:

== Film and television ==
- Anokha Pyar (lit. 'Strange Love'), a 1948 Indian Hindi-language film
- Dr. Strangelove, a 1964 film by Stanley Kubrick
- Strange Love, a 1997 anime adaptation of Hen
- Strange Love, a 2005 reality series featuring Brigitte Nielsen and Flavor Flav
- "Strange Love" (True Blood), the pilot episode of True Blood (2008)
- Alex Strangelove, a Netflix Original film (2018)

== Music ==
- The Strangeloves, an American band active 1964–68
- Strange Love (T.S.O.L. album), a 1990 album by T.S.O.L.
- Strangelove (band), an English alternative rock band active 1991–98
- Strangelove: The Depeche Mode Experience, an American Depeche Mode tribute band
- Strange Love (We the Kings album), a 2015 album by We the Kings

=== Songs ===
- "Strange Love" (song) (1961), by Mary Wells
- "Strange Love", from the Hammer Horror film Lust for a Vampire (1971)
- "Strangelove" (song) (1987), by Depeche Mode
- "Strange Love", by Phixx from Electrophonic Revolution (2004)
- "Dr. Strangeluv", by Blonde Redhead from 23 (2007)
- "Strangelove", by Sarah Nixey from Sing, Memory (2007)
- "Strange Love", by Halsey from Badlands (2015)

== Other uses ==
- Dr Strangelove, a character in the video game Metal Gear Solid: Peace Walker
- Dr Strangelove, radio dramatization by Kerry Shale

== See also ==
- Dr Strangelove syndrome, or Alien hand syndrome
- Dr. Strangeglove, antagonist of the online game Moshi Monsters
