= Charles Trippy =

American internet personality

- Born: Charles Paul Trippy III; September 2, 1984 (age 42); Sarasota, Florida, U.S.
- Occupations: YouTuber; musician; comedian
- Spouses: Alli Speed (m. 2011–2014) Allie Wesenberg (m. 2017)
- Children: 2

YouTube information
- Channel: Charles and Allie
- Years active: 2008–present
- Genre: Vlog
- Subscribers: 1.37 million
- Views: 815 million

Charles Paul Trippy III (born September 2, 1984) is an American musician, vlogger and internet personality based in St. Petersburg, Florida. He is a member of Bradenton-based rock band We the Kings. Trippy recorded his first album with We the Kings, titled Somewhere Somehow in 2013. The album peaked at no. 44 on Billboard 200. He is also the creator of Internet Killed Television, a web series aired on YouTube.

== Early life and education ==
Trippy was born to Charles Paul 'Chaz' Trippy II and Marlene Trippy, in 1984, in Sarasota, Florida. He is of Sicilian Italian, German, and Native American descent. His father was a member of the Gregg Allman Band where he played percussion. As a youngster, Trippy often toured with his father's band. His younger sister, Melissa Trippy, is also an internet personality.

Trippy attended Lakewood Ranch High School where he completed his early education. Later, he attended and graduated from the University of South Florida where he majored in communications.

== Career ==
=== As a YouTuber ===
Trippy started his YouTube channel CTFxC in 2008, although the daily vlogs only started on May 1, 2009. Initially, Trippy planned to do daily video blogs for one year, however, he continued to create videos daily after completing the first year. As of 2025, Trippy's daily vlogs is in its 16th year. Calling his daily vlogging series Internet Killed Television, it chronicles his daily life with his wife Allie Marie Trippy (born Wesenberg) and their pets, friends and family. The series formerly featured Trippy's ex-wife, Alli Speed, who would vlog with him for almost six years before they separated in 2014.

Trippy was featured in the documentary film Vlogumentary which was developed by Shay Carl in 2016. One of the channel's video was covered by Good Morning America in 2016.

As of 2025, Trippy continues to create content for his YouTube channel, sharing aspects of his personal and professional life. He remains active with We the Kings, performing and touring with the band.

=== As a musician ===
Trippy playing bass guitar with We the Kings in 2026

Trippy began his music career in 2001 as a bassist for the Bradenton-based post-hardcore band, Funny Looking Kid. He took part in 2002 and 2003 Warped Tour with the band. Funny Looking Kid broke up in 2005.

In 2011, Trippy joined We the Kings as the bass player replacing Drew Thomsen who left the group earlier that year. He recorded his first studio album with the band, Somewhere Somehow, in 2013. The album debuted at no. 44 on the Billboard 200 and at no. 6 on the Top Rock Albums charts. In 2014 and 2015, Trippy recorded Stripped and Strange Love respectively, with We the Kings. Self Titled Nostalgia and Six were released in 2017 and 2018 respectively. Trippy has performed across the United States on the Vans Warped Tour as the bass player for We the Kings. As a member of the band, We the Kings, Trippy has received Platinum record by Australian Recording Industry Association. In 2016, he received Platinum certification from RIAA for "Check Yes Juliet". In 2017 and 2018, Trippy received Gold certifications for Strange Love and "Sad Song" from RIAA.

== Personal life ==
In March 2012, Trippy was diagnosed with a benign oligodendroglioma brain tumor after having a seizure at the end of February. After the successful resection of the tumor, it recurred in September 2013 and was diagnosed as anaplastic oligodendroglioma brain cancer. His wife at the time, Alli Speed, helped him through this surgery. In October 2013, Trippy started oral chemotherapy to combat the remaining 5% left after his second resection. In July 2020, he underwent a third brain surgery that removed 100% of the tumor. Trippy filmed and uploaded his brain surgeries on his YouTube channel. His videos received coverage from Salon.

Trippy married Allie Marie Wesenberg in 2017. They have 2 daughters together. The couple was profiled by PETA on May 2, 2018.

== Awards and recognitions ==
Year	Organization	Nominated work	Category	Result
2009	Twitter Shorty Awards	@CharlesTrippy	Humor	Won
2009	Mashable Open Web Awards	Internet Killed Television	Best Online Video Web Series	Won
2009	Mashable Open Web Awards	Surprise Marriage Proposal in Spain!	YouTube Video of The Year	Won
2009	Mashable Open Web Awards	Internet Killed Television	Best Brand Use of YouTube	Won
2010	Teen Choice Awards	Charles Trippy	Choice Web Star	Nominated
2011	Twitter Shorty Awards	@CharlesTrippy	Travel	Nominated
2011	Twitter Shorty Awards	@AlliSpeed	Weird	Won
2012	Twitter Shorty Awards	@CharlesTrippy	Travel	Won
2012	O Music Awards	We the Kings	"Most Innovative Music Video"	Won
2013	Twitter Shorty Awards	@CharlesTrippy	Videoblogger	Nominated
2013	Guinness World Records	Internet Killed Television	Most days of consecutive vlogging	Won
2015	Guinness World Records	Internet Killed Television	Most days of consecutive vlogging 2200 days "updated"	Won
2016	Ripley's Believe it or not	Internet Killed Television	Most days of consecutive vlogging	Won
