= Kardash (disambiguation) =

Kardash is a village in the Quba Rayon of Azerbaijan.

Kardash may also refer to:

- Bill Kardash (1912–1997), Canadian politician
- Mary Kardash (1913–1990s), Canadian Communist and feminist activist
- Vasyl Kardash (born 1973), Ukrainian footballer

== See also ==
- Kardashev (disambiguation)
- Qardash (disambiguation)
- Kardashian family
