= Stuck on Repeat =

Stuck on Repeat may refer to:

- Stuck on Repeat (song), a 2008 song by Little Boots
- Stuck on Repeat (album), a 2010 album by Stereo Skyline
- Stuck on Repeat, a song by Wanessa, from the EP Você não Perde por Esperar
