= Qardash =

Qardash may refer to:

- Nosratabad, Abgarm, Iran, also known as Qardash
- Abdul Nasser Qardash (born 1967), Iraqi-born militant

== See also ==
- Kardash (disambiguation)
- Kardashev (disambiguation)
