= We the Kings (album) =

Studio album by We the Kings
- Released: October 2, 2007 (U.S.); September 8, 2008 (UK)
- Recorded: 2007
- Studios: Mission Sound, Fresh Kills Music
- Genres: Pop punk; power pop; emo pop
- Length: 34:18
- Label: S-Curve
- Producer: S*A*M and Sluggo

We the Kings chronology
Between the Ink and the Paper (2006)	We the Kings (2007)	Smile Kid (2009)

Singles from We the Kings
- 1. "Skyway Avenue" Released: September 13, 2007; 2. "Check Yes Juliet" Released: February 4, 2008; 3. "Secret Valentine" Released: December 16, 2008

We the Kings is the debut studio album by American rock band We the Kings, released on October 2, 2007 in the U.S.

== Background ==
We the Kings formed in 2005 while its members attended Manatee High School. The band's line-up consisted of vocalist Travis Clark, guitarist Hunter Thomsen, bassist Drew Thomsen, and drummer Danny Duncan. In summer, the group toured with Don't Die Cindy. PureVolume, a place where people could upload their music, helped the band's popularity.

We the Kings was produced by S*A*M and Sluggo, and recorded at Mission Sound, and Fresh Kills Music, both in New York City. Sean Gould and Scott Riebling acted as engineers. Lou Giordano mixed almost every track, save for "Secret Valentine", "Check Yes Juliet", and "Stay Young", which were done by Tom Lord-Alge and his assistant Femio Hernandez. Chris Gehringer mastered the album at Sterling Sound, also in New York City. According to Travis Clark, the album was "really guitar driven, with those poppy catchy choruses".

== Release ==
In July 2007, We the Kings supported the White Tie Affair and Fireworks on the Act Like You Know Tour. In September, the group went on the School's for Fools tour across the US, alongside Valencia, Just Surrender and Metro Station. However, partway through the tour Valencia had to drop off the tour due to their vocalist Shane Henderson having strep throat. As a result, Just Surrender headlined the rest of the dates. The group supported Boys Like Girls on their US headlining tour, dubbed Tourzilla, from late September to late October. It was released on October 2, 2007. From mid-January to early March 2008, the band supported Cobra Starship on their North America tour. In April, the band appeared at the Bamboozle Left festival. In June, the band supported Cobra Starship on their US tour, dubbed Really Really Really Ridiculously Good Looking Tour Out to Warped Tour Tour.

Between June and August 2008, the band performed on the Warped Tour. In October and November, the band supported the Academy Is... on their headlining tour of the US. In October, a re-recorded version of "Check Yes Juliet" was posted online. The re-recording's lyrics were altered to include a reference to Tampa Bay Rays. On December 12, a music video was released for "Secret Valentine" through the band's Myspace profile. In February and March 2009, the group went on a headlining US tour, dubbed The Secret Valentine Tour, with support from the Maine, the Cab, There for Tomorrow and VersaEmerge. In April, the band performed on the Bamboozle Roadshow and appeared at The Bamboozle festival in early May. At the end of May, the band performed at the Slam Dunk Festival. In July, the band supported All Time Low on their US east coast tour.

== Reception ==
Professional ratings
Review scores
Source	Rating
AllMusic	3.5/5 stars
MusicOMH	3/5 stars

The album peaked at No. 3 on Billboard's Top Heatseekers chart, and at No. 151 on the Billboard 200. We the Kings was certified platinum by the Australian Recording Industry Association (ARIA) for the shipment of 75,000 copies. Three singles were released from the album. The album's second single "Check Yes Juliet", gained commercial success. It was featured as "The iTunes Single of the Week" in early 2008, and it peaked at No. 84 on the Pop 100 and No. 70 on the Billboard Hot 100 in the US, and No. 26 in Australia where it was certified platinum by the ARIA. Cleveland.com ranked "Check Yes Juliet" at number 60 on their list of the top 100 pop-punk songs.

== Track listing ==
All songs by Travis Clark and Sam Hollander, except "Headlines Read Out..." by Clark.

1. "Secret Valentine" – 3:28
2. "Skyway Avenue" – 3:26
3. "Check Yes Juliet" – 3:40
4. "Stay Young" – 2:49
5. "Whoa" – 2:37
6. "August Is Over" – 3:16
7. "The Quiet" – 3:12
8. "Don't Speak Liar" – 3:01
9. "Headlines Read Out..." – 3:14
10. "All Again for You" – 3:06
11. "This Is Our Town" – 2:29

Deluxe edition bonus tracks

12. "Check Yes Juliet (acoustic)" – 3:56
13. "Skyway Avenue (acoustic)" – 3:50

== Personnel ==
Personnel per booklet.

We the Kings

- Travis Clark – lead vocals, guitar
- Hunter Thomsen – guitar, backing vocals
- Drew Thomsen – bass
- Danny Duncan – drums

Design

- Zach Nicodemo – graphic design, layout
- Mike Ski – art direction
- Shane McCauley – photography

Production

- S*A*M and Sluggo – producer
- Sean Gould – engineer
- Scott Riebling – engineer
- Lou Giordano – mixing (all except tracks 1, 3 and 4)
- Tom Lord-Alge – mixing
- Femio Hernandez – assistant
- Chris Gehringer – mastering

== Charts ==
Album

Chart (2007)	Peak position
U.S. Billboard 200	151
U.S. Billboard Heatseekers Albums	3

Singles

Year	Single	Chart	Position
2008	"Check Yes Juliet"	U.S. Billboard Hot 100	70
2008	"Check Yes Juliet"	U.S. Billboard Pop 100	26
2008	"Check Yes Juliet"	Australian Single Charts	26
2008	"Secret Valentine"	Mainstream Top 40 (Pop Songs)	40

== Certifications ==
Region	Certification	Certified units/sales
Australia (ARIA)	Platinum	70,000^{^}
United States (RIAA)	Gold	500,000^{‡}
^{^} Shipments figures based on certification alone.^{‡} Sales+streaming figures based on certification alone.
