= Just Keep Breathing =

Single by We the Kings

from the album Somewhere Somehow
- Released: April 5, 2013
- Recorded: 2013
- Genre: Pop rock
- Length: 4:05
- Label: S-Curve
- Songwriters: Kevin Bard; Travis Clark; Blake Healy

We the Kings singles chronology
"Say You Like Me" (2012)	"Just Keep Breathing" (2013)	"Find You There" (2013)

"Just Keep Breathing" is a song by American rock band We the Kings, released April 5, 2013, as the first single from their fourth studio album Somewhere Somehow (2013). The song was written by Kevin Bard, Travis Clark, Blake Healy, it discusses how the band's lead singer Travis Clark was bullied as a child. The song peaked at number 92 on the US Billboard Hot 100 chart. It has also peaked at number 63 on the Canadian Hot 100 and number 66 on the UK Singles Chart, becoming their highest charting single there.

== Background ==
In March 2013, the band announced that they would be releasing a new single titled "Just Keep Breathing" the following week. On April 5, 2013, "Just Keep Breathing" was released as the first single from their fourth studio album. The song is about how We the King's lead singer Travis Clark was bullied throughout his childhood. Clark presses for perseverance when faced with ridicule in life.

== Commercial performance ==
"Just Keep Breathing" debuted at number 92 on the Billboard Hot 100 with 48,000 downloads sold, making it the group's highest weekly download total sales, in the United States during their careers. This was the band's first appearance on the Billboard Hot 100 since, 2010's "We'll Be a Dream".

== Critical reception ==
MTV reviewed the song saying, "the inspirational track marks a new direction for the band: after the chiming power-pop chords of 2011's Sunshine State of Mind, "Just Keep Breathing" opens with an echoing U2-style riff and heart-on-sleeve lyrics a touch more cloudy than the band's usual Florida rays. When the band leaps into the whoa-oh-oh chorus, it's as epic as Game of Thrones."

== Charts ==
Chart performance
Chart (2013)	Peak position
Australia (ARIA)	81
Canada Hot 100 (Billboard)	63
Ireland (IRMA)	24
Scotland Singles (OCC)	47
UK Singles (OCC)	66
UK Indie (OCC)	11
US Billboard Hot 100	92
