= Kevin Bard =

American songwriter (born 1990/91)

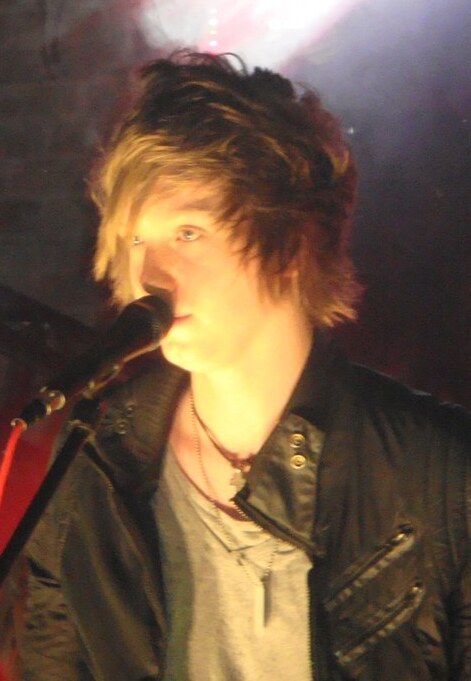

Background information
- Born: Kevin Bard; 1990 or 1991 (age 35–36); East Meadow, New York, United States
- Occupations: Musician; singer-songwriter; producer
- Instruments: Vocals; guitar
- Years active: 2006–present
- Formerly of: Stereo Skyline; Max & Simon

Kevin Bard (born 1990/1991) is an American multi-platinum songwriter and producer born in East Meadow, New York. He is best known as the lead singer of Stereo Skyline and released their debut album Stuck on Repeat under Columbia Records.

== Career ==
With Stereo Skyline, the group released two studio albums, Stuck on Repeat and The Good Life. In June 2009, the band had signed a record deal with Columbia Records. In addition to Stereo Skyline, he formed a music project called Max & Simon with producer Blake Healy and Mark Rosas.

Bard has composed and produced music for several different artists including Dan + Shay, Parmalee, Cody Simpson, Fitz and the Tantrums and Max and Harvey. Bard has also produced music for brands such as Target, Logitech and Jeep.

== Selected discography ==
Artist	Album	Song	Credit	Notes		
Parmalee X Blanco Brown	Just the Way	Just the Way	Songwriter	RIAA Certified Platinum, Music Canada Certified Platinum, Number 1 Country Radio (Most played Song Country Radio 2021) Number 17 Hot A/C Radio, Number 2 Country Radio Australia		
Dan And Shay	Obsessed	How Not To	Songwriter	RIAA Certified Platinum, Number 1 Country Radio		
We The Kings	Somewhere Somehow	Sad Song	Songwriter	RIAA Certified Platinum, Charted 34 on Adult Pop Airplay for 9 weeks		
Andy Grammer	Monster	Still Smiling	Songwriter			
Olivia O'Brien	i should've fucked your brother	i should've fucked your brother	Songwriter			
Redferrin	Jack and Diet Coke	Jack and Diet Coke	Songwriter	RIAA Certified Gold, Spotify's Best Country Songs of 2024		
Lakeview	She Drove Me To A Bar	Eyes Closed	Songwriter			
Atarashii Gakko!	HELLO	HELLO	Songwriter	Featured in The Tiger's Apprentice		
Alih Jey	Más Que	Más Que	Songwriter	Featured in national Target ad campaign		
Roadhouse (feat. Jimmie Allen)	Roadhouse	Talking With Our Hands	Songwriter			
Cody Simpson	Surfers Paradise	Better Be Mind	Songwriter			
Temecula Road	Fades	Fades	Songwriter			
Fitz and the Tantrums	All The Feels	Ain't Nobody But Me	Songwriter			
Wayfarers	Swimming in Stars	Swimming in Stars	Songwriter, Producer	Featured in The Kissing Booth, featured in national ad campaign for Logitech		
Marc Scibilia	On The Way	On The Way	Songwriter, Producer	Featured in national Jeep campaign		
Fitz and the Tantrums	Fitz and The Tantrums	Fadeback	Songwriter			
Max and Harvey	Coming Soon EP	Trade Hearts	Songwriter			
We the Kings	So Far	Just Keep Breathing	Songwriter			
Wayfarers	Just Our Style	Just Our Style	Songwriter	Featured in The Kissing Booth, featured in national ad for FLIPP		
The Summer Set	Legendary	Boomerang	Songwriter			
Jagwar Twin	33	Online	Songwriter			
Cassadee Pope	Thrive	Thrive	Songwriter			
Cheat Codes and Adam Doleac	One Night In Nashville	We'll Break Up	Songwriter, Producer			
Troy Cartwright	Unlove You	Unlove You	Songwriter, Producer			
Ryan and Rory	Ryan and Rory	Pour Decisions	Songwriter, Producer			
Sloejack	Chemical Lie	Chemical Lie	Songwriter, Producer			
Blake Wood	Most Wanted	Most Wanted	Songwriter			
Parmalee, FITZ	For You	Greatest Hits	Songwriter, Producer	The Hot Damns	Heroes (FKA We Are Heroes)	Songwriter
