= Stereo Skyline – EP =

EP by Stereo Skyline
- Released: July 16, 2008
- Studio: Stadiumred, Harlem, New York
- Genre: Pop punk; power pop
- Length: 11:09
- Label: Ozone Entertainment

Stereo Skyline chronology
The Worst Case Scenario (2006)	Stereo Skyline – EP (2008)	Stuck on Repeat (2010)

Singles from Stereo Skyline – EP
- 1. "Heartbeat" Released: 2008

Stereo Skyline is an extended play by American pop rock band Stereo Skyline. It was released on July 16, 2008, and is the group's second EP released.

Only 15,000 physical copies were produced, most of them being sold during touring or available for purchase on the band online store. It was released in 2009, and were published through Ozone Entertainment.

== Background and recording ==
The band signed with Ozone Management in 2007. In winter and spring 2008, the band recorded the EP at Stadiumred in Harlem, New York.

"Heartbeat" was released in 2008, as the EP's first single. The song was written by lead vocalist Kevin Bard when he was 14 years old and the track became the band's most recognizable song. The song was re-recorded and included on their debut studio album, Stuck on Repeat. The fourth track, "Uptown, Get Around" was used on the 2011 Disney Channel film The Suite Life Movie.

== Promotion ==
In support of the EP's release, the group performed at the Bamboozle Festival in 2009. The band toured with Hey Monday during the summer of 2009.

== Commercial performance ==
Despite its lack of chart success, the EP managed to sell 12,000 copies in the US and 150,000 downloads.

== Track listing ==
No.	Title	Length
1.	"Shake and Shout"	3:03
2.	"Heartbeat"	2:44
3.	"Five-tens in Harlem"	2:44
4.	"Uptown, Get Around"	2:37
Total length:		11:09

== Personnel ==
Credits adapted from album's liner notes.

Stereo Skyline

- Matt Villani – guitar, vocals
- Kevin Bard – guitar, lead vocals
- Rob Michelsen – drums
- Jay Moratta – bass

== Release history ==
Release formats for Stereo Skyline
Region	Date	Format(s)	Label	Ref.
Various	July 16, 2008	Digital download	Self-released	
United States	September 1, 2009	CD	Ozone Entertainment	
