= Somewhere Somehow (album) =

Studio album by We the Kings
- Released: December 16, 2013
- Recorded: 2013 in Los Angeles, California
- Genre: Pop
- Length: 50:49
- Label: Ozone Entertainment
- Producer: Steve Shebby; Travis Clark; Blake Healy; David Immerman

We the Kings chronology
Party, Fun, Love, and Radio EP (2012)	Somewhere Somehow (2013)	Stripped (2014)

Singles from Somewhere Somehow
- 1. "Just Keep Breathing" Released: April 5, 2013; 2. "Find You There" Released: May 5, 2013; 3. "Any Other Way" Released: June 15, 2013; 4. "Art of War" Released: December 10, 2013

Somewhere Somehow is the fourth studio album by American rock band We the Kings. It is the first album without bassist Drew Thomsen, who was replaced by Charles Trippy. Keyboardist Coley O'Toole was also added into the lineup. After parting ways with S-Curve Records, the group released the single "Just Keep Breathing" in April 2013. Over the next couple of months, the band released "Find You There" and "Any Other Way" as singles before going on the Summer Fest tour. In late September, the band started a campaign to crowd-fund their next album; it eventually received over $149,000 from 2,309 people. The band recorded in Los Angeles, California, working with Blake Healy, Steve Shebby and David Immerman, all of whom co-wrote and produced songs on the album.

The album was announced for release with the title Vitam Regum, before it was changed to Somewhere Somehow a week later. "Art of War" was released as a single in early December. Somewhere Somehow was released on December 16 through Ozone Entertainment. Following a U.S. tour in March 2014, the group toured Japan and Australia, before joining Warped Tour. A music video was released for "That Feeling" in mid-January 2015. Somewhere Somehow peaked at number 44 on the Billboard 200, and reached the top 10 on several other Billboard charts. It also charted in the top 20 on several UK charts. Despite receiving a mixed critical reception, Clark regarded the album as "a huge success!"

== Background ==
Following the release of Sunshine State of Mind (2011), bassist Drew Thomsen left We the Kings, citing exhaustion from touring. The band recruited Charles Trippy to replace Thomsen and brought in keyboardist Coley O'Toole, both of whom the band knew from the Bradenton music scene. The band toured throughout 2012, leaving them little time to compose new material. Vocalist/guitarist Travis Clark managed to write one new song during the Christmas break, "Just Keep Breathing". The group parted ways with their previous record label S-Curve in 2013.

After consulting their manager, Bret Disend, We the Kings released "Just Keep Breathing" as a single on April 5, 2013. Considered a success by Broadway World, the song would go on to sell over 149,000 copies in one month. Following this up a month later, the group released "Find You There" on May 5. It would go on to sell 93,000 copies. By this point, the band had four songs demoed. A month later, the band released "Any Other Way" on June 15. In July and August, the band went on the Summer Fest tour, with support from Breathe Carolina, The Ready Set and T. Mills.

== Composition ==
Clark said the freedom of working without a label "lent a sense of relaxation to the [writing] process and a stress-free environment." Not wishing to write the same album twice, Clark explained that the band "wanted [the new album] to feel 'groovy'", so he spent more time composing the songs. The album's sound has been described as pop by professional reviewers. According to Clark, "Find You There" is about "find[ing] that one special person/or thing that gives [someone] their life purpose." "Art of War" was written for inclusion on The Hunger Games soundtrack (2012), but was left off. "Just Keep Breathing" is about being bullied as child for having red hair.

Clark co-wrote every song on the album with outside writers. "Queen of Hearts", "That Feeling", and "Phoenix Hearts" were co-written with Steve Shebby. "Find You There", "I Feel Alive", "I Like It", "See You in My Dreams", and "Say It Now" were co-written with Blake Healy. "Die Young Live Forever" was co-written with Healy and Ryan Daly. "Any Other Way" was co-written with Healy and Fransisca Hall. "Art of War" was co-written with Healy, Kevin Bard, Taylor Clark, and Dylan Quagliato. "Sad Song" was co-written with Bard and David Immerman, and "Just Keep Breathing" was co-written with Healy and Bard.

== Production ==
We the Kings planned to release one single per month but they grew impatient. They decided to dedicate two months of studio time to writing a new album. On September 26, 2013, We the Kings set up a crowd-funding campaign on the website IndieGoGo to record a new album with a target goal of $35,000. The band offered 12 perks to fans who could receive rewards for their contribution such as a "Thank You" in the album's credits section, or spending a day in the studio. While the campaign ran for 30 days, the goal was met within 24 hours. The group received $67,000 in a matter of two days and eventually received at total of $149,483 from 2,309 contributors. Initially, the group thought that this figure was an error. After being contacted, IndieGoGo confirmed the amount was correct. Clark commented that their fans "can expect this to be the best album we've ever made, because there are no strings attached. We are the ones deciding everything about this album and with your help we can truly make the best WTK album yet."

Recording took place in Los Angeles, California. All of the album's songs except for "Queen of Hearts", "That Feeling", "Phoenix Hearts", and "Sad Song" were produced by Blake Healy and Clark. "Queen of Hearts", "That Feeling" and "Phoenix Hearts" were produced by Steve Shebby and Clark. "Sad Song" was produced by David Immerman, Shebby, and Clark. Joe Bucci performed additional drums on "Queen of Hearts". "Die Young Live Forever" features guitar parts by Jose Carreon of TheKingsMen, who had contributed enough money to the IndieGoGo project to allow him to record with the band. "Sad Song" features guest vocals by singer-songwriter Elena Coats. Mixing was done by Jeff Julliano at Fused, located in Harbeson, Delaware. Additional editing was done by Garrett Davi. The album was mastered by Brad Blackwood at Euphoric Mastering.

== Release ==
On November 26, 2013, the band announced their new album, Vitam Regum, for release. On December 3, it was announced that the band had changed the album title to Somewhere Somehow. Two days later, the band revealed the album's artwork. On December 10, the single "Art of War" was released. Five days later, a lyric video was released for "Art of War". Somewhere Somehow was released on December 16 through Ozone Entertainment and We the Kings. Some of the money raised from the crowd-funded campaign went towards marketing the album.

On January 30, 2014, the band released a lyric video for "I Like It". In March, the band went on a tour of the U.S. titled The Art of Tour with support from This Century and Crash the Party. Following this, the band toured Japan and Australia. From mid-June to early August, the band went on the 2014 edition of Warped Tour. Eight of the album's songs were re-recorded acoustically for inclusion on Stripped, which was released in November 2014. On January 16, 2015, the band released a music video for "That Feeling".

== Reception ==
=== Critical response ===
Professional ratings
Review scores
Source	Rating
AllMusic	3.5/5 stars
Newsday	B+
SoSoActive	4/10

AllMusic reviewer Mark Deming called the album a "polished, heartfelt set of contemporary pop" with the group's "most accessible work to date." Reviewing the album for Newsday, Glenn Gamboa called it the group's "best album yet", complete with "strong pop hooks and pristine production." Gamboa noted that the band was continually improving their "sound, making everything catchier and harder-hitting." Marcus Clark of SoSoActive called the "over produced pop" backing tracks "decent but I just can't [enjoy] it." Referring to the album as "pop garbage with no kind of appeal", he was unsure why the album was as popular as it was.

=== Commercial performance and legacy ===
Somewhere Somehow sold more copies on its release than the group's previous three albums, debuting at number 44 on the Billboard 200. It also charted at number 3 on the Independent Albums chart, number 5 on the Alternative Albums chart, number 6 on the Top Rock Albums chart, and number 8 on the Digital Albums chart. In the UK, the album charted at number 88 on the Albums Chart, number 17 on the Downloads Chart, number 7 on the Independent Albums Chart, and number 1 on the Independent Albums Breakers Chart. The album also charted at number 81 on the Scottish Albums Chart. Clark later called it "a huge success!"

In 2015, the group found out that "Sad Song" had become their most popular song, despite the song not having a music video nor being performed live on tour. They noticed that the song had accumulated around 20 million plays on Spotify, which Clark initially presumed to be a mistake. Previously, "Check Yes Juliet" was the group's most popular song, selling 2,000 copies per week. "Sad Song", however, was selling 3,000 copies per week. Clark called it "so strange. [...] I just remember finding out that it happened and just being so blown away that for once in our career, we let our fans choose, kind of accidentally, which song we were going to go with." "Sad Song" was certified gold by the Recording Industry Association of America (RIAA) in March 2018. It was certified silver by the British Phonographic Industry in September 2023.

== Track listing ==
Credits per booklet.

1. "Queen of Hearts" (Travis Clark, Steve Shebby) – 3:34
2. "Find You There" (Clark, Blake Healy) – 3:40
3. "I Feel Alive" (Clark, Healy) – 3:52
4. "I Like It" (Clark, Healy) – 3:19
5. "That Feeling" (Clark, Shebby) – 3:58
6. "See You in My Dreams" (Clark, Healy) – 4:29
7. "Die Young Live Forever" (Clark, Healy, Ryan Daly) – 3:13
8. "Phoenix Hearts" (Clark, Shebby) – 4:04
9. "Any Other Way" (Clark, Healy, Fransisca Hall) – 3:44
10. "Say It Now" (Clark, Healy) – 4:22
11. "Art of War" (Clark, Healy, Kevin Bard, Taylor Clark, Dylan Quagliato) – 4:35
12. "Sad Song" (feat. Elena Coates) (Clark, Bard, David Immerman) – 3:46
13. "Just Keep Breathing" (Clark, Healy, Bard) – 4:05

== Personnel ==
Personnel per booklet, except where noted.

We the Kings

- Travis Clark – lead vocals, guitar
- Hunter Thomsen – guitar
- Charles Trippy – bass guitar
- Danny Duncan – drums
- Coley O'Toole – keys, guitar, backing vocals

Additional musicians

- Joe Bucci – additional drums (track 1)
- Jose Carreon – additional guitar (track 7)

Production

- Garrett Davi – additional editing
- Brad Blackwood – mastering
- Evan Blaire – art direction
- Josiah Van Dien – photography
- Steve Shebby – producer (tracks 1, 5, 8 and 12)
- Travis Clark – producer (all tracks)
- Blake Healy – producer (tracks 2–4, 6, 7, 9–11 and 13)
- David Immerman – producer (track 12)
- Jeff Juliano – mixing

== Chart performance ==
Chart (2015)	Peak position
Scottish Albums Chart	81
UK Albums Chart	88
UK Downloads Chart	17
UK Independent Albums Chart	7
UK Independent Albums Breakers Chart	1
U.S. Billboard 200	44
U.S. Billboard Alternative Albums	5
U.S. Billboard Digital Albums	8
U.S. Billboard Independent Albums	3
U.S. Billboard Top Rock Albums	6
