= We the Kings =

American rock band

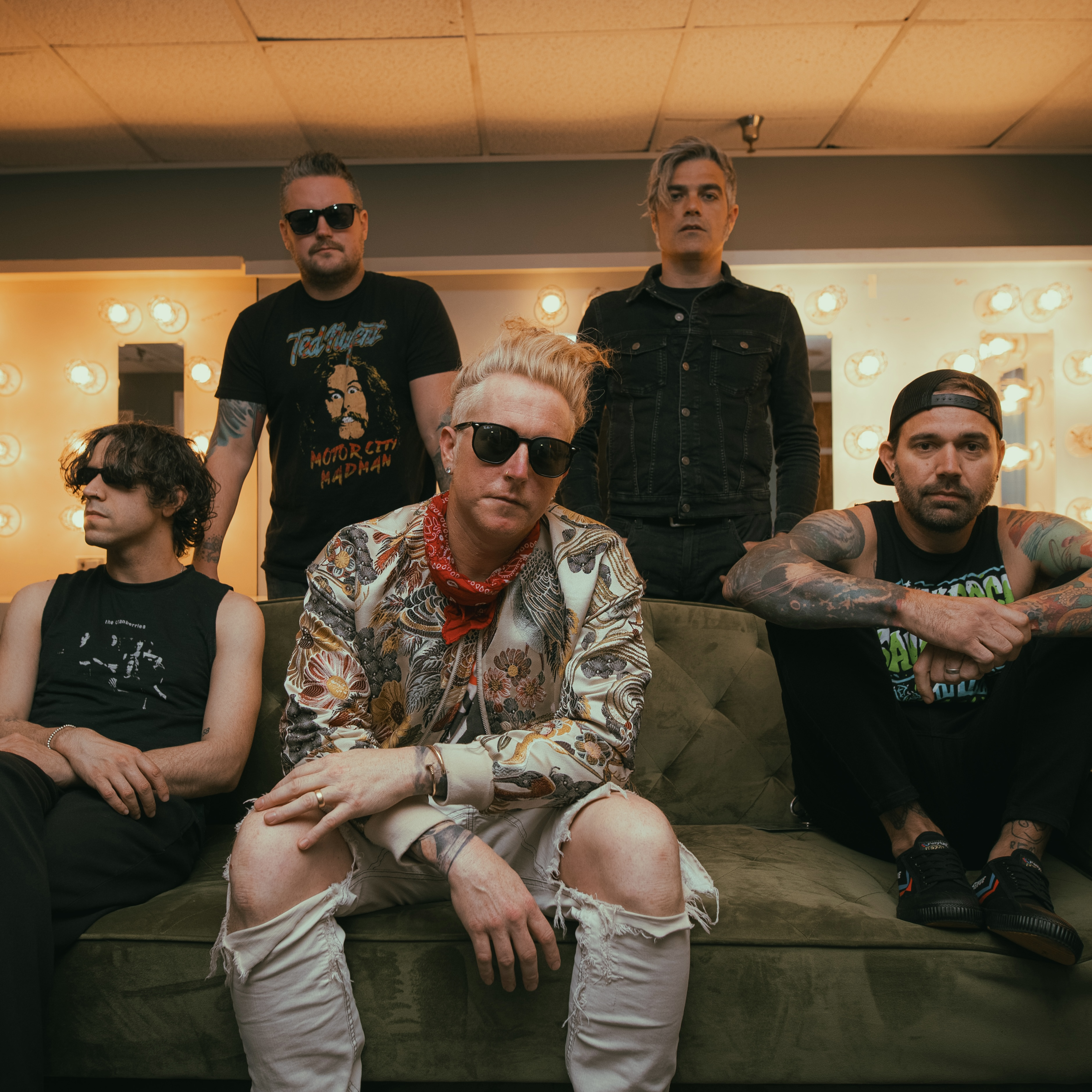
- We the Kings in 2025

Background information
- Also known as: Broken Image, De Soto
- Origin: Bradenton, Florida, U.S.
- Genres: Pop-punk; pop rock; alternative rock; emo pop
- Years active: 2005–present
- Labels: S-Curve; Ozone Entertainment; BMG
- Members: Travis Clark; Charles Trippy; Coley O'Toole; Sebastian Quintero
- Past members: Drew Thomsen; Danny Duncan; Hunter Thomsen
- Website: wethekingsmusic.com

We the Kings is an American rock band formed in Bradenton, Florida, in 2005. The band's eponymous full-length debut album, released in 2007, included the triple-platinum single "Check Yes Juliet", and went on to sell over 250,000 copies in the US. The group's second album Smile Kid (2009) included Top 40 singles "Heaven Can Wait" and "We'll Be a Dream" (featuring Demi Lovato), as well as the single "She Takes Me High".

The band's third album Sunshine State of Mind was released in 2011 and featured the MTV Video Music Award winner for Most Innovative Music Video of the Year for the group's interactive music video and song "Say You Like Me". The band then completed a worldwide tour with Canadian band Simple Plan and performed across the US as a main stage headliner on the Vans Warped Tour. The group's fourth album Somewhere Somehow was released in late 2013 and includes singles "Just Keep Breathing", "Find You There", "Any Other Way", and "Art of War". Their fifth studio album, Strange Love, was released on November 20, 2015. It features the single "Runaway".

== History ==
=== Early years, formation, Broken Image and We the Kings (2005–2008) ===
Friends since childhood, the four bandmates (singer/guitarist Travis Clark, guitarist Hunter Thomsen, his brother bassist Drew Thomsen, and drummer Danny Duncan) formed the group while attending high school. The band got its name from the middle school that all the members attended called Martha B. King Middle School. Before the band was known as We the Kings, the group went by the name Broken Image. The band's first tour was with Don't Die Cindy in the summer of 2005 where the group went by Broken Image, then later went under the moniker De Soto. The band A Heartwell Ending (later renamed Call the Cops) supported for the final leg of the tour. While teaming with Bret Disend in fall of 2005, We the Kings went on its first tour under that name as a five-piece, with the then-unknown Boys Like Girls as the group supported the new release of the Great Escape music video. We the Kings played on its first headlining tour Long Hair Don't Care with Valencia, The Cab, Sing It Loud, and Charlotte Sometimes during late March and throughout April. In May and June, We the Kings supported Cute Is What We Aim For and Boys Like Girls on the group's UK tour.

Under the guidance of manager Bret Disend, the band placed a number of tracks on the social networking site PureVolume in 2007 to build online buzz. Meanwhile, the band also pursued a deal with EMI's imprint S-Curve Records, which eventually signed the group. We the Kings' self-titled debut album was produced by Sam Hollander and mixed by Lou Giordano, and was released in October 2007. The album peaked at number 151 on the Billboard 200 and spent fifteen weeks on the chart. The second single from the album, Check Yes Juliet, became a minor hit, peaking at number seventy on the Billboard Hot 100 and number twenty-five on the Pop Airplay chart. The single was later released in Australia in 2011 where it peaked at number twenty-six and was certified platinum by the Australian Recording Industry Association (ARIA). The album was also released in 2011 and was certified platinum by the ARIA for sales of 70,000 copies.

For part of the fall of 2007, the band played a tour called Tourzilla with headliner Boys Like Girls, All Time Low, and The Audition. The group toured in support of Cobra Starship in early 2008 along with Metro Station and The Cab. We the Kings performed all dates of the Warped Tour 2008. On August 30, 2008 the band was a part of The Rays Summer Concert Series, playing on the field after a Tampa Bay Rays game. In late 2008, after completion of the Warped Tour, the band toured the US and UK with The Academy Is... (the tour was known as Bill & Trav's Bogus Journey), along with supporting bands including The Maine, Hey Monday and Carolina Liar.

The Kings Carriage are skits that We The Kings film and post on YouTube. The King's Carriage detail the band's life on the road and give the fans insight into the band members' lives. These skits have generated over 300 million views.

=== Smile Kid (2009–2010) ===
In February 2009, the band headlined a tour called The Secret Valentine Tour with The Maine, The Cab, There for Tomorrow, and Versa. We the Kings played in the 2009 Bamboozle Roadshow Tour. It began on April 3 at Hoodwinked in California, touring from April through May 2, ending at The Bamboozle in East Rutherford, NJ. Bands also playing the Bamboozle Road Show tour included Forever the Sickest Kids, The Cab, Never Shout Never, and Mercy Mercedes. On July 8, 2009, the band began its tour as support for All Time Low along with Cartel and Days Difference. The band also performed at Warped Tour 2009. The band was on tour in Fall 2009, again supporting All Time Low on the Glamour Kills Tour, with Hey Monday and The Friday Night Boys. The group's sophomore album, which was released in December 2009, reached 112 on the Billboard 200 and spent three weeks on the chart. It spawned the lead single, "Heaven Can Wait", which peaked at number thirty on the Pop Songs chart, and a second single featuring Demi Lovato titled "We'll Be a Dream", which peaked at seventy-six on the Billboard Hot 100 and number twenty-three on the Pop Songs chart.

The band's second album, Smile Kid, was released on December 8, 2009

In early 2010, the band headlined the Hot Topic Presents: Take Action Tour with There for Tomorrow, A Rocket to the Moon, Mayday Parade, and Stereo Skyline. We the Kings also played with New Found Glory at Fitchburg State College's annual spring concert. In March 2010, We the Kings supported You Me at Six, an English pop rock band, on the group's UK headline tour along with Forever the Sickest Kids. The band has also played in Warped Tour 2010 from June 26 to August 2. After Warped Tour, the band plan on a world tour in 2011. In April 2010 the band performed a benefit concert with fellow pop punk band Voted Most Random at a local venue in New Haven, Connecticut. The event raised thousands of dollars for ClearWater Initiative and was the organization's biggest fundraiser up to that date. In June 2010, We the Kings performed at 93Q Summer Jam, a concert in Baldwinsville, New York at the Papermill island. The band performed with Cartel, Jaicko, Mayday Parade, New Boyz, Shontelle and Spose. The group performed "Secret Valentine" along with a few other songs and closed with "Check Yes Juliet".

=== Sunshine State of Mind and lineup changes (2011–2012) ===
From February 4–15, 2011, We the Kings toured the UK in ten different cities, with the Manchester performance being one of the first to sell out. The band was supported by Versaemerge, All Forgotten and I See Stars throughout the whole tour. Later that same month, the band toured in the Philippines with The Maine and Never Shout Never. The group toured Australia in early March 2011, including performing at the Soundwave festival. The band also headlined two sold-out sideshows in Sydney and Melbourne with The Maine and Never Shout Never. The band went out on the Friday Is Forever Tour in Summer 2011 in support of Smile Kid. The Summer Set, The Downtown Fiction, Hot Chelle Rae and Action Item provided support. In November 2011 at an industry conference hosted by Billboard magazine, Clark joined S-Curve founder and record producer Steve Greenberg to demonstrate an interactive video game based on the band's music and images.

Almost two years after the release of the band's second album, a follow-up, titled Sunshine State of Mind, was released. Preceded by the single "Friday Is Forever", the album became the group's highest charting effort in the United States, debuting and peaking at number 45 on the Billboard 200. The album spawned a second single, "Say You Like Me", which peaked at number 32 on the Pop Songs chart, and number 29 in Australia. The single was later certified gold in Australia for shipments exceeding 35,000.

In October 2011, Charles Trippy and Coley O'Toole joined We the Kings with Trippy playing bass guitar (replacing Drew Thomsen who left the group earlier that year) and O'Toole playing keyboard and rhythm guitar. Throughout much of 2011 and 2012, the band toured various countries on numerous tours including the End of the World Tour, performing with Anarbor, The Downtown Fiction and Mayday Parade. The group then toured countries in Europe, including Sweden, Denmark, Spain, Finland, Switzerland, The Netherlands, Germany, France, Austria, Hungary, Serbia, Italy, Portugal and the United Kingdom. The band also toured the east coast of Australia as a supporting act for Simple Plan. We the Kings played tour dates at the Vans Warped Tour 2012.

The band performed at NoCAPRICHO 2012 in September alongside bands We Are the In Crowd and Before You Exit in São Paulo, Brazil. The band also made a stop in Rhode Island to perform at Roger Williams University.

=== Somewhere Somehow and Stripped (2013–2015) ===
In January 2013, We the Kings began recording the group's fourth album. Clark recorded parts in California with Duncan, Hunter Thomsen, and O'Toole, while Trippy recorded bass tracks in Florida using Boyce Avenue's studio. During February, the band headlined another tour throughout Europe, visiting numerous countries including the United Kingdom, The Netherlands, Germany, Italy and Switzerland. By March 2013, the band members announced that a new song would be released in the first week of April. The song, "Just Keep Breathing", is about how frontman Clark had been bullied as a kid. "Just Keep Breathing", released on April 5, reached number 101 on the UK Singles Chart and number 13 in the Official Alternative chart after only three days of sales. The single climbed 63 places to number 38 on the mid-week chart for April 10. The second single, "Find You There", was released on May 3. The band's third single, "Any Other Way" was released on June 14. On September 1, 2013, the band finished the Summerfest 2013 tour with Breathe Carolina, T. Mills, and The Ready Set.

On November 22, 2013, We the Kings announced the title of the group's upcoming fourth album would be Vitam Regum. On November 26, Charles Trippy announced on Twitter that Vitam Regum would be released on December 16, 2013. On December 2, however, the band announced via Twitter the name of the album had changed to Somewhere Somehow. The band released the fourth single for Somewhere Somehow, entitled "Art of War", on December 9, 2013. After its first week of release as an iTunes exclusive the album debuted at 44 on the Billboard 200 and at 88 on the UK Albums Chart.

On February 18, 2014, Clark announced via YouTube that the band would be traveling on Warped Tour 2014. We the Kings also performed on the SlamDunk Fest 2014 alongside bands such as The All-American Rejects.

After Warped Tour 2014, Clark started working on new songs as well as re-recording songs from the previous album for an acoustic album. The album, Stripped, featured acoustic versions of songs from Somewhere Somehow, as well as some new material, including "Stone Walls" and the bonus track, "Is This the End?". The album was fully released on November 24, 2014. We the Kings completed a short, Florida-only tour for this album, and released a lyric video for "Stone Walls".

=== Strange Love, return to S-Curve Records, and So Far (2015–2016) ===
In February 2015, Clark, O'Toole, and Thomsen started tracking guitar and vocals for the fifth album in O'Toole's studio in Connecticut. On March 2, 2015 Duncan entered the studio in Los Angeles to track drums, and finished on March 4. In an interview, Clark said the album was ninety percent finished, and was being mixed. On August 25, 2015, Trippy started tracking bass for the album in his home studio in Tampa Bay, Florida. He previewed a song off the album titled “From Here to Mars” on his YouTube vlog series, "Internet Killed Television". Blake Healy of Metrostation, who produced Somewhere Somehow, also produced this album. On September 20, Elena Coats entered the studio to record vocals for a track on the new album called “XO”. Coats was also featured on a track off of the previous record, Somewhere Somehow, called “Sad Song”. On October 4, Clark previewed a song off of the new album titled “All The Way” in his YouTube vlog.

On October 4, We The Kings announced that the album's release date would be November 20, 2015. The group also announced a headlining Australian tour for February 2016. On October 24, 2015 We The Kings announced Strange Love as the album's title and revealed its cover art. The first single off of the album, "Love Again", came out October 30, as well as the pre-order. The second single off of the album, “Runaway” was available on November 6. The album was released on November 20.

In January 2016, We The Kings released a video announcing a U.S. headlining tour that would go from March to April 2016 called the From Here To Mars Tour. Bands AJR and She is We were the opening acts. Coats also came on tour as a special guest to sing “XO” and “Sad Song” with We The Kings as well as perform her own music. Brothers James, a band consisting of We The Kings members Coley O'Toole and Hunter Thomsen, also performed on the tour.

In February 2016, We The Kings put out a single called “The Story of Tonight”. The song was a cover of a song from the popular musical Hamilton by Lin-Manuel Miranda. The single was released on S-Curve Records, the record label on which the band had released their first three albums. “The Story of Tonight” is the band's first single to go to radio since “Say You Like Me” in 2011. After the band returned home from their Australian tour in March 2016, a music video was filmed for “The Story Of Tonight”. The music video debuted on The American Top 40 with Ryan Seacrest on April 12, 2016.

We The Kings is scheduled to perform on the Vans Warped Tour 2016. The group released a compilation album, So Far, on June 17, 2016.

=== Self-Titled Nostalgia, and Six (2016–present) ===
In September 2016, Travis Clark announced that he was writing music for a new We the Kings album in his studio in Orlando, Florida. He also posted pictures to Instagram with the caption "This is what writing/recording through all hours of the night looks like for new We The Kings music. Yay for more/new songs! Yay for the studio being in my house! Who's excited?"

On December 5, 2016, We the Kings announced a tour that will commemorate the ten year anniversary of their debut album, We the Kings, that was released in 2007. The tour will go from February to May 2017 with 32 dates in the US, 3 dates in the UK, and 1 date in Canada.

On September 12, 2017, We the Kings released a tenth anniversary album called Self-Titled Nostalgia. The album is composed of reworked versions of all the songs that appeared on the band's debut studio album, We the Kings. It also includes one new song called "Planes, Trains, and Cars".

On December 1, 2017, We the Kings released a new single called "Festival Music".

In December 2017, We the Kings released a video announcing the start of production for their sixth studio album. The album was announced to include "Planes, Trains, and Cars", "Festival Music", and eight to ten more songs. Like the previous two We The Kings records, this album was released without a label. To fund the album, the band offered multiple packages for fans to purchase on PledgeMusic. The packages included items such as a vinyl record of the album, the ability to name a song on the album, a bass guitar used by Charles Trippy, a guitar used by Travis Clark, and more. Each person who purchased a package had their face placed on the album cover along with the band members' faces in a yearbook format. The album was released July 6, 2018.

In 2019, We the Kings played at the final warped tour (Warped Tour 25).

On February 2, 2024, Danny Duncan announced his departure from the band.

In September 2024, We the Kings covered "Go the Distance" for A Whole New Sound, a compilation album featuring pop-punk covers of songs from classic Disney films.

The band are confirmed to be making an appearance at Welcome to Rockville, which will take place in Daytona Beach, Florida in May 2026.

== Personal lives ==
Travis Clark is married to Jenny Robinson Clark; they have four kids (3 girls and 1 boy). Coley O'Toole is married to Monika and together they have a son and two daughters. Charles Trippy is married to Allie Wesenberg since March 11, 2017, and they have two daughters. Danny Duncan has two sons with wife Valentina Guerrero. Hunter Thomsen is married to Caitlin; they have two sons.

== Musical style ==
We the King's music style has generally been regarded as pop-punk, pop rock, alternative rock, emo, power pop, and pop.

== Band members ==
Current members

- Travis Clark – lead vocals, guitar, keyboards, piano (2005–present)
- Charles Trippy – bass guitar, backing vocals (2011–present)
- Coley O'Toole – keyboards, guitar, backing vocals (2011–present)
- Sebastian Quintero – drums, percussion (2024–present)

Former members

- Drew Thomsen – bass guitar, backing vocals (2005–2011)
- Danny Duncan – drums, percussion, backing vocals (2005–2024)
- Hunter Thomsen – guitar, backing vocals (2005–2025)

Touring members

- JJ Tiberio – guitar, bass guitar (2012)
- Josh Del Barrio – guitar, bass guitar (2013–2015)
- Chris Hodge – acoustic guitar (2015)
- Kortney Greenwood – bass guitar (2015)
- Ryan Sofie – guitar (2016)

== Discography ==
Studio albums

- We the Kings (2007)
- Smile Kid (2009)
- Sunshine State of Mind (2011)
- Somewhere Somehow (2013)
- Strange Love (2015)
- Six (2018)

== Awards ==
Year	Award	Category	Work	Result
2008	Rock on Request Awards	"Best Pop Punk Artist"	We the Kings	Won
2010	Teen Choice Awards	"Choice Hook Up" (shared with Demi Lovato)	"We'll Be a Dream"	Nominated
2012	O Music Awards	"Most Innovative Music Video"	Say You Like Me	Won
