= The Kardashev Scale (album) =

Type I : The Kardashev Scale

Studio album by Greydon Square
- Released: August 10, 2010
- Recorded: 2008–2010
- Genre: Hip hop
- Length: 1:07:58

Greydon Square chronology
The C.P.T. Theorem (2008)	Type I : The Kardashev Scale (2010)	Type II : The Mandelbrot Set (2012)

Type I : The Kardashev Scale is the third studio album by rapper Greydon Square. It is his third studio album assuming his current title, and is also the third album in the Quintilogy which also encompasses albums The Compton Effect and The C.P.T. Theorem. It features notable features from rappers such as Gripp and Canibus. The album's title, like Greydon's previous two albums, is the actual name of a scientific theory. The Kardashev scale in fact comes from a theory surrounding humanity's ability to harness universal energy; it was forwarded by Russian astronomer Nikolai Kardashev.

== Track listing ==
No.	Title	Producer(s)	Length
1.	"Star View"	Traumah	3:35
2.	"War Porn (feat. Canibus)"	Traumah	2:46
3.	"Onward"	Traumah	3:44
4.	"The Kardashev Scale"	Greydon Square	3:30
5.	"Speak to Him (feat. Gripp)"	Surreal	4:20
6.	"Brains"	Traumah	4:08
7.	"Myth"	Greydon Square	3:50
8.	"2010 A.D. (feat. Syqnys & Taskrok)"	Traumah	4:05
9.	"Proof of Concept"	Greydon Square	4:10
10.	"Here's Why I Don't Believe... (Interlude)"	Greydon Square	1:06
11.	"Man-Made God"	Traumah & Greydon Square	3:42
12.	"Stockholm Syndrome"	Greydon Square	3:59
13.	"Black Atheist (feat. Noob)"	Greydon Square	4:39
14.	"Special Pleading"	Greydon Square	3:36
15.	"World Around Us"	Truamah	4:16
16.	"As An Artist"	Greydon Square	4:32
17.	"Final Notes"	Doug Fenske	3:41
18.	"A.I.M. (Anti-Injustice Music)"	Traumah	1:45
19.	"Dopamine Kata"	Doug Fenske	2:34
Total length:			1:07:58
