= Smile Kid =

Studio album by We the Kings
- Released: December 8, 2009
- Recorded: 2009
- Genre: Pop punk; pop rock; power pop; pop
- Length: 42:14
- Label: S-Curve; Virgin
- Producer: S*A*M and Sluggo

We the Kings chronology
| Secret Valentine EP (2008) | Smile Kid (2009) | Sunshine State of Mind (2011) |

Singles from Smile Kid
- 1. "Heaven Can Wait" Released: October 13, 2009; 2. "We'll Be a Dream" Released: July 16, 2010; 3. "She Takes Me High" Released: November 2010

Smile Kid (stylized as Smile Kid シ) is the second studio album by American rock band We the Kings, released through S-Curve Records on December 8, 2009. The album title comes from a lyric in the song "The Story of Your Life".

== Background ==
Travis Clark said "Everything had an anthemic sound to it." The lyrics Clark wrote for Smile Kid "were just so in-depth and meaningful to me personally". Smile Kid was "more experimental [compared to the first album] with piano, horns, strings and even a whistle."

== Release ==
"Heaven Can Wait" was released as a single on October 13, 2009 and charted at number 18 on the Billboard Heatseekers Songs chart and at number 32 on the Pop Songs chart. Actress and singer Demi Lovato was also announced to be contributing guest vocals on album's song "We'll Be a Dream" which is the second single off the album. The band undertook a tour of the United States to support the album. Between mid-October and early December, the band went on a US tour alongside All Time Low, Hey Monday and the Friday Night Boys.

The artwork for the album was released on November 8, 2009. Following the release of a false track listing in October, the official track listing was announced on November 17, 2009. The album was also originally scheduled to be released on November 17, but was corrected to be released on December 8, 2009. Pre-orders of Smile Kid were available in two different packages. The album was available for streaming via MySpace on December 8, 2009. From January to March 2010, the band headlined the Take Action Tour. "We'll Be a Dream" was released to mainstream radio on March 2, 2010, and released as a single on July 16. Between late June and early August, the band performed on Warped Tour.

== Reception ==
Professional ratings
Review scores
| Source | Rating |
|---|---|
| AllMusic | 2.5/5 stars |
| Alternative Press | (3/5) |
| Idobi | 3/5 stars |

Alternative Press reviewer Scott Heisel rated the album 3/5, saying that "Fans of We the Kings' debut will undoubtedly find something to hold on to with Smile Kid, but for those who were less than enamored with the band's pop-punk blend will likely stay that way." He said although the band "have expanded their previously narrow sound", he was still dissuaded by the band's failure to branch out musically; "Until the band are willing to step further outside the musical box, and Clark is willing to belt it out, We the Kings will remain good, not great--and still on the verge of pop-punk royalty."

== Track listing ==
All lyrics are written by Travis Clark; all music is composed by Clark, except where noted.

| No. | Title | Length |
|---|---|---|
| 1. | "She Takes Me High" | 4:06 |
| 2. | "Promise the Stars" (Clark, Sam Hollander, Dave Katz) | 4:36 |
| 3. | "Heaven Can Wait" (Clark, Hollander, Katz) | 3:31 |
| 4. | "The Story of Your Life" (Clark, Hollander, Katz) | 3:32 |
| 5. | "Rain Falls Down" | 4:31 |
| 6. | "Summer Love" | 3:25 |
| 7. | "In-n-Out (Animal Style)" (Clark, Hollander, Katz) | 3:08 |
| 8. | "Spin" | 3:59 |
| 9. | "Anna Maria (All We Need)" | 3:22 |
| 10. | "We'll Be a Dream (featuring Demi Lovato)" | 3:53 |
| 11. | "What You Do to Me" | 4:20 |
| Total length: | | 42:14 |

Deluxe edition bonus tracks
| No. | Title | Length |
|---|---|---|
| 12. | "Heaven Can Wait" (acoustic) | 3:10 |
| 13. | "She Takes Me High" (acoustic) | 4:05 |

Australian edition bonus tracks
| No. | Title | Length |
|---|---|---|
| 12. | "Check Yes Juliet (Run Baby Run)" | 3:40 |
| 13. | "Secret Valentine" | 3:28 |
