= Kardashev =

Kardashev can refer to:

- Nikolai Kardashev (1932–2019), a Russian and Soviet astrophysicist.
- The Kardashev scale, a scale measuring the technological growth of civilization, named after him.
- The Kardashev Scale (album), album by rapper Greydon Square

== See also ==
- Kardash (disambiguation)
