= Greydon Square =

American rapper, producer, sound engineer (born 1981)

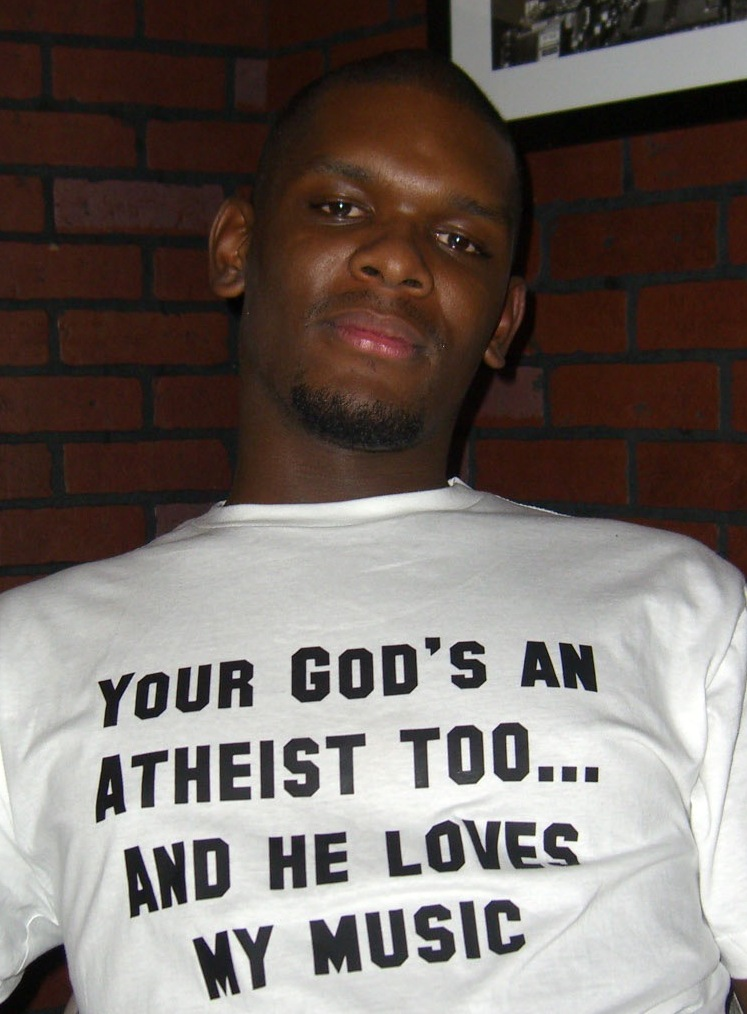
- Square in 2007

Background information
- Also known as: Apocalypse
- Born: Eddie Collins; September 28, 1981 (age 44)
- Origin: Compton, California, US
- Genres: West Coast hip hop
- Occupations: Rapper; producer; audio engineer
- Instrument: Vocals
- Years active: 2004–present
- Website: greydonsquare.com

Eddie Collins (born September 28, 1981), better known by his stage name Greydon Square, is an American rapper, producer and sound engineer from Compton, California. He is an Iraq War veteran, an outspoken atheist, and the owner/co-founder of Majestic Comics. He is an advocate for atheism, critical thinking and rational thought.

== Early life ==
Collins grew up an orphan in Compton, where he was raised in foster homes in the Department of Children and Family Services system. At the age of nine, he taught himself how to play the piano at one of his foster homes. In his teenage years, Collins joined the Tragniew Park Compton Crips, a Compton-based subgroup of the street gang Crips. This led to his arrest and conviction of a weapons-related charge when he was 17. He was incarcerated at Sylmar Juvenile Hall. Of his childhood in the foster care system, he says he "was basically watched, not raised."

Collins enlisted in the United States Army after his release in 2001. He served in the Iraq War attached to the 82nd Airborne Division. He says his time in Iraq has caused him to suffer post-traumatic stress.

After leaving the Army, Collins began studying at Arizona State University, where he focused on computer science. It was during his time at the university Collins began questioning his religious beliefs, leading him to atheism.

"I could easily be just another gangster rapper. That's not where I am. (...) I went to Iraq, I saw people die. It's not a game to me."

— Greydon Square

== Music career ==
With the exception of his first released album, Collins uses his stage name, Greydon Square, for all his musical projects and other aspects of his professional life. He cites as his influences Rakim, Phil Collins, DJ Quik, Dr. Dre, Quincy Jones, Stanley Clarke, Cedric Williams, and The Bee Gees.

=== Musical beginnings: 2004–2006 ===
In 2004, under the name Apocalypse, Square released his first album, Absolute. The album was self-published and has since been discontinued. In 2015, Square re-released two songs from the album, Absolute and Reality.

=== The Compton Effect and The C.P.T. Theorem: 2007–2009 ===
Square's first major album—as well as his first album under the name Greydon Square—was named The Compton Effect and was released in 2007. The title refers to both the physical phenomenon of the same name and the city in which he grew up, Compton. He created his own company to distribute the record, declining offers from several record labels. The following year he released The C.P.T. Theorem, named after the CPT theorem, another concept in the field of physics.

His music deals with philosophical and political issues, the war in Iraq and his experiences as a soldier, and his childhood spent in group homes. His atheistic views are dominant in his albums of this period.

=== The Kardashev Scale Quadrilogy: 2010–2022 ===
In 2010, he released the first of a trilogy of albums, The Kardashev Scale (album), named after the method of measuring a civilization's level of technological advancement. The Type I prefix refers to the scale's classification of civilizations roughly equal to Earth's, and it is also used to identify the album as the first of the trilogy. The album featured the song "War Porn", performed by Square along with hip-hop artist Canibus.

The second album of the trilogy, Type II : The Mandelbrot Set, was released in 2012. In addition to continuing the "Type" naming of the trilogy, the album title references the Mandelbrot set, which is a set of complex numbers used to create fractals. Square added the trilogy in 2015 with the album Omniverse : Type 3 : Aum niverse. The omniverse is the collection of this universe and all other hypothetical "alternate" or "parallel universes".

The latest album of the saga, Type 4: City on the Type of Forever, was released in 2022. In addition to continuing the "Type" naming of the quadrilogy, the album title draws influence from the Star Trek Original Series episode City on the Edge of Forever.

Also during this period, Square collaborated with nerdcore rapper Sai Phi on the album LTGU as well as Sai Phi's debut solo album Dimensions Disassembled, where he appeared alongside Iyosi Pydas and Scientifik.

=== Compton Scattering: 2017–present ===
On November 5, 2017, he released the album Compton Scattering, named after a more general version of the Compton effect. The album, which more closely reflects his earlier works, discusses topics such as politics, cryptocurrency, and anti-natalism.

Square was also a featured artist on the album LTGU, released on August 8, 2017, by the Phoenix, Arizona-based group Low Technology, which Square co-founded in 2007.

== Related projects ==
Square is a member of the international secular hip-hop activist movement and The Anti-Injustice Movement, also known as AIM Clika. With others, he founded the Grand Unified Theory organization, which seeks to educate people about science and rational thinking.

In 2016, Square and rapper Tombstone da Deadman produced a science-fiction comic named Extropy and Entropy, illustrated by Joseph Arnold. The comic is meant to be accompanied by music tracks by Square and Tombstone.

In 2013, he appeared in the documentary film Contradiction, about Christianity in the black community.

== Personal life ==
=== Conflict with Brian Sapient ===
Once an active member of the Rational Response Squad, Square was put on probation in 2008 after he punched leader Brian Sapient at a public event in Washington, D.C. The incident was allegedly sparked by a disagreement over CD sales. During an interview with Phoenix New Times the following year, Square said, "It never ceases to amaze me that when people join a group, they just accept the group position on everything. And I did that, with the Rational Response Squad. I accepted their methods and I accepted their beefs."

== Discography ==
=== Solo albums ===
Title	Album details
Absolute	Released: 2004
The Compton Effect	Released: 2007; Singles: "Squared", "Molotov", "Say", "Extian"
The C.P.T. Theorem	Released: 2008; Singles: "Cubed", "A Soldier's Poem"
Type I: The Kardashev Scale	Released: August 10, 2010; Singles: "Stockholm Syndrome", "Brains", "Myth"
Type II : The Mandelbrot Set	Released: October 16, 2012; Singles: "Peace Peace", "Ultra Combo", "Prison Planet", "Summer's Ending", "Metaphor Swordsman"
Omniverse : Type 3 : Aum niverse	Released: December 21, 2015; Singles: "Omniverse", "Greyshift", "Society Vs Nature"
Compton Scattering	Released: November 5, 2017; Singles: "Signal Through Noise"
Type 4: City on the Type of Forever	Released: September 28, 2022; Singles: "6th", "Hindsight", "Simulacra"
Type 4: Last of the Rhyme Lords	Releases: September 28, 2023; Singles: "TBD"
Type 4: Tour of the Orphaned Knight	Releases: September 28, 2024; Singles: "TBD"
Type 4: Iron Star Era	Releases: September 28, 2025; Singles: "TBD"

=== Collaboration albums ===
Title	Album details
Ryuken Vs - Round 1: Super Arts	Credited for lyrics, under Eddie Collins; Released: June 16, 2014
LTGU	As part of Low Technology; Released: August 8, 2017

== See also ==
- American Atheists
- West Coast hip hop
- List of West Coast hip hop artists
