= A Heartwell Ending =

American post-hardcore band

- Origin: Long Beach, California, U.S.
- Genres: Post-hardcore; Emo
- Years active: 2003–2009; 2026–Present
- Label: Mediaskare Records
- Members: Justin Allen; Will Schuck; Chris Doss
- Past members: Jason Lopez; Robert McCann; Brandon Feldhahn; Stew Richmond; Bill Galvan; Bret Johnson

A Heartwell Ending is an American post-hardcore band formed in Long Beach, California, in 2003. The group came out of the region's MySpace-era emo and post-hardcore scene.

The band started out posting demos online before signing with the independent label Mediaskare Records. Their only studio album, Trust Us, We Lie, came out in 2006. The band toured regionally and nationally through 2008 before breaking up in 2009, after which several members regrouped as the electropop act Call the Cops.

The band experienced a revival in the mid-2020s via streaming and short-form videos.

== History ==
=== Formation and early years (2003–2005) ===
A Heartwell Ending formed in Long Beach in late 2003, consisting of guitarist Greg Hurst and drummer Robert McCann, vocalist Justin Allen and guitarist Bret Johnson. After bassist Jason Lopez joined, the group started writing and recording a full-length debut. Hurst left during the demo sessions and was replaced by guitarist Brandon Feldhahn, who was himself replaced midway through recording by keyboardist Will Schuck. Demo tracks went up on the band's MySpace page in 2004 and 2005.

=== Trust Us, We Lie (2005–2007) ===
The band the attention of Mediaskare Records, a Southern California label known for post-hardcore and metalcore. A Heartwell Ending recorded Trust Us, We Lie at Undercity Recordings with producer Ryan Baker, which was released on August 8, 2006, which included the lead single "If Looks Could Kill". The video for the single was directed by Scott Culver of Drive-Thru Records, who had also worked with artists like Yellowcard, Hellogoodbye and The Early November. To support the record, the band toured with A Day to Remember in November and December 2006.

=== Touring, lineup changes and dissolution (2007–2009) ===
The band experienced several lineup changes including on lead guitar, bass and drums. Guitarist Chris Doss also joined and left during this stretch. (Note: IMDb biography pages are largely self-submitted and are not generally considered a reliable source under WP:RS/IMDB; this citation should be replaced with a stronger source if one becomes available.) The band kept playing regional dates into 2008, before breaking up in 2009. Several of the departing members soon regrouped as the electropop project Call the Cops.

== Reception ==
The bands album garnered generally mixed to positive reviews, and has been compared to artists such as Amber Pacific, Red Jumpsuit Apparatus and Yellowcard.

== Recent activity ==
As of October 2026, A Heartwell Ending has over 600,000 monthly listeners and 130,000 followers on Spotify, with "If Looks Could Kill" surpassing 21 million streams on the platform.

In October 2026, they were announced be on the Welcome to Rockville 2027 lineup, which will mark their first live show in 19 years.

== Members ==
=== Current members ===
- Justin Allen – lead vocals (2003–2009; 2026–present)
- Will Schuck – keyboards, vocals (2005–2009; 2026–present)
- Chris Doss – guitar (2008; 2026–present)

=== Former members ===
- Jason Lopez – bass
- Robert McCann – drums
- Brandon Feldhahn – lead guitar
- Stew Richmond – guitar (later lineup)
- Bill Galvan – drums (later lineup)
- Bret Johnson – guitar (2003–2010)

== Discography ==
- Trust Us, We Lie (2006, Mediaskare Records)

=== Track listing ===
Trust Us, We Lie (2006)
No.	Title	Length
1.	"From Heart and Soul to Pen and Paper"
2.	"Give Up to Give In"
3.	"Trust Us, We Lie"
4.	"Your My Dream Catcher"
5.	"The Secret (Between the Sheets)"
6.	"Memory"
7.	"One More Song for Your MySpace Page"
8.	"If Looks Could Kill"
9.	"There Are Two "R's" in Sorry, but One "R" in Whore"
10.	"Feelings Between the Lines"
11.	"All Along"
