= Strangelove: The Depeche Mode Experience =

American Depeche Mode tribute band

Strangelove: The Depeche Mode Experience, or Strangelove is an American tribute act formed in 2010, reproducing the music of Depeche Mode. The name of the band comes from Depeche Mode's song of the same name.

The band was included in LA Weekly's "The 20 Best Tribute Acts in Los Angeles" in 2015

Strangelove is featured in an episode in the first season of E!'s Clash of the Cover Bands.

The band has headlined in greater than 7,000 seat venues. In addition to many cities across the United States, Strangelove has performed in Mexico, Canada, Italy, Australia, New Zealand, Chile, Ecuador, Dominican Republic, and Depeche Mode's native England.

== Lineup ==
=== Current ===
- Leo Luganskiy as "Ultra-Dave" performing lead vocals in the style of Dave Gahan
- Brent Meyer as "Counterfeit Martin" performing synthesizer, guitar and vocals in the style of Martin Gore
- Kaleb Rankin as "Full Fletch" performing keyboards as Andy Fletcher
- Max Hoppenbrouwers as "E-Max Wilder" performing keyboards as Alan Wilder
- Chris Olivas as "Chris-tian O-gner" performing drums (occasional)

=== Former ===
- James Evans as "In the Fletch" (Andy Fletcher)
- Brian Johnson as "In the Fletch" (Andy Fletcher)
- Jake Jordan as "In the Fletch" (Andy Fletcher)
- Freddie Morales as "Devotional Dave" (Dave Gahan)
- Julian Shah-Tayler as "Oscar Wilder" performing keyboards as Alan Wilder
- David Sepe as "Alan Wildest" (Alan Wilder)
