= Strange Love (We the Kings album) =

Studio album by We the Kings
- Released: November 20, 2015
- Recorded: February–September 2015 in Los Angeles, California; Tampa Bay, Florida; and Hartford, Connecticut
- Length: 43:07
- Labels: Ozone Entertainment, We the Kings
- Producers: Blake Healy, Travis Clark

We the Kings chronology
Stripped (2014)	Strange Love (2015)	So Far (2016)

Singles from Strange Love
- 1. "Love Again" Released: October 30, 2015; 2. "Runaway" Released: November 6, 2015

Strange Love is the fifth studio album by the American rock band We the Kings. It was released on November 20, 2015. The album succeeds the band's commercially successful album, Somewhere Somehow, that was released in December 2013. It was produced by Blake Healy, the former member of Metro Station, who also produced the band's last album. The album was released independently by We the Kings and was distributed by Ozone Entertainment. The album had two singles that promoted its release. “Love Again” was released on October 30, 2015, and “Runaway” was released on November 6, 2015.

== Production ==
In February 2015, Travis, Coley and Hunter started recording guitar and vocals for the fifth album in Coley's studio in Connecticut. On March 2, Danny Duncan began to record drums in Los Angeles and finished two days later. In an interview, Clark said the album was ninety percent finished, and was being mixed. On August 25, Charles Trippy started recording bass guitar for the album in his home studio in Tampa Bay, Florida. He previewed a song from the album titled "From Here to Mars" on his YouTube vlog series, Internet Killed Television. Blake Healy of Metro Station, who produced Somewhere Somehow, also produced this album. On September 20, Elena Coats recorded vocals for a track on the new album called "XO". Coats previously worked with the band performing guest vocals on their song "Sad Song".

== Release ==
On October 4, Clark previewed a song from the new album titled "All the Way" in his YouTube vlog. On October 9, We the Kings announced the album for release. They also announced a headlining Australian tour for February 2016. On October 24, 2015, Trippy announced Strange Love as the album's title and revealed the cover art work. On October 30, the band made clips of songs on the album available for streaming. On November 2, a lyric video was released for "Love Again". "Runaway" was released as a single on November 6. Strange Love was independently released on November 20, 2015, and distributed by Ozone Entertainment.

== Reception ==
In the United States, the album debuted at No. 137 on the Billboard 200, and No. 11 on the Alternative Albums chart, selling 4,000 copies in its first week. It had sold 7,000 copies in the US by June 2016.

== Track listing ==
No.	Title	Length
1.	"Love Again"	2:49
2.	"Howl at the Moon"	4:20
3.	"Completely"	3:57
4.	"Heaven So Close"	4:05
5.	"XO" (feat. Elena Coats)	3:14
6.	"From Here to Mars"	3:50
7.	"All the Way"	2:41
8.	"Jenny's Song"	3:42
9.	"She"	3:37
10.	"Runaway"	4:02
11.	"She" (a cappella mix)	3:36
12.	"XO"	3:14
Total length:		43:07

== Personnel ==
We the Kings

- Travis Clark – lead vocals, rhythm guitar, keyboard
- Hunter Thomsen – lead guitar, backing vocals
- Coley O'Toole – keyboard, rhythm guitar, backing vocals
- Charles Trippy – bass guitar
- Danny Duncan – drums, percussion, backing vocals on "Love Again"
- Elena Coats – guest vocals on "XO"
- Blake Healy – production

== Charts ==
Chart performance
Chart (2015)	Peak position
Australian Digital Albums (ARIA)	39
Australian Hitseekers Albums (ARIA)	1
Canadian Albums (Billboard)	85
Irish Independent Albums (IRMA)	20
UK Albums (Official Charts)	179
UK Independent Albums (Official Charts)	21
UK Rock & Metal Albums (Official Charts)	10
US Billboard 200	137
US Independent Albums (Billboard)	8
US Top Alternative Albums (Billboard)	11
