= Stripped (We the Kings album) =

Studio album by We the Kings
- Released: November 24, 2014
- Recorded: August–September 2014 in Los Angeles, California
- Length: 38:51
- Label: Ozone Entertainment
- Producer: Blake Healy, Travis ClarkColey O’Toole

We the Kings chronology
Somewhere Somehow (2013)	Stripped (2014)	Strange Love (2015)

Stripped is an acoustic album by American rock band We the Kings, and features acoustic versions of eight songs off their previous album, Somewhere Somehow, it was released through Ozone Entertainment on November 24, 2014, on iTunes. It also includes two brand new songs, "Stone Walls" and "Is This the End?".

== Track listing ==
No.	Title	Length
1.	"Just Keep Breathing"	4:07
2.	"Queen of Hearts"	3:34
3.	"I Feel Alive"	4:07
4.	"Sad Song" (feat. Elena Coats)	4:24
5.	"Any Other Way"	3:09
6.	"Art of War"	4:26
7.	"See You in My Dreams"	4:09
8.	"Find You There"	4:28
9.	"Stone Walls"	4:02

Bonus track

No.	Title	Length
10.	"Is This the End?"	2:25

== Personnel ==
We the Kings

- Travis Clark – Lead vocals, rhythm guitar, keyboard
- Hunter Thomsen – Lead guitar, backing vocals
- Coley O'Toole – Keyboard, rhythm guitar, backing vocals
- Charles Trippy – Bass guitar
- Danny Duncan – Drums, percussion

Additional vocals on Stone Walls by crowd during performance at Northwest Missouri State University.

== Charts ==
Chart performance
Chart (2014)	Peak position
UK Album Downloads (OCC)	100
UK Independent Albums (OCC)	38
US Independent Albums (Billboard)	32
