= Stuck on Repeat (album) =

Stuck On Repeat

Studio album by Stereo Skyline
- Released: July 20, 2010
- Studios: Red Bull Studios, Santa Monica, California; Right Hook Productions, New York City, New York; The Cutting Room Studio, New York City, New York; Westlake Studios, Los Angeles, California
- Genre: Power pop
- Length: 20:20
- Label: Columbia
- Producers: Blake Healy; S*A*M and Sluggo; Kevin Bard; Scott Mann; Chad Royce

Stereo Skyline chronology
Stereo Skyline (2008)	Stuck On Repeat (2010)	The Good Life (2011)

Singles from Stuck On Repeat
- 1. "Tongue Tied" Released: June 15, 2010; 2. "Me & You" Released: November 30, 2010

Stuck On Repeat is the debut studio album by American pop rock band Stereo Skyline. It was released on July 20, 2010. The album features the singles "Tongue Tied" and "Me & You". It debuted at number 133 on the Billboard 200 and sold 4,000 copies first week.

== Background and composition ==
The group worked with producers S*A*M and Sluggo, Blake Healy of Metro Station and Adam Schlesinger of Fountains of Wayne on the album. Lead vocalist Kevin Bard stated, "I didn't want our fans to be disappointed in any way, but I wanted them to grow with us."

The album was recorded in Red Bull Studios in Santa Monica, Right Hook Productions and The Cutting Room Studio in New York City and Westlake Studios in Los Angeles. "A Little More Us" was written by Kevin Bard and Adam Schlesinger while production was handled by S*A*M and Sluggo. Bard stated that working with Schlesinger was "surreal." Most of the album was produced by Blake Healy and according to the group they, "learned a lot from him in terms of both music and handling life in the music business." The album title is taken from the lyrics of the third track "Tongue Tied".

== Release ==
"Tongue Tied" was released digitally on June 15, 2010, as the lead single from the album. The music video was released through the group's Facebook page on July 8, 2010, and was released to YouTube on October 29, 2010. The track was written by Bard and Healy and features guest spoken-word vocals from Cassadee Pope during the phone call segment of the song.

"Me & You" was released on November 30, 2010, as the second single from the album. A music video was released in promotion of the single. The video was shot in Venice Beach, California and was aired on TeenNick.

In promotion of the album's release, performed at the 2010 Bamboozle Roadshow, as well as headlining their own tour with The Audition, Cash Cash, The Downtown Fiction and Cady Groves for support. The group also toured with Good Charlotte and Hanson.

== Critical reception ==
Professional ratings
Review scores
Source	Rating
AllMusic	4/5 stars
Alternative Press	3/5 stars

Stuck on Repeat was met with positive reviews from music critics. Tim Sendra of AllMusic gave a positive review for the album praising the catchy choruses of the songs and its use of simple chord progressions, as well as the lyrics. He stated that Bard's vocals, "have a sound that makes The Archies sound like Slayer." He also added, "The eight songs are all memorable, fun, and friendly, played with plenty of upbeat energy and a carefree zest."

Scott Heisel of Alternative Press also gave a positive review stating, "Stereo Skyline deliver slab after slab of nu power-pop, with each sub-three-minute song loaded with Auto-Tuned vocals, cheesy woosh sound effects, the most basic of lyrics and an all-around level of saccharine that makes The Maine sound like Slayer. And yet, this thing doesn't suck." He described the track, "A Little More Us" as a "young Ace Enders fronting the Jonas Brothers." He also compared "Me & You" to Owl City's "Dental Care" for its "unabashedly cheddar moments." He praised the tracks "Tongue Tied" and "Heartbeat" for its instantly likable hooks.

== Commercial performance ==
Stuck on Repeat peaked at number 133 on the Billboard 200. The album also debuted at number four on the US Heatseekers Albums chart and sold 4,000 copies first week.

== Track listing ==
Standard edition
No.	Title	Writer(s)	Producer(s)	Length
1.	"Heartbeat"	Kevin Bard	S*A*M and Sluggo	2:45
2.	"A Little More Us"	Kevin Bard, Sam Hollander, Dave Katz, Adam Schlesinger	S*A*M and Sluggo	3:08
3.	"Tongue Tied"	Kevin Bard, Blake Healy	Blake Healy	2:37
4.	"Me & You"	Kevin Bard	S*A*M and Sluggo	2:59
5.	"Chemistry"	Kevin Bard	Blake Healy	1:59
6.	"Over It"	Kevin Bard	Blake Healy	2:26
7.	"Downtown"	Kevin Bard	Blake Healy	2:21
8.	"Back to the Future"	Kevin Bard	Blake Healy	2:05

iTunes bonus track edition
No.	Title	Length
9.	"Build Me Up Buttercup"	2:43

Japanese bonus track edition
No.	Title	Length
9.	"Heartbeat" (acoustic)	2:01
10.	"A Little More Us" (acoustic)	3:09
11.	"Closer"	2:14
12.	"Tongue Tied" (Cash Cash remix)	4:03

== Credits ==
Credits for Stuck on Repeat adapted from AllMusic.

Stereo Skyline

- Kevin Bard – guitar, vocals, producer
- Clayton Johnson – guitar
- Brian Maddox – bass
- Rob Michelsen – drums

Production

- Matt Craig – engineering
- Carson Donnelly – A&R
- Doug Fenske – engineering
- Meghan Foley – art direction
- Eshy Gazit – engineering
- Serban Ghenea – mixing
- Blake Healy – producer, additional production
- Jon Kaplan – mixing
- Dave Katz – composer
- Andrew Keller – A&R
- Scott Mann – producer, engineering
- Andy Marcinkowski – mixing assistant
- Vlado Meller – mastering
- Chad Royce – producer, engineering
- S*A*M and Sluggo – producer
- Adam Schlesinger – composer
- Eric Stenman – engineer
- Jayme Thornton – photography

== Charts ==
Chart performance for Stuck on Repeat
Chart (2010)	Peak position
US Billboard 200	133
US Heatseekers Albums (Billboard)	4

== Release history ==
Release formats for Stuck on Repeat
Region	Date	Format(s)	Edition	Label	Ref.
United States	July 20, 2010	CD	Standard	Columbia	
Various	July 27, 2010	Digital download	iTunes bonus track	Columbia	
Japan	July 30, 2010	CD	Standard	Columbia	
Japan	December 8, 2010	CD	Japanese bonus track	Sony	
