= The Compton Effect =

Studio album by Greydon Square
- Released: June 5, 2007
- Recorded: 2006 – 2007
- Genre: Hip hop
- Label: Baby Blue House
- Producer: Greydon Square

Greydon Square chronology
Absolute (2004)	The Compton Effect (2007)	The C.P.T. Theorem (2008)

The Compton Effect is the second album from rapper Greydon Square. It is his first album using the title Greydon Square, as his first album, Absolute (now no longer available), was recorded under the name 'Apocalypse'. The title is a reference to the Compton effect in physics (Greydon's undergraduate field of study), as well as the city of Compton, California, from which the artist originates.

== Track listing ==
All songs were written by Greydon Square, except where noted.

1. "An Irrational Argument" – 0:29
2. "A Rational Response" – 3:54
3. "The Compton Effect" – 3:49
4. "Molotov" – 2:46
5. "Extian" – 3:57
6. "Buddy" – 4:16
7. "Psych Eval" – 1:39
8. "Pandora's Box" – 3:09
9. "Roots" – 4:16
10. "Ears" – 3:43
11. "Stranger" (featuring Traumah) – 3:29
12. "Squared" – 4:16
13. "Say" – 4:00
14. "Addressed" – 2:31
15. "The Dream" – 4:42
16. "Gone" – 4:30
17. "Dear Journal" – 3:07
18. "What Up" – 3:19
19. "As a Fan" – 2:15
