= Sunshine State of Mind =

Studio album by We the Kings
- Released: July 5, 2011
- Recorded: 2010–2011 in New York City
- Genre: Pop rock; pop
- Length: 33:38
- Label: S-Curve, Virgin
- Producer: S*A*M & Sluggo

We the Kings chronology
Smile Kid (2009)	Sunshine State of Mind (2011)	Party, Fun, Love, and Radio EP (2012)

Singles from Sunshine State of Mind
- 1. "Friday Is Forever" Released: April 12, 2011; 2. "Say You Like Me" Released: July 1, 2011

Sunshine State of Mind is the third studio album by American rock band We the Kings, released on July 5, 2011.

== Background ==
While writing new material, We the Kings used piano and acoustic guitars. Travis Clark explained that he "wanted all the songs to be able to be stripped down with acoustic and vocals, and [the band] built it off that."

== Release ==
Sunshine State of Mind was released through S-Curve Records on July 5, 2011 on iTunes and July 12 everywhere else. "Say You Like Me" was released to mainstream radio on September 13, 2011. In February and March 2012 the band went on a co-headlining tour with Mayday Parade, with support from The Downtown Fiction and Anarbor.

== Reception ==
Professional ratings
Review scores
Source	Rating
AbsolutePunk	46%
AllMusic	3/5 stars
Alternative Press	2.5/5 stars
Sputnikmusic	2/5 stars

The album received mixed to negative reviews from music journalists. It debuted at No. 45 on the US Billboard 200 and at No. 9 on the Rock Albums chart. This is the last album to feature bass player Drew Thomsen.

== Track listing ==
All lyrics are written by Travis Clark, except where noted; all music is composed by Travis Clark, Sam Hollander and Dave Katz, except where noted.

No.	Title	Length
1.	"Friday Is Forever" (lyrics: Clark, Robert Schwartzman / music: Clark, Hollander, Katz, Schwartzman)	3:05
2.	"Say You Like Me"	3:29
3.	"Every Single Dollar" (music: Clark)	2:53
4.	"The View from Here"	4:05
5.	"The Secret to New York"	3:02
6.	"Sleep with Me"	3:41
7.	"Over You"	3:27
8.	"Kiss Me Last"	2:56
9.	"Somebody to Call My Own"	3:52
10.	"You and Only You"	3:08

iTunes/Australian CD bonus track
No.	Title	Length
11.	"Summer"	2:43

== Personnel ==
We the Kings

- Travis Clark – lead vocals, rhythm guitar
- Hunter Thomsen – lead guitar, backing vocals
- Danny Duncan – drums
- Drew Thomsen – bass

== Charts ==
Chart performance
Chart (2011)	Peak position
Australian Albums (ARIA)	95
US Billboard 200	45
US Top Alternative Albums (Billboard)	5
US Top Rock Albums (Billboard)	9
