= We'll Be a Dream =

Single by We the Kings featuring Demi Lovato

from the album Smile Kid
- Released: March 2, 2010
- Recorded: 2009
- Genre: Pop rock
- Length: 3:53 (album version); 3:30 (radio edit)
- Label: S-Curve
- Songwriter: Travis Clark

We the Kings singles chronology
"Heaven Can Wait" (2009)	"We'll Be a Dream" (2010)	"She Takes Me High" (2010)

Demi Lovato singles chronology
"Remember December" (2010)	"We'll Be a Dream" (2010)	"Wouldn't Change a Thing" (2010)

Music video
- "We'll Be a Dream" on YouTube

"We'll Be a Dream" is a song by American rock band We the Kings featuring American singer Demi Lovato, released as the second single from their second studio album, Smile Kid.

The song debuted at number 95 on the Billboard Hot 100, making the band's second entry on this chart. It has since peaked at number 76. As of October 2017, the song has sold 314,000 copies.

== Music video ==
The music video premiered on MTV on April 22, 2010 and was directed by Raul B. Fernandez. The video begins, as various teens prepare and as they head off to what appears to be a camp. At the camp, the band starts playing. During Lovato's verse, she walks through the teens as they throw pillows at each other. Later, the teens throw such things as a bucket of chocolate, Silly String, water balloons and toilet paper at each other. In the end, the teens are covered with their stuff. The video ends, as Lovato and Travis Clark, lead singer of the band, look at each other.

== Awards and nominations ==
The song has been nominated in the 2010 Teen Choice Awards, as Teen Choice Hook-Up between the band and Lovato.

== In other media ==
The song was featured in the episode "Blood Brothers" of The Vampire Diaries.

== Charts ==
Chart (2010)	Peak position
US Billboard Hot 100	76
US Mainstream Top 40 (Billboard)	23

== Sales ==
Region	Certification	Certified units/sales
United States	—	314,000

== Release history ==
Region	Date	Format
United States	March 2, 2010	Digital download
