= Stereo Skyline =

American pop rock band

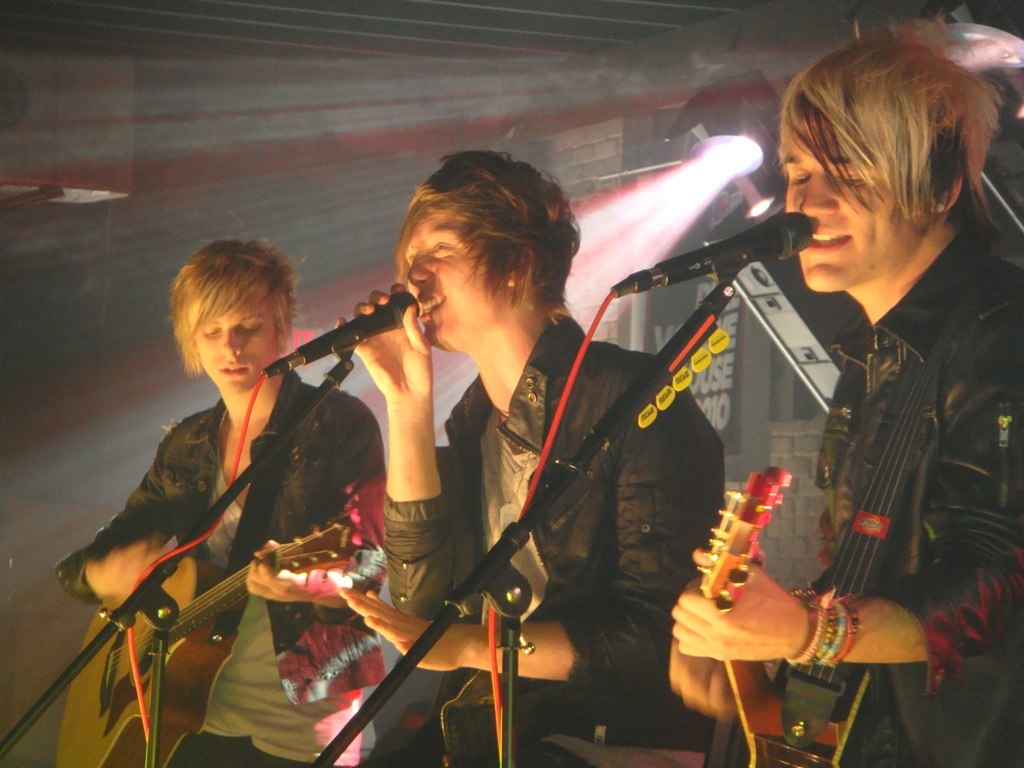
- Stereo Skyline performing at SXSW 2010

Background information
- Origin: East Meadow, New York, United States
- Genres: Pop rock; neon pop punk; pop punk; power pop; emo pop; post-hardcore (early)
- Years active: 2006–2012; 2019
- Label: Columbia Records
- Past members: Kevin Bard; Tom Angenbroich; Eddie Dizura; Clayton Johnson; Brian Maddox; Dane Milanovic; Jay Marotta; Rob Michelsen; Anthony Purpura; Matt Villani

Stereo Skyline was an American pop rock band from East Meadow, New York, which was formed in 2006. The band's most successful line-up consisted of guitarist and lead vocalist Kevin Bard, drummer Rob Michelsen, bassist Brian Maddox and lead guitarist Clayton Johnson.

The group signed with Columbia Records in 2009, and has played at The Bamboozle 2007, The Bamboozle Left 2009, The Bamboozle 2009, The 2010 Take Action Tour, The Bamboozle Roadshow 2010. Their discography consists of two EPs and two albums, Stuck On Repeat and The Good Life, the first peaked at number 133 on the Billboard 200.

== History ==
=== 2006–07: Formation and The Worst Case Scenario EP ===
The band formed in 2006, while members of the group were still attending high school in East Meadow, New York. The group was co-founded by Matt Villani and he recruited Jay Marotta and Anthony Purpura to play guitar and bass guitar, respectively. Dane Drozdzewicz and Eddie Dizura joined the band to round out the line-up to play drums and guitar, respectively.

Soon after the formation of the first line-up, the band would see numerous line-up changes. Tom Angenbroich was recruited to play bass guitar and scream, Kevin Bard was recruited to play guitar and sing vocals, and Purpura moved to drums, after Drozdzewicz and Dizura left. According to Bard, Stereo Skyline was named after their home state of New York and their love for music.

They released their first EP, The Worst Case Scenario in 2006. The EP was recorded by the producer Nick Zinnanti in his Bethpage, New York, studio. While studying at Hofstra University in Hempstead, New York, Rob Michelsen joined Stereo Skyline as the drummer through a mutual friend who told Michaelsen that Bard was looking for a drummer. The band toured around Long Island in 2006 and 2007 to promote its release.

=== 2007–08:Stereo Skyline EP and departure of Villani ===
The band signed with Ozone Management in 2007. In winter and spring 2008, the band recorded an EP called Stereo Skyline at Stadiumred in Harlem, New York. It was released on July 16, 2008. Despite its lack of chart success, the EP managed to sell 12,000 copies in the US and 150,000 downloads. The artwork for the EP was created by Alexander Sheldon of Match & Kerosene and was edited into its final state by Russell Heiman of Nice Guys Finish First.

In September 2008, Villani left the group. He was replaced by Brian Maddox who joined the group in New York after his band Scenes and Sirens broke up. In November 2008, Marotta left the band for undisclosed reasons. In January 2009, the band signed a publishing deal with Sony/ATV Music Publishing. In February 2009, the band was taken on by the Paradigm Booking Agency. In June 2009, the band had signed a record deal with Columbia Records. They made an acoustic performance at Denny's that same month. The group performed at the 2009 Bamboozle Festival and supported Hey Monday's US tour in the summer. The group toured with Mitchel Musso in September 2009.

=== 2010: Stuck on Repeat ===
The band was featured in Alternative Press magazine as one of its "100 Bands You Need to Know" for 2010.

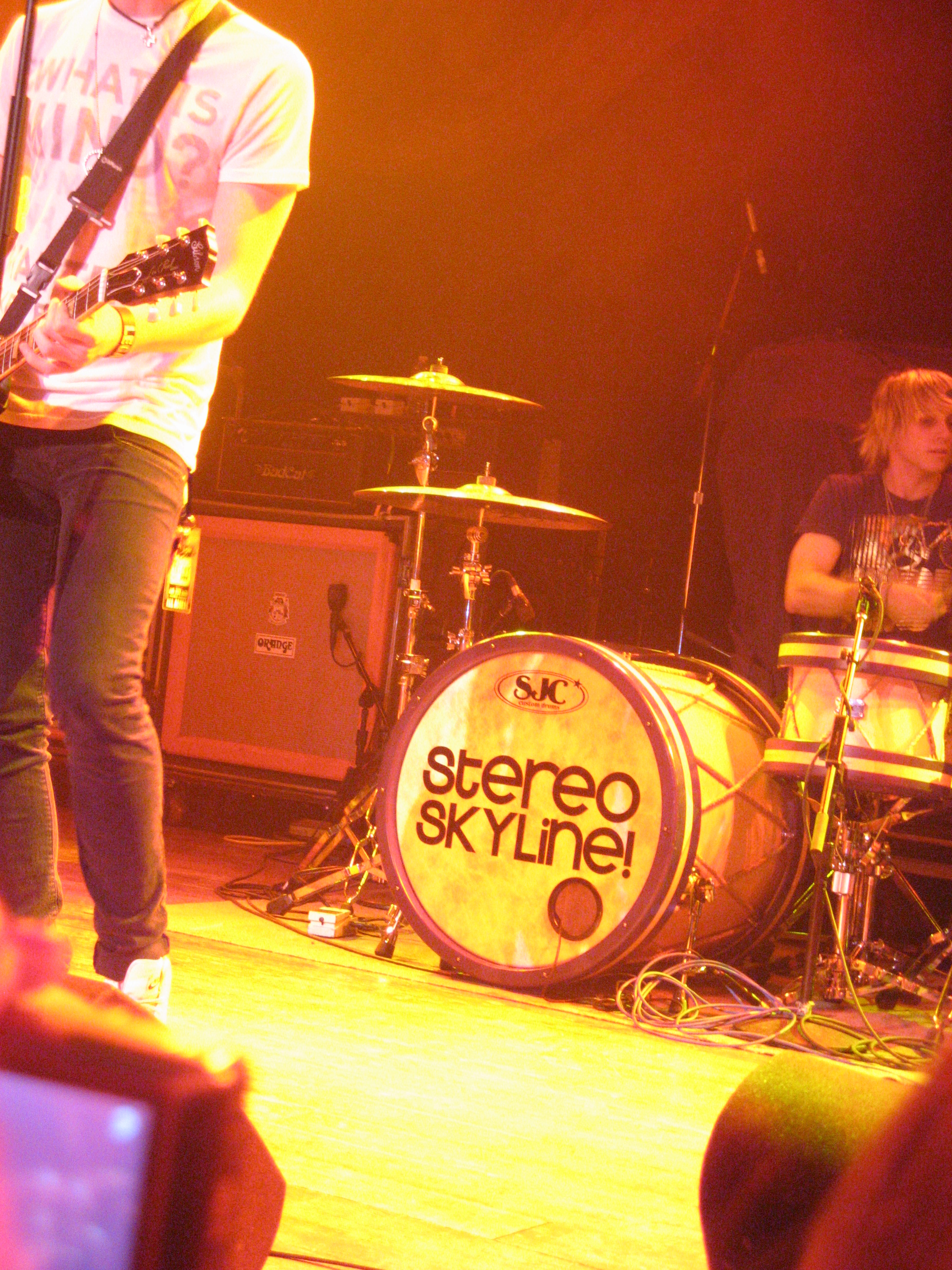
Michelsen in 2009.

On April 26, 2010, after being the touring guitarist since January 2010, Clayton Johnson officially joined Stereo Skyline as its permanent guitarist and backing vocalist. The band appeared on the MTV show Silent Library with Hey Monday. They also performed at the Bamboozle Road Show 2010 in May.

The band's album, Stuck on Repeat, was released on July 20, 2010. It was produced by Blake Healy (formerly of Metro Station) and includes production and songwriting work by S*A*M and Sluggo and Adam Schlesinger. The album's lead single, "Tongue Tied" was released on June 15, 2010. The group released the second single from the album, "Me & You" on November 30, 2010. The band went on their first headlining tour called the Stuck on Repeat tour to promote the album with The Audition, Cash Cash, The Downtown Fiction and Cady Groves for support in the summer of 2010. The group also headlined the Shop Til You Rock tour.

On November 1, 2010, the band made their debut televised performance on Good Day New York. The group toured for the remainder of 2010 with The Summer Set, Mod Sun and Austin Gibbs.

=== 2011–12: Departure of Maddox and Johnson and The Good Life ===
In spring 2011, Stereo Skyline set out on Tourantula! supporting Family Force 5. Their song "Uptown, Get Around" was played at the beginning of The Suite Life Movie.

On May 21, 2011, Johnson and Maddox announced that they had left Stereo Skyline to form a new group called BLAC. Bard announced that he and Michelsen would continue to tour and would release new Stereo Skyline songs, along with continuing with their planned Brazil tour. On August 11, 2011, the band released the single "Kiss Me in the Morning" from their upcoming second studio album The Good Life. Michelsen left the band before the release of their second album and the Brazil tour. The Good Life was released on November 1, 2011. Physical copies of the album were released exclusively in Japan on November 9, through Twilight Records. Bard brought back Purpura and friends Larzz Principato and Ryan Forsythe to fill out the touring line-up. They appeared in Brazil on MTV Brasil while on tour there. In 2012, the band performed a show in December, with Michelsen returning to the group.

After disappearing from the music scene for several years, Stereo Skyline returned in 2019 and released the single "Runaway's" with Hamptons. To date, Bard composes music for several different artists such as The Summer Set and Dan + Shay, as well as forming a musical project called Max & Simon in 2011. Johnson formed a band with his brothers called the Johnsons in 2017. Maddox became a DJ and made music under the name BMAD.

== Members ==
=== Former members ===
- Kevin Bard – lead vocals, guitar (2006–2011)
- Rob Michelsen – drums (2006–2011, 2012)
- Matt Villani – vocals, piano, synthesizer, guitar (2006–2008)
- Tom Angenbroich – bass, unclean vocals (2006–2007)
- Jay Marotta – guitar, bass (2006–2008)
- Anthony Purpura – synthesizer, drums, bass (2006–2007, 2011)
- Eddie Dizura – guitar (2006)
- Dane Milanovic – drums (2006)
- Brian Maddox – bass (2008–2011)
- Clayton Johnson – guitar, backing vocals (2010–2011)

=== Former touring members ===
- Ryan Forsythe – bass (2011)
- Cal Knapp – guitar (2009)
- Larzz Principato – guitar (2011)

== Discography ==
=== Studio albums ===
List of studio albums, with selected chart positions and sales figures
Title	Album details	Peak chart positions		Sales
Title	Album details	US	US Heat.	Sales
Stuck on Repeat	Released: July 20, 2010; Label: Columbia Records; Format: CD, digital download	133	4	US: 4,000
The Good Life	Released: November 1, 2011; Label: Stereo Skyline, Twilight (Japan only); Format: CD, digital download	—	—	
"—" denotes releases that did not chart.

=== Extended plays ===
List of extended plays, with selected details and sales figures
Title	EP details	Sales
The Worst Case Scenario	Released: September 24, 2006; Label: Independent; Format: CD	
Stereo Skyline	Released: July 16, 2008; Label: Independent; Format: CD, digital download	US: 12,000

=== Singles ===
Title	Year	Album
"Heartbeat"	2008	Stereo Skyline
"Tongue Tied"	2010	Stuck on Repeat
"Me and You"	2010	Stuck on Repeat
"Kiss Me In the Morning"	2011	The Good Life
"That Everything"	2011	The Good Life
"Runaway's"	2019	Non-album single
