= Check Yes Juliet =

2008 single by We the Kings

"Check Yes Juliet (Run Baby Run)"

Single by We the Kings

from the album We the Kings
- Released: February 4, 2008
- Recorded: 2007
- Studio: Mission Sound (Brooklyn, NY); Fresh Kills Music (New York, NY)
- Genre: Pop punk; pop rock; power pop; emo
- Length: 3:39
- Label: S-Curve
- Songwriters: Travis Clark; Sam Hollander; Dave Katz
- Producer: S*A*M and Sluggo

We the Kings singles chronology
"Skyway Avenue" (2007)	"Check Yes Juliet (Run Baby Run)" (2008)	"Secret Valentine" (2008)

"Check Yes Juliet" (subtitled "Check Yes Juliet (Run Baby Run)" on some single releases) is a song by American rock band We the Kings. It was released in February 2008 as the second single from their eponymous debut album (2007). The band also produced a music video for the song. The track is currently their biggest hit on Billboard charts, peaking at No. 70 on the Billboard Hot 100.

In 2011, it gained "sleeper hit" status in Australia, where it peaked at No. 26 on the ARIA charts, being certified triple platinum by the Australian Recording Industry Association for the shipment of 210,000 copies. It was also certified triple platinum in the US. The song is featured in the 2009 rhythm-based video game Lego Rock Band.

== Music video ==
The video was directed by Alan Ferguson. It portrays lead singer Travis Clark as Romeo "tossing rocks" at Juliet's window. Juliet's parents do not approve of Juliet's relationship with Clark, and, therefore, ordered Juliet to stay away from him. The video ends with Juliet sneaking out to see Clark perform at a house party and ultimately leaving with him. Juliet is played by Addison Timlin.

== Track listing ==
Promo CD single

1. "Check Yes Juliet" – 3:39

== Charts ==
Chart (2008–2011)	Peak position
Australia (ARIA)	26^{1}
Canada CHR/Top 40 (Billboard)	49
US Billboard Hot 100	70
US Pop Airplay (Billboard)	25

^{1} "Check Yes Juliet" charted in Australia in 2011, and was released as their first official single in the region for their Australian tour.

== Certifications ==
Certifications for "Check Yes Juliet"
Region	Certification	Certified units/sales
Australia (ARIA)	3× Platinum	210,000^{‡}
New Zealand (RMNZ)	Gold	15,000^{‡}
United Kingdom (BPI)	Silver	200,000^{‡}
United States (RIAA)	3× Platinum	3,000,000^{‡}
^{‡} Sales+streaming figures based on certification alone.

== Release history ==
Release dates and formats for "Check Yes Juliet"
Region	Date	Format	Label(s)	Ref.
United States	April 15, 2008	Mainstream airplay	S-Curve	
