= The Maine discography =

- The Maine logo
- Studio albums: 10
- Extended plays: 11
- Live albums: 2
- Compilation albums: 2
- Singles: 34
- Music videos: 37

The Maine is an American rock band, formed in Tempe, Arizona in 2007. The band has released ten studio albums, eleven extended plays, 34 singles and 37 music videos. Their debut studio album, Can't Stop Won't Stop was released on July 8, 2008, via Fearless Records, peaking at No. 40 on the Billboard 200. Their second studio album, Black & White was released on July 13, 2010, through Warner Records, peaking No. 19 on the Billboard 200. Their third studio album, Pioneer was released on December 6, 2011, and peaked at No. 90 on the Billboard 200. Forever Halloween, their fourth studio album, was released on June 4, 2013, and peaked at No. 39 on Billboard 200. Their fifth studio album American Candy was released on March 31, 2015, and peaked at No. 37 on the Billboard 200. Their sixth studio album Lovely Little Lonely, peaked at No. 32 on the Billboard 200 and was released on April 7, 2017. You Are OK was released as the band's seventh studio album on March 29, 2019, and peaked at No. 52 on the Billboard 200. The group released their eighth studio album, XOXO: From Love and Anxiety in Real Time on July 12, 2021, and their ninth studio album, The Maine on August 1, 2023. The band's tenth studio album, Joy Next Door, was released on April 10, 2026.

As of December 2010, the band has sold 156,000 albums and 768,000 digital singles.

== Albums ==
=== Studio albums ===
List of studio albums, with selected chart positions and sales figures
Title	Album details	Peak chart positions									Sales
Title	Album details	US	US Rock	US Alt.	US Indie	CAN	FIN	SCO	UK	UK Indie	Sales
Can't Stop Won't Stop	Released: July 8, 2008; Label: Fearless (FRL 30112); Format: CD, DL, LP	40	14	11	4	—	—	—	—	—	US: 100,000 (Note: Sales of Can't Stop Won't Stop in the United States as of March 2019.)
Black & White	Released: July 12, 2010; Label: Warner Bros. (523012); Format: CD, DL	16	6	4	—	48	—	—	—	—	US: 22,634 (Note: First week sales of Black & White in the United States.)
Pioneer	Released: December 2, 2011; Label: Action Theory (529760); Format: CD, DL, LP	90	14	11	6	—	—	—	—	—	US: 12,000 (Note: First week sales of Pioneer in the United States.)
Forever Halloween	Released: June 4, 2013; Label: 8123 (8123-003); Format: CD, DL, LP	39	16	13	8	—	6	—	—	— (Note: Forever Halloween did not enter the UK Independent Albums Chart, but peaked at number 15 on the UK Independent Album Breakers Chart.)	US: 26,000 (Note: Sales of Forever Halloween in the United States as of March 2015.)
American Candy	Released: March 31, 2015; Label: 8123 (8123-012); Format: CD, DL, LP	37	9	7	3	—	—	92	159	28	US: 15,000 (Note: First week sales of American Candy in the United States.)
Lovely Little Lonely	Released: April 7, 2017; Label: 8123 (8123-023); Format: CD, CS, DL, LP	32	4	3	6	—	—	99	— (Note: Lovely Little Lonely did not enter the UK Albums Chart, but peaked at number 58 on the UK Album Downloads chart.)	24	
You Are OK	Released: March 29, 2019; Label: 8123; Format: CD, CS, DL, LP	52	5	4	1	—	—	—	— (Note: You Are OK did not enter the UK Albums Chart, but peaked at number 74 on the UK Album Downloads chart.)	—	
XOXO: From Love and Anxiety in Real Time	Released: July 12, 2021; Label: 8123, Photo Finish; Format: CD, DL, LP	— (Note: XOXO: From Love and Anxiety in Real Time did not enter the Billboard 200, but peaked at number 7 on the Billboard Top Current Albums chart.)	38	22	32	—	—	—	— (Note: XOXO: From Love and Anxiety in Real Time did not enter the UK Albums Chart, but peaked at number 42 on the UK Album Downloads chart.)	—	
The Maine	Released: August 1, 2023; Label: 8123, Photo Finish; Format: CD, DL	—	—	—	—	—	—	—	—	—	
Joy Next Door	Released: April 10, 2026; Label: 8123, Photo Finish	— (Note: Joy Next Door did not enter the Billboard 200, but peaked at number 32 on the Billboard Top Album Sales chart.)	—	—	— (Note: Joy Next Door did not enter the US Independent Albums chart, but peaked at number 4 on the Billboard Indie Store Album Sales chart.)	—	—	—	—	—	
"—" denotes a recording that did not chart or was not released in that territory.

=== Compilation albums ===
List of compilation albums, with selected chart positions
Title	Album details	Peak chart positions	
Title	Album details	US	US Indie
Less Noise: A Collection of Songs by a Band Called The Maine	Released: June 22, 2018; Label: 8123; Format: DL	— (Note: Less Noise: A Collection of Songs by a Band Called The Maine did not enter the Billboard 200, but peaked at number 95 on the Billboard Top Current Albums chart.)	27
Dyed (2008-2023)	Released: January 15, 2025; Label: 8123; Format: DL	—	—
"—" denotes a recording that did not chart or was not released in that territory.

=== Live albums ===
List of live albums
Title	Album details
Never Shout Never & The Maine	Released: December 21, 2010; Label: Warner Bros.; Format: DL
Live at the Orpheum Theatre	Released: August 9, 2019; Label: 8123; Format: DL

== Extended plays ==
List of extended plays, with selected chart positions and sales figure
Title	EP details	Peak chart positions				Sales
Title	EP details	US	US Rock	US Alt.	US Indie	Sales
Stay Up, Get Down	Released: May 8, 2007; Label: Self-released; Format: CD, DL, 7" vinyl	—	—	—	—	
The Way We Talk	Released: December 11, 2007; Label: Fearless (FRL 30105); Format: CD, DL	—	—	—	45	US: 50,000 (Note: Sales of The Way We Talk in the United States as of 2008.)
...And a Happy New Year	Released: December 8, 2008; Label: Fearless; Formats: CD, DL	195	—	—	18	
This Is Real Life EP	Released: December 7, 2009; Label: Fearless; Formats: DL	—	—	—	—	
Daytrotter Session	Released: September 7, 2010; Label: Daytrotter (DTP13); Format: DL, LP	—	—	—	—	
In Darkness & in Light	Released: December 27, 2010; Label: Warner Bros.; Format: DL	93	19	14	—	
Good Love – The Pioneer B-Sides	Released: September 11, 2012; Label: Fearless; Format: DL	—	—	—	—	
Imaginary Numbers	Released: December 10, 2013; Label: 8123 (8123-004); Format: CD, DL, 10" vinyl	— (Note: Imaginary Numbers did not enter the Billboard 200, but peaked at number 151 on the Billboard Top Current Albums chart.)	—	—	31	
Rdio Sessions	Released: July 15, 2014; Label: 8123; Format: DL	—	—	—	—	
Covers	Released: June 24, 2016; Label: 8123 (8123-020); Format: CD, DL	—	—	—	—	
... And to All a Good Night	Released: December 15, 2017; Label: 8123; Format: DL	—	—	—	—	
"—" denotes a recording that did not chart or was not released in that territory.

== Singles ==
=== Lead singles ===
List of singles, with selected chart positions
Title	Year	Peak chart positions			Album
Title	Year	US Alt.	US Rock	CAN Rock	Album
"The Way We Talk"	2007	—	—	—	The Way We Talk
"Into Your Arms"	2009	—	—	—	Can't Stop Won't Stop
"Inside of You"	2010	—	— (Note: "Inside of You" did not enter the Billboard Rock & Alternative Airplay chart, but peaked at number 14 on the US Rock Digital Song Sales chart.)	—	Black & White
"Growing Up"	2010	—	— (Note: "Growing Up" did not enter the Billboard Rock & Alternative Airplay chart, but peaked at number 36 on the US Rock Digital Song Sales chart.)	—	Black & White
"Some Days"	2011	—	—	—	Pioneer
"Don't Give Up on "Us""	2011	—	—	—	Pioneer
"You'll Never Know"	2012	—	—	—	Pioneer and the Good Love
"Happy"	2013	—	—	—	Forever Halloween
"Ugly on the Inside"	2014	—	—	—	Forever Halloween
"English Girls"	2015	—	—	—	American Candy
"Miles Away"	2015	—	—	—	American Candy
"Love Yourself"	2016	—	—	—	Covers
"Bad Behavior"	2017	—	—	—	Lovely Little Lonely
"Black Butterflies and Déjà Vu"	2017	—	—	—	Lovely Little Lonely
"I Only Wanna Talk to You"	2017	—	—	—	Lovely Little Lonely
"How Do You Feel?"	2017	—	—	—	Lovely Little Lonely
"Numb Without You"	2019	—	—	—	You Are OK
"My Best Habit"	2019	—	—	—	You Are OK
"Broken Parts"	2019	—	—	—	You Are OK
"Sticky"	2021	16	32	—	XOXO: From Love and Anxiety in Real Time
"April 7th"	2021	—	—	—	XOXO: From Love and Anxiety in Real Time
"Lips"	2021	—	—	—	XOXO: From Love and Anxiety in Real Time
"Pretender"	2021	—	—	—	XOXO: From Love and Anxiety in Real Time
"Loved You a Little" (featuring Taking Back Sunday & Charlotte Sands)	2022	8	14	46	Non-album singles
"Box in a Heart" (featuring Renforshort)	2022	—	—	—	Non-album singles
"Blame"	2023	25	—	—	The Maine
"How to Exit a Room"	2023	—	—	—	The Maine
"Dose No. 2"	2023	—	—	—	The Maine
"Thoughts I Have While Lying in Bed" (Original or featuring with Beach Weather)	2023	23	—	—	The Maine
"Leave in Five" (Original or featuring with MisterWives)	2023	—	—	—	The Maine
"Touch"	2024	—	—	—	Non-album single
"Die to Fall"	2026	—	—	—	Joy Next Door
"Quiet Part Loud"	2026	—	—	—	Joy Next Door
"Palms"	2026	—	—	—	Joy Next Door
"—" denotes a recording that did not chart or was not released in that territory.

=== As featured artist ===
List of singles as featured artist
Title	Year	Album
"Go on Then, Love" (Said the Sky featuring The Maine)	2021	Non-album single
"Same" (Katastro featuring The Maine)	2024	Until the End of Time

=== Promotional singles ===
List of promotional singles, with selected chart positions
Title	Year	Peak chart positions		Album
Title	Year	US Bub.	US Rock Dig.	Album
"Everything I Ask For"	2008	19	—	Can't Stop Won't Stop
"Girls Do What They Want"	2008	—	—	Can't Stop Won't Stop
"Ho Ho Hopefully"	2008	—	—	...And a Happy New Year
"Right Girl"	2010	—	25	Black & White
"Misery"	2011	—	—	Pioneer
"Take Me Dancing"	2012	—	—	Pioneer and the Good Love
"Like We Did (When We Were Lost)"	2012	—	—	Non-album single
"Love and Drugs"	2013	—	—	Forever Halloween
"So Criminal"	2014	—	—	Forever Halloween
"Same Suit, Different Tie"	2015	—	—	American Candy
"You Get What You Give" (featuring Brennan Smiley)	2015	—	—	Covers
"Do You Remember? (The Other Half of 23)"	2017	—	—	Lovely Little Lonely
"Watermelon Sugar"	2020	—	—	Non-album singles
"Thnks fr th Mmrs"	2021	—	—	Non-album singles
"High Forever"	2021	—	—	XOXO: From Love and Anxiety in Real Time
"—" denotes releases that did not chart

== Music videos ==
List of music videos, showing year released and director
Title	Year	Director(s)	Ref.
"Everything I Ask For"	2008	Matthew Stawski	
"Girls Do What They Want"	2009	Dan Fussellman	
"Into Your Arms"	2009	Aaron Platt	
"Inside of You"	2010	Mike Jones and Jim Sullos	
"Right Girl"	2010	Loren Brinton	
"Listen to Your Heart"	2011	Jay Obyrne	
"Misery"	2012	Daniel Gomes	
"Like We Did (Windows Down)"	2012	Dirk Mai	
"These Four Words"	2013	Daniel Gomes	
"Love & Drugs"	2013	Daniel Gomes	
"Run"	2014	Daniel Gomes	
"English Girls"	2015	Daniel Gomes	
"Steal My Sunshine"	2015	Braverijah Gregg	
"Am I Pretty?"	2016	Unknown	
"Another Night on Mars"	2016	Unknown	
"Bad Behavior"	2017	Unknown	
"Taxi"	2017	Tucker Audie	
"How Do You Feel?"	2017	Tucker Audie	
"Winter Means Nothing (Without You)"	2017	Unknown	
"Sticky"	2021	Angela Kohler	
"April 7th"	2021	Guadalupe Bustos	
"Lips"	2021	Unknown	
"Loved You a Little"	2022	Guadalupe Bustos	
"Box in a Heart"	2022	Guadalupe Bustos	
"Blame"	2023	Guadalupe Bustos	
"How to Exit a Room"	2023	Reelbros & The Maine	
"Dose No. 2"	2023	Nick Stafford, Austin Gavin, and The Maine	
"Thoughts I Have While Lying in Bed"	2023	Nick Stafford	
"Leave in Five"	2024	Unknown	
"Touch"	2024	Beewax	
"Die to Fall"	2026	Guadalupe Bustos	
"Quiet Part Loud"	2026	Guadalupe Bustos	
"Palms"	2026	Guadalupe Bustos	
"Green"	2026	Guadalupe Bustos	
"Half a Spark"	2026	Guadalupe Bustos	
"Parking Garage Song #5"	2026	Guadalupe Bustos	
"3:31"	2026	Guadalupe Bustos	

== Other appearances ==
Year	Title	Album	Ref.
2008	"I Wanna Love You"	Punk Goes Crunk	
2009	"Pour Some Sugar on Me"	Punk Goes Classic Rock	
2012	"Girls Just Want to Have Fun" (featuring Adam Lazzara)	Punk Goes Pop Volume 5	
2018	"Transatlanticism"	Songs That Saved My Life	
2023	"Neon Lights (Rock Version)" (Demi Lovato featuring The Maine)	Revamped	
