= Lovely Little Lonely =

Studio album by The Maine
- Released: April 7, 2017
- Recorded: Fall 2016, Gualala, California
- Studios: Brooklyn Patch; New York City, New York
- Genres: Pop rock; alternative rock; emo
- Length: 34:19
- Label: 8123
- Producer: Colby Wedgeworth

The Maine chronology
American Candy (2015)	Lovely Little Lonely (2017)	You Are OK (2019)

Singles from Lovely Little Lonely
- 1. "Bad Behavior" Released: January 19, 2017; 2. "Black Butterflies and Déjà Vu" Released: March 2, 2017; 3. "I Only Wanna Talk to You" Released: August 4, 2017; 4. "How Do You Feel?" Released: August 11, 2017

Lovely Little Lonely is the sixth studio album by American rock band The Maine and was released on April 7, 2017, through the band's label 8123. It debuted at number 32 on the Billboard 200. It also reached number 4 on the US Top Rock Albums chart and at number 3 on the US Independent Albums chart. The album was supported by four singles, "Bad Behavior", "Black Butterflies and Déjà Vu", "I Only Wanna Talk to You" and "How Do You Feel?".

The band embarked on two headlining tours in support of the album, the Lovely Little Lonely Tour from March to May 2017, and the Modern Nostalgia Tour in October and November. The album was met with praise from music critics, describing it as their "most cohesive record."

== Recording ==
Recording for their sixth album initially took place in New York in the fall of 2016. The band had wanted to record in the city for a while and Pat suggested taking a week to fly out and find a space to work in. They set out with producer Colby Wedgeworth and recorded at the Brooklyn Patch - a house with a built-in studio made specifically for bands to record/write in. Satisfied with their New York experience but searching for more inspiration, the guys ended up at an Airbnb in Gualala, California. The home was transformed into a recording space in the mountains, overlooking the ocean. The recording process was documented by the band and made into a mini YouTube series which they titled "Miserable Youth".

According to lead guitarist Jared Monaco, they spent "more time mapping everything out" and by the time they entered the studio, they were more prepared for recording the album. The album is centered around feelings of nostalgia, happiness and sadness, as explained by drummer Pat Kirch, who highlighted the tracks "Taxi", "Do You Remember? (The Other Half of 23)", "Lost in Nostalgia" and "The Sound of Reverie", as examples. Despite having a "clear vision" for what the album would sound like, the writing and recording process was challenging for the band, as they put pressure on themselves and were selective of the songs to put on the album that would fit its "vibe."

Reflecting on the album, Kirch said the group had a "feeling of confidence" after recording "Bad Behavior" and described that feeling of recording the album with Wedgeworth, "couldn't happen again with the next record." Bassist Garrett Nickelsen stated the album was "similar or complementary" to their previous album, American Candy (2015) and that Wedgeworth was given "more leadership." Nickelsen also revealed that the most difficult part of recording the album was how their gear "kept breaking" and the band only had one working amp, which he said "had a frustrating aspect, too." On the contrary, Monaco said "turning a vacation house into a professional studio space" was the hardest part.

== Release ==
After a series of teasers on their social media accounts, The Maine announced their upcoming album on January 15, 2017. Four days later, "Bad Behavior" was made available for streaming. On January 20, the group headlined 8123 Fest. A music video was released for "Bad Behavior" on February 23. The song peaked at number 44 on Billboard's Spotify Viral 50 chart. On March 2, "Black Butterflies and Déjà Vu" was made available for streaming. On March 26, the group released a clip of "How Do You Feel?". On March 29, "Do You Remember? (The Other Half of 23)" was made available for streaming. Preceded by a one-off show in the UK, the group embarked on a North American tour in March and April. The tour, dubbed as the Lovely Little Lonely Tour, was supported by Beach Weather and The Mowgli's. The band organized small pop-up shops throughout select cities of the tour to sell merchandise and give fans a chance to connect with them while on the road.

Lovely Little Lonely was released on April 7. "Just hearing the people sing songs off the record before this and our most recent record way louder than any of the older songs is kind of insane. It just feels good to go out there and have people respond this way, to what we're doing", says the band about the release of new material and touring. On May 26, the group released an acoustic version of "Bad Behavior". Following two shows in Asia in June, the group went on a tour of Brazil in July. In July and August, the group supported Dashboard Confessional on their headlining US tour. On August 4, the group released an acoustic version of their third single from the album, "I Only Wanna Talk to You". Their fourth single "How Do You Feel?" was released on August 11, 2017. On August 17, a music video was released for "Taxi". On September 22, the band premiered the music video for "How Do You Feel?", which the concept of the video was inspired by the Beatles' appearance on The Ed Sullivan Show and The Animals video of "The House of the Rising Sun", according to O'Callaghan. In October and November, the group embarked on The Modern Nostalgia Tour where they performed Lovely Little Lonely and American Candy in their entirety. They were supported by Dreamers and Night Riots.

In January 2018, the band announced a North American tour in April to May. Later, the group announced two shows in the UK for June 2018. In March, remixes for "Lost in Nostalgia" and "The Sound of Reverie" were released, respectively, the former was remixed by O'Callaghan. From June to August, the band participated at the Warped Tour and also signified the end of their Lovely Little Lonely era. On August 6, the music video for "Lonely" was released.

== Reception ==
Professional ratings
Review scores
Source	Rating
Alternative Press	4.5/5 stars
idobi Radio	(Favourable)
The Music	5/5 stars

The album was met with overall praise from fans and music critics alike. Jesse Richman of Alternative Press writes "The result is an album that feels timeless, even on first impact. It's the Maine's best batch of songs since Pioneer, their catchiest material since Can't Stop, Won't Stop and their most cohesive work to date". Amber Ainsworth of ClickonDetroit says "The guitars are more prominent and defining, while there's a line between it being entirely a rock album and being something that doesn't fit neatly into one genre". The Music remarked, "Lovely, Little, Lonely is the most cohesive record The Maine have ever written. The core reason that this record gets a perfect score from me is that this record just feels so goddamned alive." Emillie Marvel of idobi Radio wrote, "When you have high expectations, it's easy to be let down, unless those expectations are placed on The Maine [...] Yet again, they've moved forward into a whole new world of music that makes you feel something without giving the past a second thought." Becky Kovach of Chorus.fm wrote that the album "challenges listeners to re-evaluate the way they approach new music. It draws you in from start to finish with indie pop sensibilities, while remaining true to the band's rock roots. The journey the band takes – realizing that they're not as young as they once were and making the conscious effort to understand what that means – is one that everyone must take at some point in their lives. For many of The Maine's fans this album may be the catalyst that starts it."

== Track listing ==
No.	Title	Length
1.	"Don't Come Down"	3:13
2.	"Bad Behavior"	3:10
3.	"Lovely"	0:34
4.	"Black Butterflies and Déjà Vu"	3:23
5.	"Taxi"	3:04
6.	"Do You Remember? (The Other Half of 23)"	3:02
7.	"Little"	1:13
8.	"The Sound of Reverie"	3:30
9.	"Lost in Nostalgia"	1:40
10.	"I Only Wanna Talk to You"	4:33
11.	"Lonely"	2:32
12.	"How Do You Feel?"	4:22
Total length:		34:19

== Personnel ==
- John O'Callaghan – vocals, guitar, piano
- Jared Monaco – lead guitar
- Kennedy Brock – rhythm guitar
- Garret Nickelsen – bass guitar
- Pat Kirch – drums
- Colby Wedgeworth – producer, mixing

== Charts ==
Chart performance for Lovely Little Lonely
Chart (2017)	Peak position
Scottish Albums (Official Charts)	99
UK Album Downloads (Official Charts)	58
UK Independent Albums (OCC)	24
US Billboard 200	32
US Independent Albums (Billboard)	6
US Top Alternative Albums (Billboard)	3
US Top Rock Albums (Billboard)	4
