= The Way We Talk =

The Way We Talk may refer to:

- "The Way We Talk", a track on 1990 album East of the Sun, West of the Moon by A-ha
- The Way We Talk (EP), a 2007 EP of the American rock band The Maine
- The Way We Talk (film), a 2024 Hong Kong film
