= You Are OK =

Studio album by The Maine
- Released: March 29, 2019
- Recorded: 2018
- Genre: Alternative rock
- Length: 44:27
- Label: 8123
- Producer: Matt Squire

The Maine chronology
Lovely Little Lonely (2017)	You Are OK (2019)	XOXO: From Love and Anxiety in Real Time (2021)

Singles from You Are OK
- 1. "Numb Without You" Released: January 16, 2019; 2. "My Best Habit" Released: February 22, 2019; 3. "Broken Parts" Released: March 22, 2019

You Are OK is the seventh full-length album by American rock band The Maine, released on March 29, 2019. "Numb Without You" was released as the lead single and "My Best Habit" and "Broken Parts" were the last two singles released from the album.

== Background and recording ==
The band worked with producer Matt Squire for their seventh album You Are OK. Squire previously worked with the band on their first album, Can't Stop Won't Stop in 2008. The album was influenced by Tears for Fears.

In December 2018, lead singer John O'Callaghan confirmed that the album had been completed. It was also revealed that guitarist Jared Monaco had almost quit the group prior to the release of You Are OK.

O'Callaghan revealed the meaning behind the name You Are OK via an Instagram post saying, "I decided to name this album those three small words for no better reason than to speak to myself." He continues by stating, "Selfish as it may be, I need to hear those words often, and if they somehow resonate like they did with this someone across the world then I accidentally did at least a little good while I was alive. Moral is, words are more powerful than ever, use them with the utmost care."

In support of the album, the group toured across Europe, the US and Brazil from April to June 2019. They also performed at the 2019 Sad Summer Fest. The band embarked on the Mirror Tour in the fall of 2019 with support from Twin XL. You Are OK won the Rock Sound award for Album of the Year in 2019.

== Release ==
The album was officially released on March 29, 2019. Upon the album's release, it spawned three singles. The lead single, "Numb Without You" was released on January 16, 2019. "My Best Habit" was released as the second single from the album on February 22. Just a week before the album's release, the third and final single, "Broken Parts" was released on March 22.

== Reception ==
Professional ratings
Review scores
Source	Rating
idobi	10/10
Sputnikmusic	1.5/5
Upset	4/5 stars

You Are OK was met with positive reviews from music critics. Timothy Monger of AllMusic described the album's sound as an, "increasingly slick contemporary pop territory with big melodic choruses, loads of hooks, and a more varied palette of sounds." Sam Devotta of idobi praised the band for consistently mixing up their sound and rewarded the album a 10 out of 10 rating. Jack Press of Upset stated that the album is, "by far the most confident album The Maine have made, stacking risk after risk up on a pedestal from EDM-wrapped orchestral strings ('Numb Without You') to nine-minute alt-prog jams ('Flowers On The Grave').

A negative review came from Sputnikmusic remarking, "You Are OK's main problem: The Maine are at their most ambitious, I guess, but in the wrong ways. Production flourishes and a new song structure hamper their strengths here [...] The Maine best go back and start caring about the right things and who they are as a band."

== Track listing ==
You Are OK track listing
No.	Title	Length
1.	"Slip the Noose"	4:03
2.	"My Best Habit"	3:54
3.	"Numb Without You"	3:32
4.	"I Feel It All Over"	4:00
5.	"Heaven, We're Already Here"	4:39
6.	"Forevermore"	2:51
7.	"Tears Won't Cry (Shinjū)"	4:12
8.	"One Sunset"	3:33
9.	"Broken Parts"	4:20
10.	"Flowers on the Grave"	9:23
Total length:		44:27

== Personnel ==
Members

- John O'Callaghan – lead vocals, piano
- Jared Monaco – lead guitar
- Kennedy Brock – rhythm guitar, vocals
- Garrett Nickelsen – bass guitar
- Patrick Kirch – drums, percussion

== Charts ==
Chart performance for You Are OK
Chart (2019)	Peak position
UK Album Downloads (OCC)	74
US Billboard 200	52
US Independent Albums (Billboard)	1
US Top Alternative Albums (Billboard)	4
US Top Rock Albums (Billboard)	5
