= American Candy =

Studio album by The Maine
- Released: March 31, 2015
- Recorded: November–December 2014, Joshua Tree, California
- Genre: Alternative rock; indie rock; new wave; pop rock
- Length: 35:05
- Label: 8123
- Producer: Colby Wedgeworth

The Maine chronology
Imaginary Numbers (2013)	American Candy (2015)	Lovely Little Lonely (2017)

Singles from American Candy
- 1. "English Girls" Released: February 10, 2015; 2. "Miles Away" Released: March 10, 2015

American Candy is the fifth studio album by American rock band The Maine, released on March 31, 2015, through 8123 Records. The album debuted at number 37 on the Billboard 200. The album sold 15,000 copies in its first week.

== Background and composition ==
The Maine were teasing a new album in summer 2014, and then proceeded to announce that they would be writing new material in Heber, Arizona. Recording took place at Joshua Tree in California with Colby Wedgeworth acting as the producer. He also engineered and mixed the sessions. Recording place between November 12 and December 12. Ross Garfield was the drum technician at Drum Doctors. Tom Coyne mastered the recordings at Sterling Sound.

The album's sound has been described as alternative rock, indie rock, new wave, pop, pop rock and rock. "American Candy" was originally written for Forever Halloween. Drummer Pat Kirch explained that the song "didn't really fit" Forever Halloween, but the band revived it for American Candy "and made it fit."

== Release ==
On January 6, 2015, the group revealed that their new album was titled American Candy, and would be released in the spring. "English Girls" was made available for streaming on February 9, and was released as a single on February 10. The song garnered more than 92,000 streams in less than 4 days on Soundcloud. On the same day, American Candy was announced for release, and the track listing and artwork was revealed. "Miles Away" was made available for streaming on March 10. The song debuted at number 16 on the iTunes Alternative Chart. "Same Suit, Different Tie" was made available for streaming on March 30. American Candy was released through 8123 Records on March 31. To help promote the release, the band released an acoustic version of "Miles Away" and did a 24-hour live stream. In April and May, the group went on a headlining North American tour with support from Real Friends, Knuckle Puck and the Technicolors. On June 1, a music video for "English Girls" was premiered via MTV which was directed by Daniel Gomes. Tyler Sharp of Alternative Press said the video features the band members "enduring an interesting night out, which is concluded with an unforeseen twist."

From late August to early October, the band went on The Free For All Tour; every show of the tour was free-of-charge. The shows took place at out-of-the-ordinary areas such as radio stations, parks and malls. Kirch explained the band wanted the tour to be "a big party and an opportunity" for fans "who can't afford to buy a ticket to come". In between the dates for the tour, the band performed intimate shows where they played American Candy in full. Kirch revealed the band "felt like it was important to do and our fans wanted to hear it". The band supported Mayday Parade in the UK and Europe in January and February 2016. In March and April, the band went on a co-headlining US tour with Mayday Parade with support from Better Off. On March 28, a music video was released for "Am I Pretty?". The band went on the 2016 edition of Warped Tour.

== Critical reception ==
Professional ratings
Review scores
Source	Rating
AbsolutePunk	7/10
AllMusic	3.5/5 stars
Alternative Addiction	4/5 stars
Alternative Press	4/5 stars
AXS	Favorable
Idobi	10/10
The Peak	Favorable
Rock Sound	5/10
The State Press	Favorable
UWM Post	Favorable

American Candy received mostly positive feedback from music critics. Mark Deming of AllMusic rated the album three and a half stars out of five, writing that it is "a polished contemporary pop sound that meshes with the band's strong but tuneful approach, and the lyrics are often thoughtful and frequently witty meditations on relationships, popular culture, and the world around us." Annie Zaleski of Alternative Press gave the album four out of five stars and writes: "American Candy is full of the classic-sounding pop-rock they do so well."

American Candy was nominated for Album Of The Year at the 2016 Alternative Press Music Awards.

== Track listing ==
All tracks are written by The Maine.

No.	Title	Length
1.	"Miles Away"	3:38
2.	"Same Suit, Different Tie"	3:18
3.	"My Hair"	3:15
4.	"English Girls"	3:13
5.	"24 Floors"	3:43
6.	"Diet Soda Society"	3:00
7.	"Am I Pretty?"	3:02
8.	"(Un)Lost"	3:45
9.	"American Candy"	3:48
10.	"Another Night on Mars"	4:26
Total length:		35:05

== Personnel ==
Personnel per booklet.

The Maine

- John O'Callaghan – vocals, guitar, keys
- Jared Monaco – lead guitar
- Kennedy Brock – rhythm guitar
- Garrett Nickelsen – bass
- Pat Kirch – drums

Production

- Colby Wedgeworth – producer, engineer, mixing
- Tom Coyne – mastering
- Ross Garfield – drum tech
- John O'Callaghan, Tim Kirch – art direction, design
- Dirk Mai – photography

== Charts ==
Chart performance for American Candy
Chart (2015)	Peak position
Scottish Albums (OCC)	92
UK Albums (OCC)	159
UK Indie Albums (OCC)	28
US Billboard 200	37
US Digital Albums (Billboard)	25
US Independent Albums (Billboard)	3
US Top Alternative Albums (Billboard)	7
US Top Album Sales (Billboard)	27
US Top Rock Albums (Billboard)	9

== Release history ==
Region	Date	Format(s)	Label
United States	March 31, 2015	CD; DL; LP	8123
