= My Heroine =

"My Heroine" may refer to:

- "My Heroine", a 2011 song by The Maine from Pioneer
- "My Heroine" (Silverstein song), 2005
