= The 8123 Tour =

2013 concert tour by the Maine

- Tour by The Maine
- Location: North America; Asia; Europe
- Associated album: Forever Halloween
- Start date: June 4, 2013
- End date: July 27, 2013
- No. of shows: 38

The Maine concert chronology
- The Maine Presents: The Pioneer World Tour (2012); The 8123 Tour (2013)

The 8123 Tour was the fourth headlining concert tour by the American rock band,The Maine, in support of their fourth studio album Forever Halloween (2013). Not to be confused with 8123 Fest, the tour in 2013-14 consisted of 37 shows in North America. The tour kicked off at a free hometown show at Tempe Marketplace in Tempe, Arizona.

The tour was independently put on by the band's management team, 81 Twenty Three. The original tour line-up consisted of headliner The Maine, their management-mates This Century, and fellow music business friends in A Rocket to the Moon and Brighten and visits 38 dates over 37 North American cities.

Fans were invited to check in regularly on the official Eighty One Twenty Three website where each of the four bands updated the blog with behind-the-scenes content. Fans were given access to the first official 8123 pop-up shop and exclusive materials including a download at the end of the tour of live recordings from the shows. Content such as tour video updates can be viewed here, here, and here.

The tour came back to Manila, Philippines as the first leg of the tour which happened in SM North EDSA Skydome on January 12, 2014.

On May 14, 2014, 8123 announced the tour would play a leg in the UK in October 2014.

== Opening acts ==
- A Rocket to the Moon
- This Century
- Brighten

== Setlists ==
From the June 22, 2013 Chicago, Illinois show at Bottom Lounge

The Maine

1. Love & Drugs
2. Misery
3. Inside of You
4. We All Roll Along
5. Into Your Arms
6. Right Girl
7. Happy
8. Some Days
9. Kennedy Curse
10. My Heroine
11. These Four Words
12. Whoever She Is
13. Identify
14. Girls Just Want to Have Fun (Cyndi Lauper cover)
15. Count 'Em One, Two, Three
16. Like We Did (Windows Down)
17. We'll All Be...

A Rocket to the Moon

1. Call It All Home
2. If Only They Knew
3. Wild & Free
4. Whole Lotta You
5. Baby Blue Eyes
6. If I'm Gonna Fall In Love
7. Dakota
8. Give a Damn
9. Annabelle
10. Like We Used To
11. Mr. Right

This Century

1. Hopeful Romantic
2. Tip Toe
3. Skeletons
4. To Love and Back
5. Everywhere Everything
6. Bleach Blonde
7. Slow Dance Night
8. Sound of Fire

Brighten

1. I’ll Be There
2. Never Alone
3. We Are Birds
4. Little Locket

== Tour dates ==
Date	City	Country	Venue
June 4, 2013	Tempe	United States	Tempe Marketplace
June 7, 2013	Anaheim	United States	House of Blue
June 8. 2013	San Francisco	United States	Great American Music Hall
June 9, 2013	Sacramento	United States	Ace of Spades
June 11, 2013	Seattle	United States	El Corazon
June 12, 2013	Vancouver	Canada	The Rio Theater
June 14, 2013	Calgary	Canada	The Den
June 15, 2013	Edmonton	Canada	Avenue Theatre
June 18, 2013	Winnipeg	Canada	The Garrick
June 20, 2013	Minneapolis	United States	Varsity Theater
June 21, 2013	Chicago	United States	Bottom Lounge
June 22, 2013	Chicago	United States	Bottom Lounge
June 23, 2013	Des Moines	United States	Wooly's
June 25, 2013	Detroit	United States	Crofoot Ballroom
June 26, 2013	Toronto	Canada	Phoenix Theater
June 27, 2013	Montreal	Canada	La Tulipe
June 28, 2013	Portland	United States	Port City Music Hall
June 29, 2013	Boston	United States	The Paradise
June 30, 2013	Wilton	United States	Trackside
July 2, 2013	New York City	United States	Irving Plaza
July 3, 2013	Philadelphia	United States	Theatre of Living Arts
July 5, 2013	Asbury Park	United States	Stone Pony
July 6, 2013	Washington, D.C.	United States	9:30 Club
July 7, 2013	Pittsburgh	United States	Altar Bar
July 9, 2013	Cleveland	United States	Peabody's
July 10, 2013	Columbus	United States	Newport Music Hall
July 11, 2013	Nashville	United States	3rd & Lindsley
July 12, 2013	Birmingham	United States	Workplay
July 13, 2013	Atlanta	United States	The Loft
July 14, 2013	Jacksonville	United States	Freebird
July 16, 2013	Orlando	United States	Beacham Theater
July 18, 2013	New Orleans	United States	House of Blues
July 19, 2013	Houston	United States	Warehouse
July 20, 2013	Austin	United States	The Parish
July 21, 2013	Dallas	United States	Trees
July 24, 2013	Denver	United States	The Summit
July 26, 2013	Tucson	United States	The Rock
July 27, 2013	Phoenix	United States	The Crescent Ballroom
January 12, 2014	Manila	Philippines	SM North EDSA Skydome
October 1, 2014	Brighton	United Kingdom	Haunt
October 3, 2014	Glasgow	United Kingdom	The Garage
October 6, 2014	Manchester	United Kingdom	Manchester Academy 3
