= XOXO: From Love and Anxiety in Real Time =

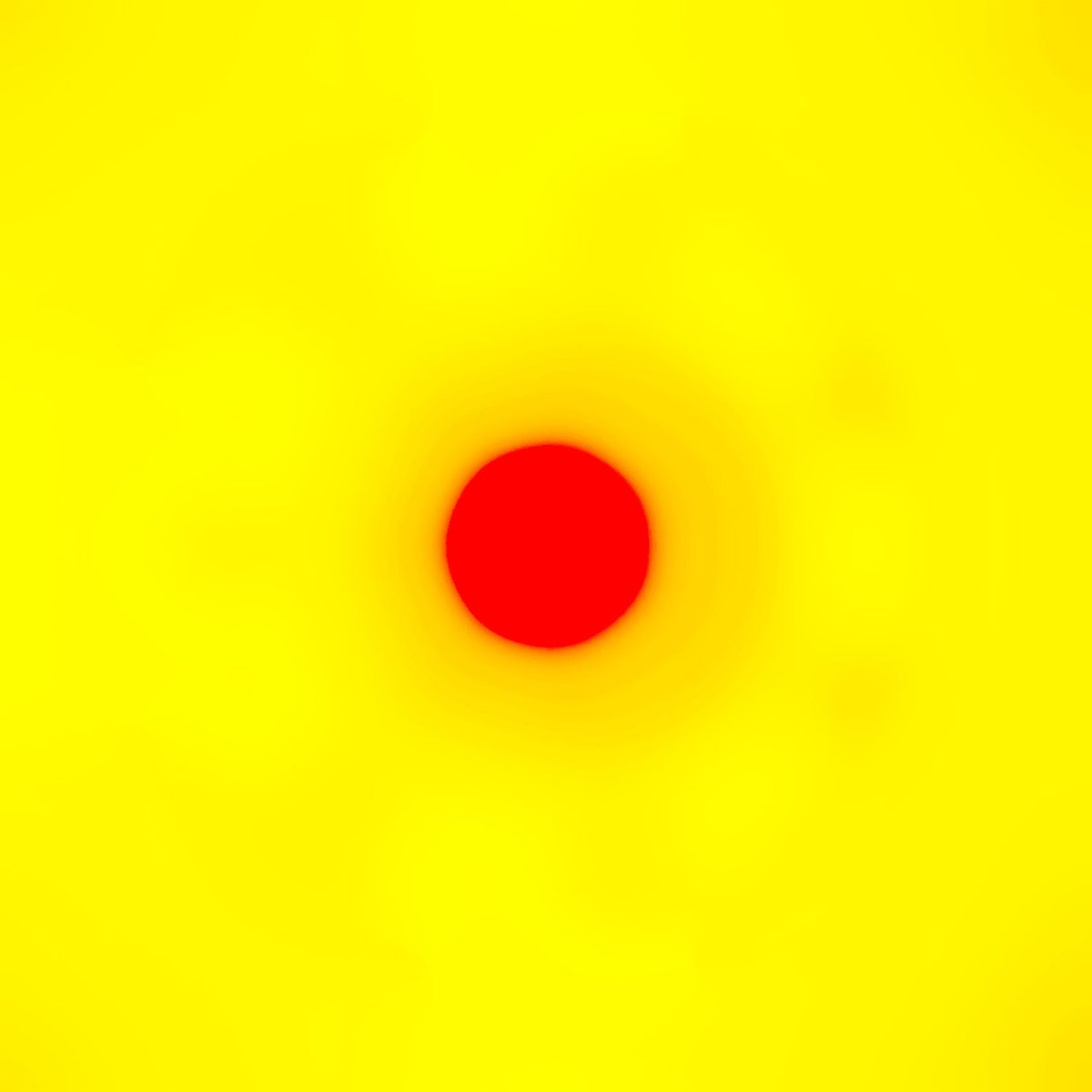

Studio album by The Maine
- Released: July 9, 2021
- Recorded: 2020
- Studio: 8123 Studios
- Genres: Indie pop; pop rock
- Length: 32:25
- Labels: 8123; Photo Finish
- Producers: John O'Callaghan; The Maine; Matt Keller; Andrew Goldstein; Colby Wedgeworth

The Maine chronology
You Are OK (2019)	XOXO: From Love and Anxiety in Real Time (2021)	The Maine (2023)

Singles from XOXO: From Love and Anxiety in Real Time
- 1. "Sticky" Released: March 19, 2021; 2. "April 7th" Released: April 7, 2021; 3. "Lips" Released: May 28, 2021; 4. "Pretender" Released: June 25, 2021

XOXO: From Love and Anxiety in Real Time is the eighth studio album by American rock band The Maine and was released on July 9, 2021, through 8123 and Photo Finish Records. The indie rock and pop rock album, produced by John O'Callaghan, Matt Keller, Andrew Goldstein and Colby Wedgeworth, was met with positive reviews from music critics, praising the group's evolving sound and production. The album peaked at number eleven on the Billboard Top Album Sales and number 22 on the Top Alternative Albums chart.

The album's lead single "Sticky" was released on March 19, 2021, and peaked at number 16 on the US Alternative Airplay chart. It was then preceded by another three singles: "April 7th", "Lips" and "Pretender".

The band embarked on the XOXO Tour in the United States, in support of the album.

== Background ==
In June 2020, lead vocalist John O'Callaghan confirmed that the group began recording their eighth studio album and that ten tracks had already been written for the album. The album was recorded in Arizona. Guitarist Jared Monaco described the album as "a love letter to uncertain moments in life, and also to happy, joyous moments as well." The group had thought of the title of the album early on during the recording session, which the band would usually have done before hand. O'Callaghan said that the title of the album captured the mood swings of the record.

== Composition and recording ==
The album was produced by the band, Andrew Goldstein, Matt Keller and Colby Wedgeworth. While recording the record during the 2020 COVID-19 pandemic, the band lived in a house together and recorded the album for a week. The album's lead single, "Sticky", was the last song written for the album, but was the first song recorded on the album. The album's sound is described as indie pop and pop rock, while experimenting with heavier synths and electronic elements. While recording the instrumental parts of the songs, the group recorded what O'Callaghan and bassist Garrett Nickelsen called, "'bonehead version' of the guitar parts, and bass parts." Describing the recording of these parts, Nickelsen stated, "we're all working on it as a group, and figuring out what's the best version of this and what does every part need to be? So, it's a group thing." During the writing of "Lips", another track, "Love In Real Time" was originally written to be a part of that song, which O'Callaghan called, "an extension" of the track. However, O'Callaghan decided that the song would've been more impactful on its own.

== Release ==
On March 15, 2021, the band announced the album along with news that the lead single, "Sticky", would be released on March 19, 2021. The song peaked at number 16 on the US Alternative Airplay chart, and became one of the group's highest-charting singles. On April 7, the band released the album's second single, "April 7th". "Lips" was released on May 28, as the third single from the album. The fourth and final single, "Pretender" was released on June 25. To celebrate the album's release, the band set up The XOXO Experience, a theater showcase which set the album's tracks to visuals in Tempe and premiered the song "High Forever" on Alt Nation on July 7. On July 10, the group orchestrated an XOXO pop-up shop in Los Angeles, and held a livestream event known as Face Towards the Sun on July 11, also in Los Angeles. To support the album, the band went on tour that fall in support of All Time Low. The group also embarked on a headlining tour in the US called the XOXO Tour in March 2022.

== Critical reception ==
Professional ratings
Review scores
Source	Rating
Alternative Press	Favorable
idobi	10/10
Sputnikmusic	3/5

The album received positive critical reception with Augusta Battoclette of Alternative Press stating that "...the group only further prove that they hardly ever miss when it comes to their music." idobi's Sam Devotta claimed that the band had "once again delivered an album that perfectly sums up what it means to be human." Her review regards the album as a "product of huge changes in their personal lives (weddings, babies, moving out of state)" as well as a record that allowed them "to explore, to bring in new inspirations and try something different, while still delivering the pop rock-infused anthems they're known for." Jesper of Sputnikmusic praised the album's "clean production." He also stated, "While XOXO is a successful reminder that The Maine are still able to create some of the best pop punk in the current scene, it also showcases that they're struggling to assemble consistently excellent albums."

== Commercial performance ==
XOXO: From Love and Anxiety in Real Time peaked at number eleven on the US Billboard Top Album Sales chart. It also reached number seven on the US Top Current Album Sales chart. On the US Top Alternative Albums chart, it reached a peak of number 22. Internationally, the album peaked at number 42 on the UK Album Downloads Chart.

== Track listing ==
All tracks are written by Garrett Nickelsen, Jared Monaco, John O'Callaghan, Kennedy Brock, and Pat Kirch except where noted.

No.	Title	Writer(s)	Length
1.	"Sticky"	Nickelsen; Monaco; O'Callaghan; Brock; Kirch; Andrew Goldstein	2:58
2.	"Lips"		2:38
3.	"Love In Real Time"		1:50
4.	"High Forever"	Nickelsen; Monaco; O'Callaghan; Brock; Kirch; Goldstein	3:00
5.	"April 7th"	Nickelsen; Monaco; O'Callaghan; Brock; Kirch; Colby Wedgeworth	3:16
6.	"If Your Light Goes Out"	Nickelsen; Monaco; O'Callaghan; Brock; Kirch; Wedgeworth	2:57
7.	"Pretender"		3:05
8.	"Dirty, Pretty, Beautiful"	Nickelsen; Monaco; O'Callaghan; Brock; Kirch; Wedgeworth	3:52
9.	"Anxiety In Real Time"	Nickelsen; Monaco; O'Callaghan; Brock; Kirch; Wedgeworth	4:12
10.	"Face Towards The Sun"		4:34
Total length:			32:25

== Personnel ==
Per the XOXO: From Love and Anxiety in Real Time liner notes.

The Maine

- John O'Callaghan – vocals, guitar, piano
- Jared Monaco – lead guitar
- Kennedy Brock – rhythm guitar
- Garret Nickelsen – bass guitar, synths
- Pat Kirch – drums

Production

- John O'Callaghan & The Maine – Producer
- Matt Keller – Additional production and engineering
- Andrew Goldstein – Additional production on "Sticky"
- Colby Wedgeworth – Additional production on "April 7th" and "If Your Light Goes Out"
- Neal Avron – Mix engineer on tracks 1, 2, 4, and 6
- Dan Lancaster – Mix engineer on tracks 3, 5, 7, 8, 9, and 10

Artwork

- Rich Raun – Album art design and creative director
- Guadalupe Bustos – Photography
- Dirk Mai – Photography

== Charts ==
Chart performance for XOXO: From Love and Anxiety in Real Time
Chart (2021)	Peak position
UK Album Downloads (Official Charts)	42
US Top Album Sales (Billboard)	11
US Top Alternative Albums (Billboard)	22
US Independent Albums (Billboard)	32
US Top Rock Albums (Billboard)	38
