= The Maine (band) =

American rock band

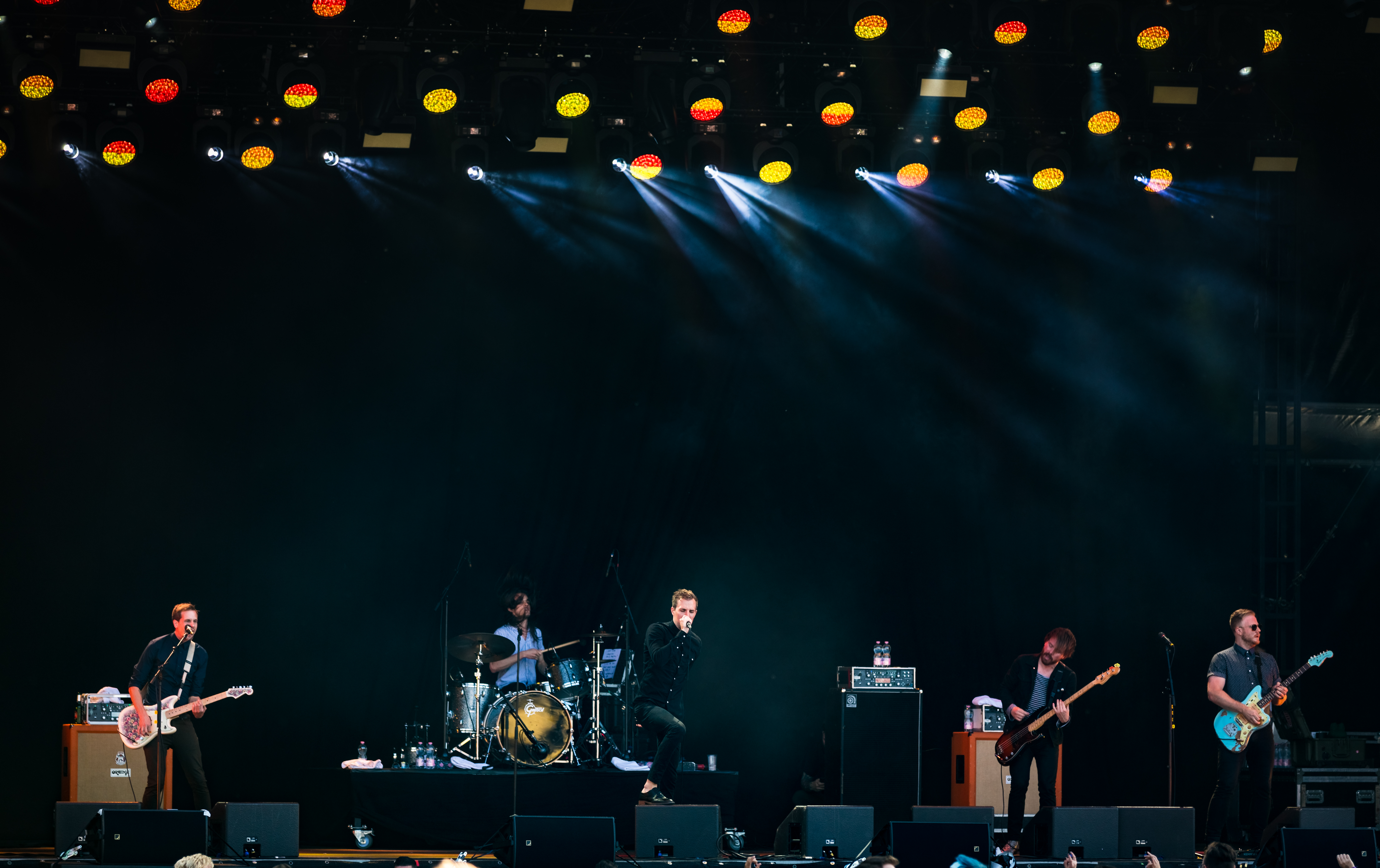
- The Maine performing in 2018

Background information
- Origin: Tempe, Arizona, U.S.
- Genres: Alternative rock; pop punk; pop rock; emo pop; emo
- Works: The Maine discography
- Years active: 2007–present
- Labels: Fearless; Warner Bros.; Action Theory; Rude; Sire; Universal; 8123; Photo Finish
- Members: John O'Callaghan; Kennedy Brock; Jared Monaco; Garrett Nickelsen; Pat Kirch
- Past members: Alex Ross; Ryan Osterman
- Website: themaineband.com

The Maine is an American rock band from Tempe, Arizona. Formed in 2007, the group consists of lead vocalist, guitarist and pianist John O'Callaghan, lead guitarist Jared Monaco, bass guitarist Garrett Nickelsen, drummer Patrick Kirch, and rhythm guitarist Kennedy Brock.

Their first release, the Stay Up, Get Down extended play, was released in 2007, followed by the five-song EP, The Way We Talk, on December 11, 2007. The band's first full-length studio album, Can't Stop Won't Stop, was released July 8, 2008, while their second full-length album, Black & White, was released on July 13, 2010. Since then, the band has independently released eight albums including Pioneer (2011), Forever Halloween (2013), American Candy (2015), Lovely Little Lonely (2017), You Are OK (2019), XOXO: From Love and Anxiety in Real Time (2021), The Maine (2023), and Joy Next Door (2026).

== History ==
=== Early years (2006–2007) ===
Bassist Garrett Nickelsen and drummer Patrick Kirch had been playing in a hardcore band called the Kerosene Kids. When the lead singer of the group left, they opted to start over with a new name and sound. In January 2007, when they were still in high school, Nickelsen and Kirch regrouped as The Maine. The name came from the song "Coast of Maine" by Ivory. Singer John O'Callaghan joined soon after auditions - with no prior vocal experience - along with guitarists Alex Ross and Ryan Osterman. Together, they released their debut EP Stay Up, Get Down on May 8, 2007. Months later, Osterman and Ross left the band and were replaced by Kennedy Brock and Jared Monaco. In November 2007, The Maine signed to Fearless Records. They released their debut single "The Way We Talk" on December 10, 2007. On the following day, they released their second EP, The Way We Talk which was produced by Matt Grabe. The EP peaked at number ten on the US Billboard Heatseekers Albums chart and sold 50,000 copies. The EP also peaked at number 45 on the US Independent Albums chart.

=== Can't Stop Won't Stop (2008–2009) ===
Pre-production for their debut album was held at The Swing House in Hollywood, California. The group recorded the album at The Lair in Los Angeles, California where it was produced by Matt Squire. According to O'Callaghan, the group went for a "poppier direction than the EP," when describing their sound on their debut studio album. The group premiered a new track, "Everything I Ask For" on their MySpace page on June 3, 2008. The song was later released digitally on June 10. The song peaked at number 19 on the US Billboard Bubbling Under Hot 100 chart. Their debut full-length studio album, Can't Stop Won't Stop was released on July 8, 2008. The album debuted at number 40 on the Billboard 200 and sold 12,000 copies first week. The band toured with Good Charlotte, Boys Like Girls and Metro Station on the Soundtrack of Your Summer tour during the summer of 2008. In the fall of 2008, The Maine joined All Time Low on the Compromising of Integrity, Morality & Principles in Exchange for Money tour along with Mayday Parade and Every Avenue. The music video for "Everything I Ask For" premiered on MTV on November 19, 2008, and was directed by Matthew Stawski. Alternative Press named the group one of the "100 Bands You Need to Know in 2008."

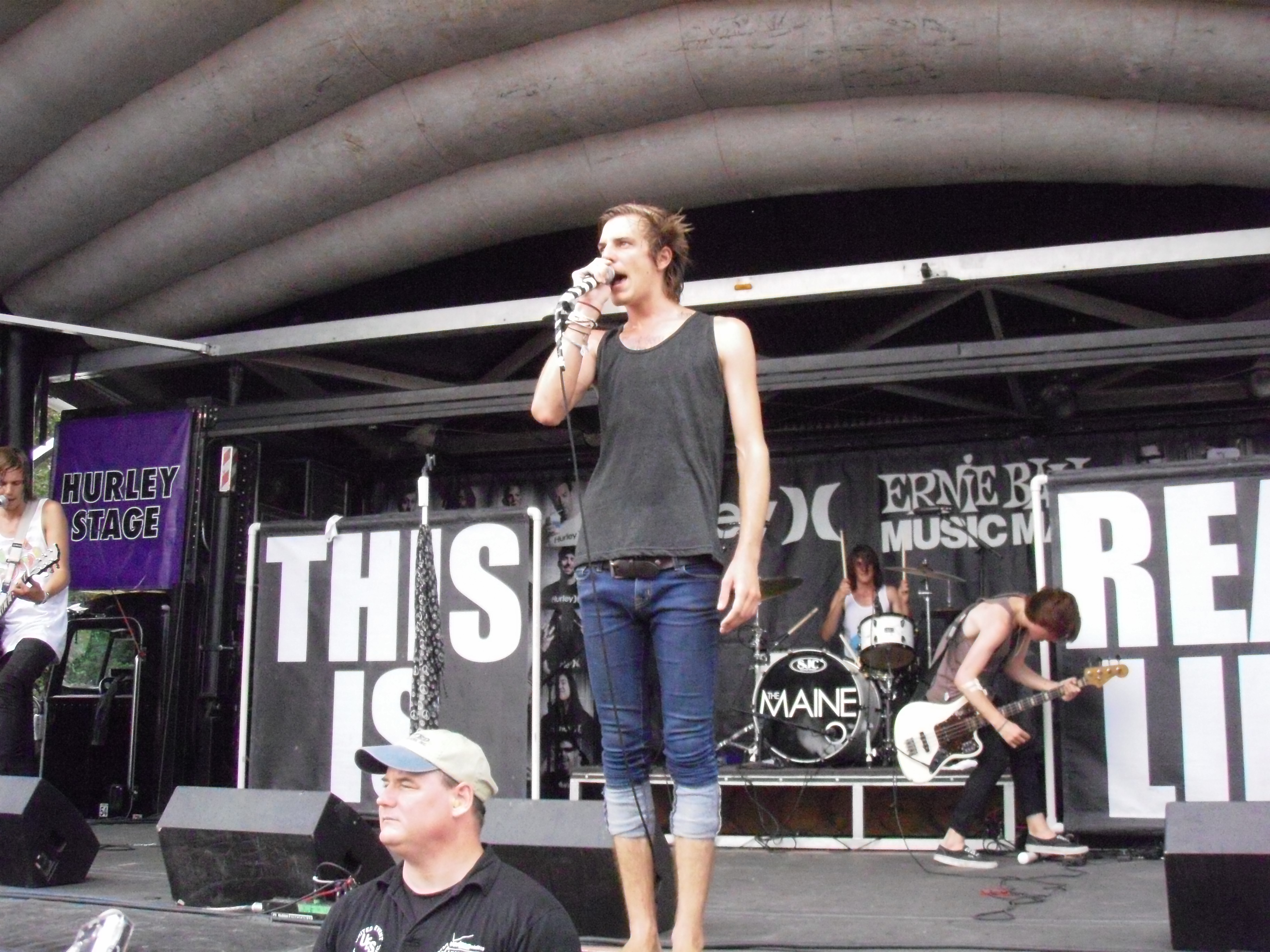
The Maine performing at Warped Tour in Charlotte, NC on July 23, 2009

The band released a holiday EP in December 2008, titled ...And a Happy New Year. The EP included three new original tracks and a cover of the Wham! song "Last Christmas". In February 2009, The Maine and We the Kings headlined the 'Secret Valentine' tour, along with The Cab, VersaEmerge and There For Tomorrow. In March 2009, the band co-headlined the Alternative Press Tour with 3OH!3 and support from Family Force 5, Hit the Lights and A Rocket to the Moon. On March 10, 2009, the group premiered a music video for their song "Girls Do What They Want". In June 2009, the band signed to Warner Bros. Records. "Into Your Arms" was released on June 15, 2009, for radio airplay as the album's lead single. The band re-issued a deluxe edition for Can't Stop, Won't Stop on July 14, 2009, via Warner Records. In July 2009, the band performed on the Vans Warped Tour. The music video for "Into Your Arms" premiered on July 24, 2009, via their MySpace page and was directed by Aaron Platt. In October and November, the group supported Boys Like Girls on their tour in the US.

=== Black and White (2010–2011) ===
The group worked with producer Howard Benson on their second studio album and was recorded in California. O'Callaghan described the album as a raw feel, free and loose record that was inspired by classic American rock-n-roll. "Inside of You" was released on May 3, 2010, as the lead single from the album. The song peaked at number 14 on the US Rock Digital Song Sales chart. "Growing Up" was released on May 17, as the second single from the album. "Right Girl" was made available for streaming on the group's MySpace page on July 8. The song peaked at number 25 on the US Rock Digital Song Sales chart. On July 12, their second studio album, Black & White was released. The album debuted at number 16 on the Billboard 200 and sold 22,634 copies first week. Black & White won the 2010 AP Magazine Readers' Awards for Album of the Year. "Inside of You" also won the award for Best Song of the Year.

In support of the album, the band embarked on their first headlining tour in 2010, An Evening with The Maine. The music video for "Right Girl" premiered on November 24, and was directed by Loren Brinton. In November 2010, the group joined Never Shout Never on the Harmony tour, where they had fans gather canned foods to help those in need. As a 'thank you' gift, both acts released a split EP titled Split - EP. On December 29, 2010, The Maine released the short film In Darkness and in Light on iTunes. In February 2011, The Maine set off on an international tour that began in the Philippines. The group traveled to Australia and performed at the 2011 Soundwave festival. The group toured across Europe starting in the UK in March 2011. The band co-headlined a U.S. tour with Augustana, lasting from early May to June 18, 2011. A music video for "Listen to Your Heart" premiered via PureVolume on July 1, 2011. The band toured with Taking Back Sunday and Bad Rabbits in October 2011.

=== Pioneer (2011–2012) ===
In June 2011, the band confirmed that they were working on their third studio album. The group performed a new track from the album, "Don't Give Up on "Us"" while on tour with Augustana and Austin Gibbs. The band recorded the album at Sonic Ranch in El Paso, Texas with producer Colby Wedgeworth. The album's lead single "Don't Give Up on "Us"" was made available for streaming on November 1, 2011. On that same day, the album's track listing and artwork were revealed. The album's second single "Some Day" was released on November 15, 2011. On December 2, Pioneer was made available for streaming along with the song "Misery". The album was officially released on December 6, 2011. The album was released independently via Action Theory despite being with Warner at the time. O'Callaghan revealed that the group fought to release the album before Warner agreed under the condition that the band would self-release the record. Pioneer peaked at number 90 on the Billboard 200 and in its first week, sold 12,000 copies.

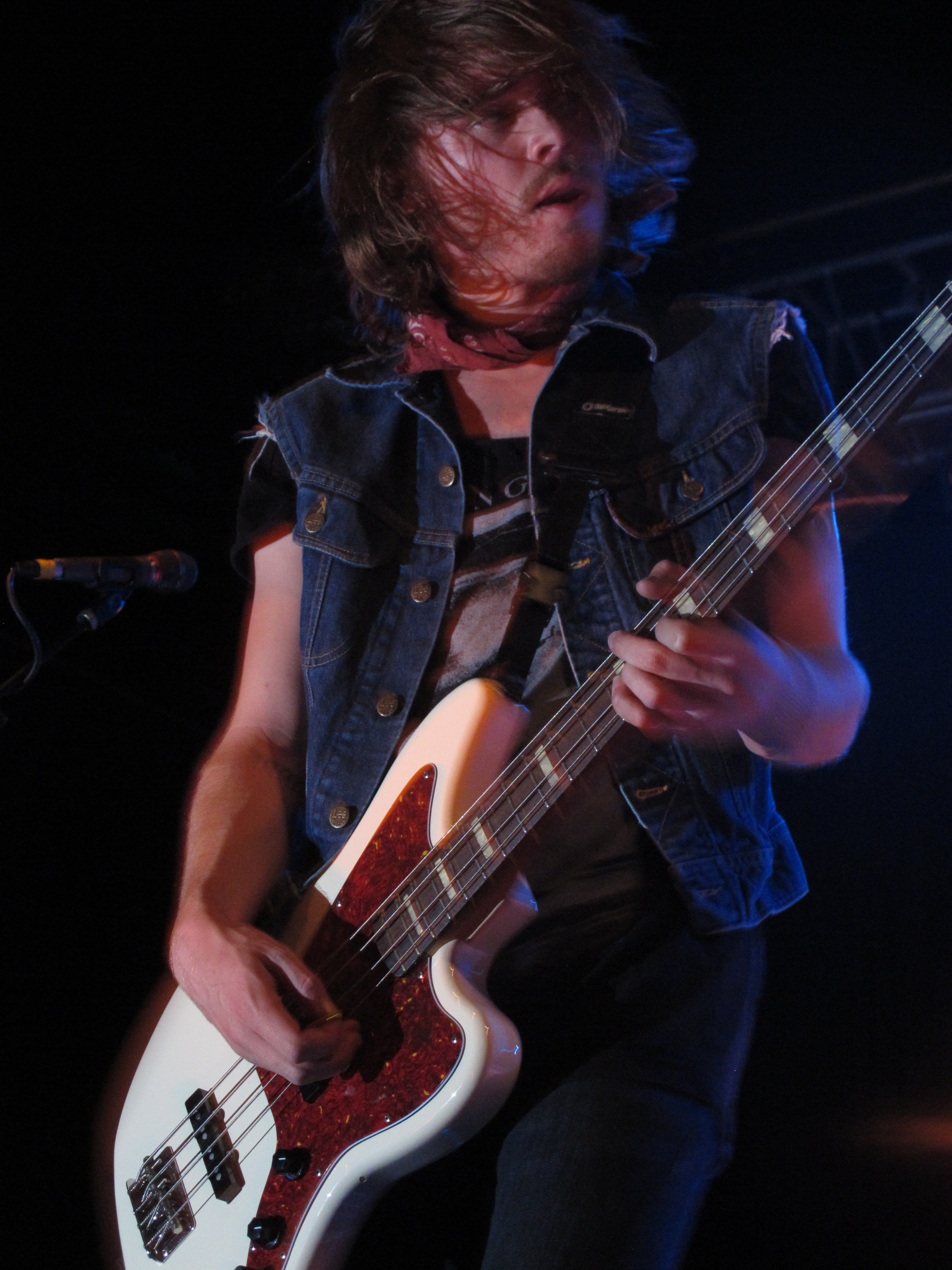
Bassist Garrett Nickelsen performing in 2012

In support of the album, the group embarked on the Pioneer Tour in the US. In January and February 2012, the band supported All Time Low on their UK tour. The group also toured across Europe in February 2012. The band released a music video for "Misery" on February 16, 2012. They later headlined the Pioneer World Tour, with support from Lydia and Arkells in the spring of 2012. On July 27, a music video was released for "Like We Did (Windows Down)".

On September 11, 2012, The Maine re-released Pioneer as Pioneer and The Good Love. The album, released via Rude Records, contains six new tracks. They also released an EP version of the unreleased tracks under the name of Good Love. In October and November, the group went on a co-headlining US tour with Mayday Parade and were supported by The Postelles.

=== Forever Halloween (2013–2014) ===
In February 2013, the group began recording their fourth studio album, working with producer Brendan Benson. The album was recorded on an analog tape, steering away from the use of computer editing techniques. The group finished recording the album the following month and was mixed and mastered in April. On April 12, 2013, the band announced that their fourth studio album Forever Halloween would be released on June 4, 2013. "Happy" was the first single released from the album on April 15, 2013. A promotional single titled, "Love and Drugs" was made available for streaming on May 7, 2013. A music video for the song "These Four Words" that premiered on YouTube and Vevo was released on the same day as the album. The single-shot video was directed by Daniel Gomes and the song is what frontman John O'Callaghan called the "most revealing song [he] has ever written." The album was released independently in the US in partnership with their management team 8123, via Universal Music in Canada, and Rude Records in Europe, UK, Australia and Japan. It sold over 10,000 copies in its first week, debuting at number 39 on the Billboard 200.

The group embarked on the US 8123 tour in the summer of 2013, with support from A Rocket to the Moon, This Century and Brighten. In October and November, the group co-headlined a US tour with Anberlin. The band released a five-song acoustic EP titled Imaginary Numbers on December 10, 2013. The first song from the EP, "Raining in Paris" was released November 5 via YouTube with a lyric video. The EP peaked at number 31 on the US Independent Albums chart. They toured in the UK in April 2014, before heading over to South America. The group performed at the 2014 Vans Warped Tour.

The Maine released a new single called "Ugly on the Inside" on May 21, 2014. The track was taken from the deluxe edition of Forever Halloween which was on June 17, 2014. The deluxe edition contains five additional bonus tracks, including "Ugly on the Inside".

=== American Candy (2015–2016) ===
The group began teasing their fifth studio album in the summer of 2014, before heading out to Heber, Arizona to write the album. It was recorded at Joshua Tree and was produced by Colby Wedgeworth. On January 6, 2015, the group revealed that their new album was titled American Candy, and was released on March 31, 2015. The first single from the album, "English Girls", dropped on February 10, 2015. The second single from the album, "Miles Away" was released on March 10, 2015. The song debuted at #16 on the iTunes Alternative Chart on March 10, 2015. "Same Suit, Different Tie" was released via SoundCloud the day before the album was set to release. To help promote the release, The Maine hosted "24 Hours of American Candy", where they live streamed their activities on the release day of American Candy. The album peaked at number 37 on the Billboard 200 and sold 15,000 copies first week.

In support of the album, the group went on a headlining North American tour in the spring of 2015 with Real Friends, Knuckle Puck and The Technicolors. From late August to early October, the band went on The Free For All Tour where every show of the tour was free-of-charge. They joined Mayday Parade on the Black Lines tour throughout Europe from January to February 2016. The group also co-headlined a US tour with Mayday Parade in March 2016. The band were also on the main stage for the entirety of the 2016 Vans Warped Tour. American Candy was nominated for Album of the Year at the 2016 Alternative Press Music Awards.

The Maine released Covers (Side A) in December 2015, followed by Covers (Side B) in June 2016, each containing 3-4 covers of popular songs.

=== Lovely Little Lonely (2017–2018) ===
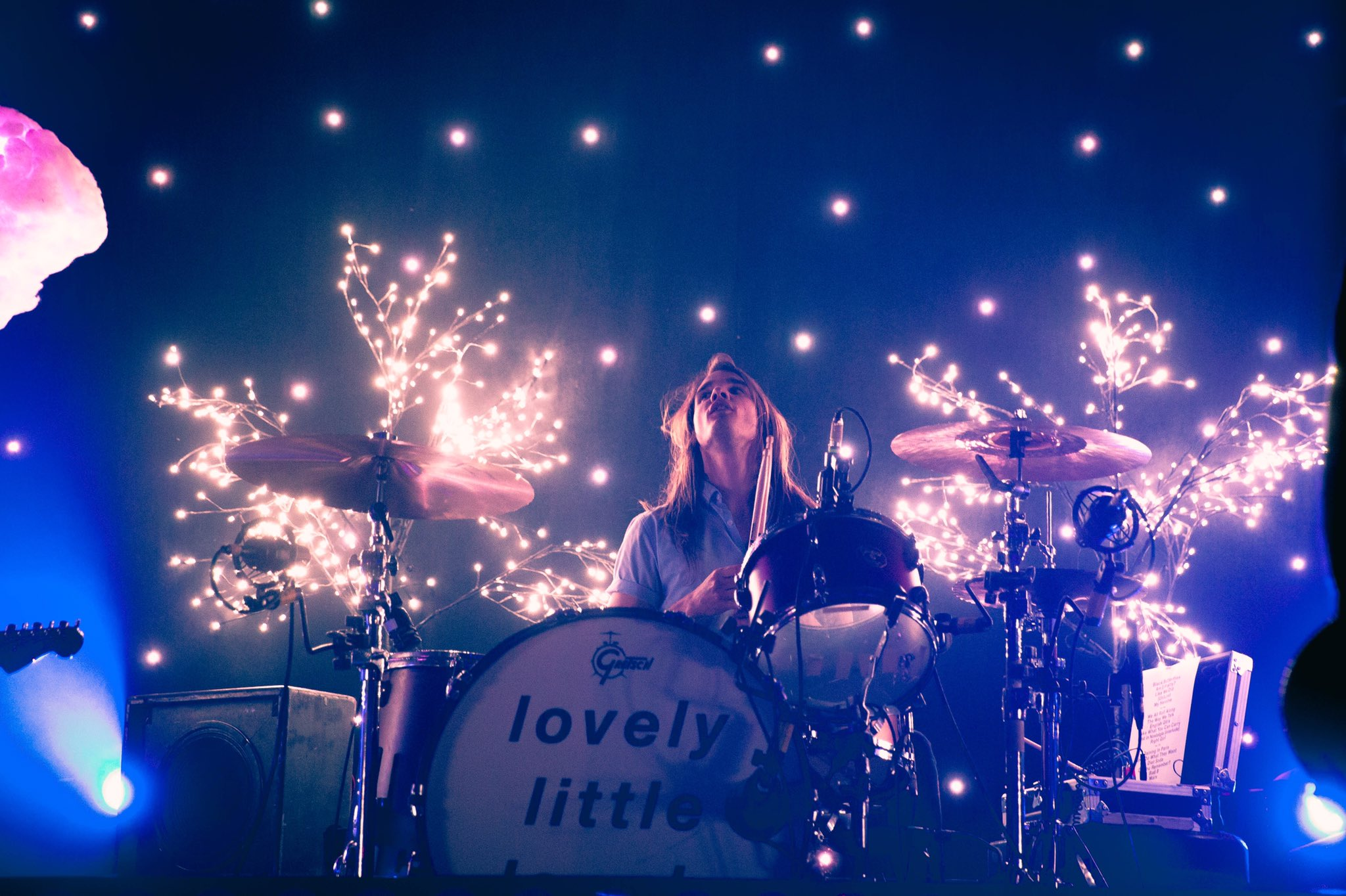
Pat Kirch performing on the Lovely Little Lonely tour at The Crofoot in Pontiac, Michigan, May 5, 2017.

Following 2016 Vans Warped Tour, the band headed into the studio to record their sixth studio album, scheduled for release in 2017. The group began recording the album in the fall of 2016 in New York City. They spent a week at the Brooklyn Patch with Colby Wedgeworth who produced the album. Once the week came to an end, the group headed over to Gualala, California to finish the rest of the album. The recording process was documented by the band and made into a mini YouTube series titled Miserable Youth.

On January 19, 2017, the group announced that their sixth studio album would be titled, Lovely Little Lonely and was released on April 7, 2017. Along with this announcement, they released the first single from the album, "Bad Behavior". The second single, "Black Butterflies and Deja Vu", was released on March 2, 2017. The album peaked at number 32 on the Billboard 200. On August 4, the group released an acoustic version of their third single from the album, "I Only Wanna Talk to You". The fourth single "How Do You Feel?" was released on August 11, 2017.

The Maine created and headlined the first 8123 Fest in honor of their 10-year anniversary and was held in their hometown of Phoenix, Arizona at the Crescent Ballroom. They also embarked on the Lovely Little Lonely World Tour which began in March to July 2017. In the summer of 2017, the group supported Dashboard Confessional on their headlining US tour. In October and November, the group embarked on The Modern Nostalgia Tour and were joined by Dreamers and Night Riots. They performed at the Vans Warped Tour in 2018.

=== You Are OK (2018–2020) ===
In October 2018, the group began working on their seventh studio album with producer Matt Squire. On December 6, 2018, frontman John O'Callaghan confirmed that recording for the album was complete. The title of the album, You Are OK, was announced on January 16, 2019, along with the release of the lead single, "Numb Without You". O'Callaghan came up with the title and stated that the reason was none other "than to speak to myself." He continued, "Selfish as it may be, I need to hear those words often, and if they somehow resonate like they did with this someone across the world then I accidentally did at least a little good while I was alive." "My Best Habit" was released on February 22, 2019, as the album's second single. The album's third single, "Broken Parts" was released on March 22, 2019. Upon You Are OK's release, lead guitarist Jared Monaco revealed he almost quit the group due to being caught in a place that forced him to balance his personal life with the band. The album peaked at number 52 on the Billboard 200. You Are OK also topped the US Independent Albums chart. The album won the award for Album of the Year at the 2019 Rock Sound Awards.

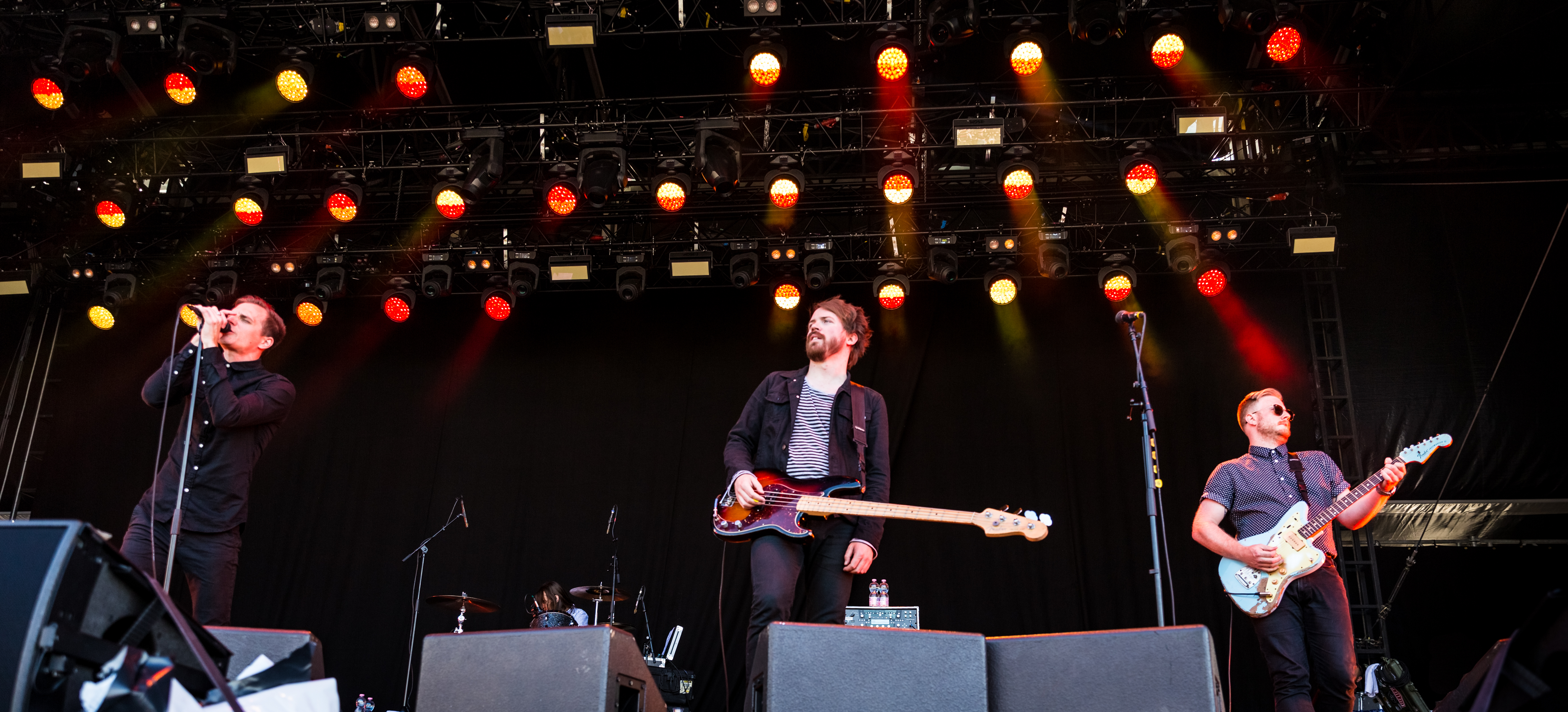
The Maine performing at the Rock am Ring 2018

The group celebrated the 10th anniversary of their first album Can't Stop Won't Stop and performed headlining sets on January 18 and 19, 2019, at their own music festival, 8123 Fest. In support of the album, the group toured across Europe, the US and Brazil from April to June 2019. During the US leg of the tour, they were joined by Taking Back Sunday. They performed at the 2019 Sad Summer Fest, a festival they founded. The band embarked on the Mirror Tour in the fall of 2019. Twin XL supported them during the tour.

=== XOXO: From Love and Anxiety in Real Time (2021–2022) ===
In June 2020, O'Callaghan confirmed that they have begun recording their eighth studio album and that ten tracks had already been written for the album. The album was recorded in Arizona. The album's lead single, "Sticky" was released on March 19, 2021. It was also the first song recorded on the album. The song peaked at number 16 on the US Alternative Airplay chart. "April 7th" was released as the album's second single on April 7, 2021. The album's third single, "Lips" was released on May 28, 2021. "Pretender" was released as the album's fourth single on June 25, 2021. XOXO: From Love and Anxiety in Real Time was officially released on July 9, 2021. The album peaked at number 32 on the US Independent Albums chart.

They embarked on the Sad Summer Fest in August 2021. To support the album, the band also toured in the fall in support of All Time Low. The group went on a headlining tour in the US called the "XOXO Tour" that began in March 2022.

In January 2022, the band released a new single titled, "Loved You a Little" featuring Taking Back Sunday and Charlotte Sands. The song peaked at number eight on the Billboard Alternative Airplay chart and at number 14 on the Rock Airplay chart. They performed at the So What?! Music Festival in May 2022. The group released another single in September 2022 titled "Box in a Heart", featuring Renforshort. In October 2022, the group performed at the When We Were Young Festival.

=== Self-titled album (2022–2024) ===
In late 2022, The Maine began teasing their 9th album and confirmed its writing. The group was also announced to be a part of Sad Summer Fest's 2023 lineup. On April 5, 2023, the band revived its web series "Miserable Youth" for a third season dedicated to showcasing the album's production, with episodes being released weekly.

The band officially announced their ninth album, The Maine, on June 8, 2023. The album was released on August 1, 2023, as a nod to their label 8123. Along with this announcement, the group released two new singles: "Blame" and "How to Exit a Room". The band worked with producer Colby Wedgeworth on the album. "Blame" peaked at number 25 on the US Alternative Airplay chart. A music video for their third single "Dose No. 2" was released on August 1, 2023. The album's fourth single, "Thoughts I Have While Lying in Bed" was released on August 30. A new version of the track was released on November 24, featuring Beach Weather. The song reached number 23 on the US Alternative Airplay chart. The band headlined the Sweet Sixteen tour in November 2023 in support of the album. The group joined Fall Out Boy on their So Much For (2our) Dust tour in February 2024. In May 2024, the band announced two shows in the Philippines for September as part of their the Sweet Sixteen tour.

=== Joy Next Door (2024–present) ===
In July 2024, the group co-headlined the fifth anniversary of the Sad Summer Festival with Mayday Parade. On July 10, the band released a new single titled, "Touch". The release of the single signified the end of their self-titled era as the message "The Maine is Dead" shown in the music video of the song. Ahead of 8123 Fest 2025, the group released a surprise EP titled Dyed (2008-2023) on January 15, 2025. The EP features nine tracks which were unreleased demos from each of their previous albums, with the artwork representing the colors from their respective records accompanied by specific dates within the song titles. On September 29, the group joined the Jonas Brothers on their Jonas20: Greetings from Your Hometown Tour in Phoenix, Arizona, as a surprise guest performing "Black Butterflies and Deja Vu". Shortly after, O'Callaghan confirmed that they were working on their tenth studio album.

On December 8, 2025, The Maine announced the "I Love You But I Chose The Maine" tour, their first headlining tour in over two years.

On January 22, 2026, the band announced the title for their tenth studio album, Joy Next Door, released on April 10, 2026. The band released the album's lead single "Die to Fall" on January 28. On February 25, the album's second single "Quiet Part Loud" was released. It was also announced that they would be performing on The Kelly Clarkson Show to support the album's release. The band released the album's third single "Palms" on March 24.

== Musical style and influences ==
The Maine's music style has generally been regarded as alternative rock, pop punk, pop rock, emo pop, and emo. Magazine Alternative Press has referred to them as neon pop-punk. The group cites major influences from Third Eye Blind, Death Cab for Cutie and Ivory.

Their debut studio album Can't Stop Won't Stop has been described as a pop rock and pop punk record. The album drew comparison to their pop punk peers such as Metro Station and All Time Low. The group opted for a different sound and sees them "stepping out of their comfort zone" on their second studio album Black & White. The album features influences of rock and roll while also incorporating the sounds of melodic pop rock. Their third studio album, Pioneer sees the group depart from their pop punk roots and focus on the 90s' alternative rock sound, as well as continuing with their rock and roll sound. Their fourth studio album, Forever Halloween continues with the 90s' alternative rock sound. On their fifth studio album, American Candy, the group experiments with new sounds such as indie rock and new wave, while maintaining their alternative rock and pop rock sound. Their sixth studio album, Lovely Little Lonely features themes of somber, sad and darker sounds with a counterbalance of pop arrangements. Their eighth studio album, You Are OK has been described as alternative rock and sees the group experimenting with EDM and progressive rock sounds.

== Band members ==
Current members

- John O'Callaghan – lead vocals, piano (2007–present), rhythm guitar (2007–2009, 2014–present)
- Jared Monaco – lead guitar (2007–present)
- Garrett Nickelsen – bass, synth (2007–present)
- Patrick Kirch – drums, percussion (2007–present)
- Kennedy Brock – rhythm guitar, backing vocals (2007–present), lead guitar (2007–2009, 2014–present)

Live touring members

- Drew Destefano – keyboards, rhythm guitar, percussion (2014–2017)
- Adam Simons – keyboards, rhythm and lead guitar, percussion (2018–2020)

Former members

- Ryan Osterman – lead guitar (2007)
- Alex Ross – rhythm guitar (2007)

== Discography ==
Studio albums

- Can't Stop Won't Stop (2008)
- Black & White (2010)
- Pioneer (2011)
- Forever Halloween (2013)
- American Candy (2015)
- Lovely Little Lonely (2017)
- You Are OK (2019)
- XOXO: From Love and Anxiety in Real Time (2021)
- The Maine (2023)
- Joy Next Door (2026)

== Other media ==
Aside from recording music, The Maine has other projects it undertakes for its fans. The band has released three books, This Is Real Life, Black & White Keepsake Book, and Roads. This Is Real Life is composed of photos taken by the band's friend and photographer Dirk Mai, as well as journal entries written by the band members during the 2009 Vans Warped Tour. Black & White Keepsake Book consists of photos and journals from the band members. Roads contains behind-the-scenes photos that Dirk Mai has captured as well as pieces of writing from the band members. Later in 2010, lead singer John O'Callaghan collaborated with photographer Dirk Mai in the creation of Exaltation, a book containing 15 poems written by O'Callaghan complemented by nine accompanying photographs by Mai. John O'Callaghan released a book of poetry titled Sincerely, John The Ghost in 2016 to accompany his solo EP of the same name. In 2019, the band collaborated with the writer Evan Lucy on You Are Ok: Finding Your Way When Life Doesn't Feel Ok, a book featuring stories and lessons from the band's career that was released along the album of the same name.

The band also holds a biannual music festival in Phoenix called 8123 Fest. The first of these festivals was held in 2017, to celebrate the 10th anniversary of The Maine's formation. Since then, 8123 Fest has also been held in 2019, 2022, and 2025, with the next scheduled for 2027, commemorating the 20th anniversary of the band.

== Tours ==
Headlining

- An Evening with The Maine (2010)
- The Maine Presents: Pioneer (2011)
- The Maine Presents: The Pioneer World Tour (2012)
- The 8123 Tour (2013)
- An Acoustic Evening with The Maine (2014)
- Farewell Forever Halloween (2014)
- The American Candy Spring Tour (2015)
- Free For All Tour (Summer-Fall 2015)
- The Maine Australian Tour (2015)
- An 8123 Holiday Tour (2015)
- The Lovely Little Lonely World Tour (2017)
- Modern Nostalgia Tour (2017)
- Fry Your Brain with The Maine (2018)
- The Mirror Tour (2019)
- The XOXO Tour (2022)
- The Sweet Sixteen Tour (2023)
- I Love You But I Chose The Maine (2026)

Co-Headlining

- Never Shout Never – The Harmony Tour (North American and European legs) (2010)
- Augustana – The Maine & Augustana (2011)
- Mayday Parade – The Maine & Mayday special guests The Postelles (2012)
- Anberlin – Anberlin & The Maine (2013)
- Mayday Parade – The American Lines Tour (North American and European legs) (2016)
- Mayday Parade & State Champs - Sad Summer Festival (2019)
- Mayday Parade - Sad Summer Festival (2024)

Opening

- Soundtrack of Your Summer Tour (2008)
- The Compromising of Integrity, Morality and Principles in Exchange for Money Tour (2008)
- Taking Back Sunday 20th Anniversary Tour (2019)
- Sad Summer Festival (2021, 2023)
- Fall Out Boy - So Much for (2)ourdust

== Awards and nominations ==
Year	Association	Category	Nominated work	Result	Ref.
2009	Arizona Ska Punk Awards	Best Rock Band	The Maine	Won	
2009	Arizona Ska Punk Awards	Best New Artist	The Maine	Won	
2010	Libby Awards	—N/a	The Maine	Won	
2010	AP Magazine Readers' Awards	Album of the Year	Black & White	Won	
2010	AP Magazine Readers' Awards	Best Song of the Year	"Inside of You"	Won	
2010	AP Magazine Readers' Awards	Best Live Band	The Maine	Won	
2010	Arizona Ska Punk Awards	Video of the Year	"Into Your Arms"	Won	
2010	Arizona Ska Punk Awards	Song of the Year	"Santa Stole My Girlfriend"	Won	
2016	Alternative Press Music Awards	Album of the Year	American Candy	Nominated	
2016	Alternative Press Music Awards	Most Dedicated Fanbase	The Maine	Nominated	
2017	Alternative Press Music Awards	Best Vocalist	John O'Callaghan	Nominated	
2017	Rock Sound Awards	Power of Music Award	The Maine	Won	
2019	Rock Sound Awards	Album of the Year	You Are OK	Won	
