= The Maine (album) =

2023 album by The Maine

Studio album by the Maine
- Released: August 1, 2023
- Recorded: 2023
- Studio: 8123 Studios
- Genre: Pop rock
- Length: 36:16
- Labels: 8123; Photo Finish
- Producer: Colby Wedgeworth

The Maine chronology
XOXO: From Love and Anxiety in Real Time (2021)	The Maine (2023)	Dyed (2008-2023) (2025)

Singles from The Maine
- 1. "Blame" Released: June 9, 2023; 2. "How to Exit a Room" Released: June 9, 2023; 3. "Dose No. 2" Released: August 1, 2023; 4. "Thoughts I Have While Lying in Bed" Released: August 30, 2023; 5. "Leave in Five" Released: December 29, 2023

The Maine is the ninth studio album by American rock band the Maine, released on August 1, 2023, via 8123 and Photo Finish Records.

== Background and recording ==
"I'll remember a lot from recording No. 9, but the thing I'll remember most fondly is the sense of a forgotten youth I felt throughout the process. Much of it had to do with reuniting with [producer] Colby Wedgeworth, and much of it had to do with an idea in my head that resounded, 'What if this is the last time?'"

— John O'Callaghan on writing and recording their ninth studio album.

In late 2022, the Maine began teasing their ninth album and confirmed its writing. On April 5, 2023, the band revived its web series Miserable Youth for a third season dedicated to showcasing the album's production, with episodes being released weekly.

The group worked with Colby Wedgeworth to help produce the album. The third track, "Blame" was written by John O'Callaghan and has been described as a "self-reflective song" that explores the theme of accepting responsibility for past mistakes and the desire to make amends. O'Callaghan stated, "This tune is more or less about both placing and accepting blame for things I wish I could redo. The only rub is I can't go backwards, only forwards."

== Composition ==
Bassist Garrett Nickelsen stated that the group wanted to make "a great live album" that would "be fun to play in front of people and make people dance and just let loose." He also added that the band wanted to make the record "sound different from the rest," striving to revolutionize their sound by bringing in new influences. Drummer Pat Kirch took an interesting approach, recording the drums and cymbals separately.

"We were listening to interviews with bands, and the band Phoenix and Harry Styles recorded their drums that way, and it was really shocking and bizarre to us on how to do that and make it not sound disjointed."

Tracks such as "I Think About You All the Time" and "Thoughts I Have While Lying in Bed" were inspired by different stages of falling in love, according to O'Callaghan. The claps featured on "Blame" was a "happy little accident," thought of by O'Callaghan while the band was in Franklin, Tennessee, with producer Colby Wedgeworth. "Cars and Caution" was inspired by Grateful Dead. Nickelsen described the first track, "Dose No. 2" as "math rock." The last track, "Spiraling" was written by O'Callaghan, in which the song was originally not intended to be on the album and was written for another artist. However, guitarist Jared Monaco, wanted to do the song and Kirch suggested the track be put as the final track on the album.

== Release ==
The band officially announced their ninth album, The Maine, on June 8, 2023. The album would be released on August 1, 2023, due to the date being written as 8.1.23, reflecting the significance the number 8123 has to the group. It was the number of the parking garage where the band would get together as childhood friends and as a result has been used in their song's lyrics, is the title of their own record label, and is also on the band's own 8123 Festival.

Along with this announcement, the group released two new singles: "Blame" and "How to Exit a Room". A music video for "Blame" was released on June 9, 2023, and was directed by Guadalupe Bustos. The video was filmed in the band's hometown of Phoenix, Arizona and was shot at the Nile Theater. The music video for "How to Exit a Room" premiered on July 25, 2023. Shot in black and white, the video shows O'Callaghan riding a horse through the desert features. A music video for "Dose No. 2" was released on August 1, 2023. A music video for "Thoughts I Have While Lying in Bed" premiered on August 30, 2023. Directed by Nick Stafford, the video was filmed in Cincinnati. The song has garnered over 650,000 streams. In November 2023, the group released a new version of the track featuring Beach Weather. On December 29, the band released a new version of "Leave in Five", featuring Mandy Lee of MisterWives.

In January 2024, the group released the deluxe edition of their self-titled album, which features re-recorded tracks of "Thoughts I Have While Lying In Bed", "Leave in Five" and "Blame", featuring Beach Weather, MisterWives and Valley, respectively, and a wedding version of "Funny How?".

== Promotion ==
The Maine celebrated the album's release with fans in Denver, Colorado for 8123 Day, where they headlined the Fillmore Auditorium with support from Real Friends and Knuckle Puck. The band headlined the Sweet 16 tour in November 2023 in support of the album. The group also supported Fall Out Boy on their So Much for Dust tour in February 2024.

== Critical reception ==
Professional ratings
Review scores
Source	Rating
Melodic	3/5 stars

The Maine was met with mixed to positive reviews. Adam Grundy of Chorus.fm stated, "The pacing on the new record is electric and frenetic, while still allowing a few songs to brood in the darkness to fit the overall mood and aesthetic of the black & white album artwork." He praised O'Callaghan's vocals on the first track "Dose No. 2" as well as Pat Kirch's drumming on the album's lead single "Blame". He described the fourth track, "Leave in Five" as a "straight-forward dance rocker" song, praising Jared Monaco and Kennedy Brock's guitar work and comparing it to the 1975. He also complimented Garrett Nickelsen's "pulsating bass line" on the sixth track, "I Think About You All the Time" and called "How to Exit a Room" the standout track on the album. Kaj Roth of Melodic stated, "The music don't come with any surprises but instead a package of upbeat singalong choruses that is easy to like, however I get the feeling The Maine can so much more. It's not memorable enough." Helen Ainsley of Official Charts Company listed it as one of the best albums of 2023. She stated, "a nostalgic rock album with a tasty sprinkling of poppy '80s influences – contains so many incredible tracks and attention-grabbing moments." Maria Serra of idobi Radio praised the band's growth in songwriting. She remarked, "Tracks such as 'Blame', and 'Dose No. 2' are ethereal disco dance tracks juxtaposed with the slow love song 'Funny How?' are the clear culmination of love for fans who are young and young at heart."

=== Accolades ===
Accolades for The Maine
Publication	Accolade	Year	Rank	Ref.
idobi Radio	Best Albums of 2023	2023	Unranked	
Rock Sound	Top 50 Albums of 2023	2023	30	
Official Charts Company	Best Albums of 2023	2023	Unranked	
Chorus.fm	Top 30 Albums of 2023	2023	8	

== Track listing ==
Standard edition
No.	Title	Writer(s)	Length
1.	"Dose No. 2"	Garrett Nickelsen; Jared Monaco; John O'Callaghan; Kennedy Brock; Pat Kirch; Andrew Goldstein	2:54
2.	"How to Exit a Room"	Nickelsen; Monaco; O'Callaghan; Brock; Kirch; Colby Wedgeworth	3:44
3.	"Blame"	Nickelsen; Monaco; O'Callaghan; Brock; Kirch; Goldstein	3:10
4.	"Leave in Five"	Nickelsen; Monaco; O'Callaghan; Brock; Kirch; Wedgeworth	3:37
5.	"The Mood I'm In / JSYK"	Nickelsen; Monaco; O'Callaghan; Brock; Kirch; Goldstein	3:31
6.	"I Think About You All the Time"	Nickelsen; Monaco; O'Callaghan; Brock; Kirch; Goldstein	3:16
7.	"Thoughts I Have While Lying in Bed"	Nickelsen; Monaco; O'Callaghan; Brock; Kirch; Wedgeworth	3:39
8.	"Funny How?"	Nickelsen; Monaco; O'Callaghan; Brock; Kirch	3:36
9.	"Cars & Caution Signs"	Nickelsen; Monaco; O'Callaghan; Brock; Kirch	5:00
10.	"Spiraling"	Nickelsen; Monaco; O'Callaghan; Brock; Kirch; Sean Silverman	3:44
Total length:			36:16

Deluxe edition
No.	Title	Length
11.	"Thoughts I Have While Lying in Bed" (featuring Beach Weather)	3:39
12.	"Funny How?" (wedding version)	3:34
13.	"Blame" (featuring Valley)	3:10
14.	"Leave in Five" (featuring MisterWives)	3:37

== Personnel ==
Credits retrieved from album's liner notes.

The Maine

- John O'Callaghan – vocals, composer, lyricist, guitar, keyboard
- Kennedy Brock – rhythm guitar, backing vocals, composer, lyricist
- Jared Monaco – lead guitar, composer, lyricist
- Garrett Nickelsen – bass guitar, composer, lyricist
- Pat Kirch – drums, percussion, composer, lyricist

Additional musicians

- Andrew Goldstein – composer, lyricist (1, 3, 5, 6)
- Colby Wedgeworth – additional vocals, composer, lyricist (2, 4, 7)
- Sean Silverman – composer, lyricist (10)
- Bob Hoag – additional percussion

Additional personnel

- Colby Wedgeworth – producer
- Rich Raun – artwork, creative director
- Gillian Sloan – setup
- Chelsea Dunstall – management
- Kyle Dehn – management
- Tim Kirch – management
- Randy Merrill – mastering (Sterling Sound, Nashville, Tennessee)
- Doug Weier – mixing
- Bob Hoag – recording
- Austin Gavin – drum technician

== Release history ==
Release history for The Maine
Region	Date	Format	Label	Ref.
Various	August 1, 2023	CD; digital download; streaming; vinyl	8123; Photo Finish	
Various	January 12, 2024	Digital download; streaming	8123; Photo Finish	
