= Pioneer (The Maine album) =

Studio album by The Maine
- Released: December 6, 2011
- Recorded: 2011
- Genre: Alternative rock
- Length: 61:45
- Label: Action Theory
- Producers: The Maine; Colby Wedgeworth

The Maine chronology
Black & White (2010)	Pioneer (2011)	Forever Halloween (2013)

Alternative covers
- Pioneer and the Good Love cover

Singles from Pioneer
- 1. "Don't Give Up on "Us"" Released: November 15, 2011; 2. "Some Days" Released: November 15, 2011; 3. "You'll Never Know" Released: August 14, 2012

Pioneer is the third full-length studio album by The Maine. The album sold over 12,000 copies in its first week, debuting at number 90 on the Billboard 200. The album was released on December 6, 2011, via Action Theory, and was produced by the band and Colby Wedgeworth. In support of the album, they embarked on the Pioneer World Tour in 2012.

== Background ==
In the winter of 2010, the group began writing songs for Pioneer. In May and June 2011, they went on a co-headlining US tour with Augustana. During the tour, the group debuted several new songs. On June 5, they revealed that they had started recording their next album before the tour began, and were going to continue following the tour's conclusion. Recording took place at Sonic Ranch in El Paso, Texas with producer Colby Wedgeworth. During the session, they wrote nine tracks, before returning to Wedgeworth's studio to record an additional 18 tracks. The group ended up recording 27 songs total and picked 13 tracks they felt belonged on the record. On June 22, the group performed a new track titled "Don't Give Up on "Us"" on Fuel TV.

== Release ==
In October and November, the group supported Taking Back Sunday on their headlining US tour. On October 5, Alternative Press reported that the group's next album would be titled Pioneer and was due for released in either late November or early December. On October 27, the group announced that the album would be released in December. In addition, a trailer was released which featured a snippet of a new track titled "Some Days". In November and December, the group went on a headlining US tour. On November 1, "Don't Give Up on "Us"" was made available for streaming. Later that day, the album's track listing and artwork were revealed. On November 6, a lyric video was released for "Don't Give Up on "Us"". On November 9, the group released a video of them making the album. On November 15, "Some Days" was made available for streaming. A lyric video was released for the track on November 21. Leading up to the album's release, the group posted track-by-track videos of some songs from Pioneer. The song "Jenny" was dedicated to John O'Callaghan's mother, while "Like We Did (Windows Down)" was described as a song about the past, which O'Callaghan said that the song was similar to the material from Can't Stop, Won't Stop.

On December 2, Pioneer was made available for streaming, before being released on December 6 through the band's own label, Action Theory. "Misery" was made available for streaming on December 2, 2011. The album features singles "Don't Give Up On Us" and "Some Days." Despite being signed to Warner Bros. Records at the time, the album was released through Action Theory. According to John O'Callaghan, the band "fought to release the album" and eventually agreed to self-release the record and that it would not count toward their seven records contractually deal with the label. The album was "a year-long fight to get released" and the band even considered changing their band name to get out of contractual obligations. They ultimately parted ways with Warner Records in 2012. To promote its release, the group held a livestream event via Stickam called This Is Pioneer. It featured a documentary on the making of the album and a concert where the band performed material from all of their previous albums and EPs. Shortly afterwards, the group performed at the Unsilent Night festival. In January and February 2012, the band supported All Time Low on their UK tour. On January 22, the group released "Take Me Dancing", an outtake from the album, as a free download. On February 5, a lyric video was released for the track. On February 16, a music video was released for the song. Later in February, the group embarked on a European tour.

Between April and June, the group went on a headlining US tour with support from Lydia and Arkells. On July 27, a music video was released for "Like We Did (Windows Down)". A behind-the-scenes video was subsequently released. On September 11, Pioneer was reissued in the UK through Rude Records. Under the new title Pioneer & the Good Love, it featured new artwork and six new songs. The new songs were also released separately on the Good Love EP, which was released on the same day. A behind-the-scenes video of the group recording the new songs was also released. On September 30, the group performed at the Bazooka Rocks Festival in the Philippines. On October 11, the band released an alternative version of "Like We Did (Windows Down)" under the name "Like We Did (When We Were Lost)". They explained it was "a more abstract take on friendship and adventure". In October and November, the group went on a co-headlining US tour with Mayday Parade. They were supported by The Postelles. On October 16, the band released a documentary titled, Anthem For A Dying Breed, detailing the recording process of the album. On October 20, the group released a music video for "Thinking of You".

== Critical reception ==
Professional ratings
Review scores
Source	Rating
AbsolutePunk	75%
AllMusic	3/5 stars
Alternative Addiction	4/5 stars
Alternative Press	4/5 stars

Pioneer was met with positive reviews from music critics. Chrysta Cherrie of AllMusic gave a positive review praising the group for their "stripped-down and mature effort" on the album. She compared the group to the likes of Kings of Leon, Fountains of Wayne and Old 97's. In another positive review by Scott Heisel of Alternative Press he remarked, "we never would've guessed the Maine would be the ones putting out rock records this consistently unique, interesting and, well, great." He complimented the band for changing up their sound that make them stand out among their peers. Thomas Nassiff of AbsolutePunk stated, "Pioneer is actually a real rock record. Sure, it's still corny as all hell and the lyrics are nothing to be too proud of, but there are guitar solos here that don't suck, there are melodies that aren't annoying." Alternative Addiction complimented the record stating, "Well written songs and not overcomplicating things in the studio makes a good album. The Maine has a good grasp on this right now and they're better for it. Other bands need to take lessons from these guys on sticking to what they want to do and how they do it."

== Track listing ==
All lyrics written by John O'Callaghan, all music composed by The Maine.

No.	Title	Length
1.	"Identify"	3:37
2.	"My Heroine"	3:36
3.	"Time"	3:28
4.	"Some Days"	3:55
5.	"I'm Sorry"	4:21
6.	"Don't Give Up on "Us""	3:35
7.	"Misery"	3:53
8.	"When I'm at Home"	4:26
9.	"Thinking of You"	3:02
10.	"Jenny"	4:15
11.	"Like We Did (Windows Down)"	4:08
12.	"While Listening to Rock & Roll..."	4:46
13.	"Waiting for My Sun to Shine" (contains hidden track "One Pack of Smokes")	14:43
Total length:		61:45

Pioneer and the Good Love bonus tracks
No.	Title	Length
14.	"I Want You"	3:51
15.	"I'm Leaving"	4:16
16.	"You'll Never Know"	3:53
17.	"Goodbye"	3:29
18.	"Take Me Dancing"	5:07
19.	"Hello World"	3:38
20.	"Good Love"	5:16
Total length:		1:31:15

== Personnel ==
Credits for Pioneer adapted from AllMusic.

Members

- John O'Callaghan – lead vocals, piano
- Jared Monaco – lead guitar
- Kennedy Brock – rhythm guitar, vocals
- Garrett Nickelsen – bass guitar
- Pat Kirch – drums, percussion

Production

- Tim Kirch – Art direction, design, management
- Adrian Lozano – Engineering
- Dirk Mai – Art direction, design, photography
- The Maine – Composer, engineer, producer
- Kyle Miller – Design
- John O'Callaghan – Art direction, design
- Matt Salveson – Engineering
- Matthew Van Gasbeck – Engineering, keyboard
- Colby Wedgeworth – Engineering, mastering, mixing, producer

== Charts ==
Chart performance for Pioneer
Chart (2011)	Peak position
US Billboard 200	90
US Top Alternative Albums (Billboard)	11
US Independent Albums (Billboard)	6
US Top Rock Albums (Billboard)	14
