= The Maine Presents: The Pioneer World Tour =

2012 concert tour by the Maine

- Tour by The Maine
- Promotional poster for the tour
- Associated album: Pioneer
- Start date: March 31, 2012
- End date: September 26, 2012
- Legs: 4
- No. of shows: 1 in Asia; 32 in North America; 6 in South America; 10 in Europe; 49 in total

The Maine concert chronology
- The Maine Presents: Pioneer (2011); The Maine Presents: The Pioneer World Tour (2012); The 8123 Tour (2013)

The Maine Presents: The Pioneer World Tour is the third concert tour by the American rock band the Maine, in support of their third studio album Pioneer (2011). The tour consisted of 49 shows in the Philippines, North America, Brazil, United Kingdom, Europe and Argentina. the tour launched at SM North Edsa Skydome in Quezon City, Philippines on March 31, 2012.

== Opening acts ==
- Lydia
- Arkells (selected dates)
- This Century

== Setlist ==
According to PropertyOfZach.

1. "Identify"
2. "My Heroine"
3. "Listen To Heart"
4. "Thinking of You"
5. "This is the End"
6. "While Listening to Rock & Roll"
7. "Some Days"
8. "We'll All Be..."
9. "Every Road"
10. "Into Your Arms"
11. "Misery"
12. "When I'm at Home"
13. "Inside of You"
14. "Take Me Dancing"
15. "The Way We Talk"
16. "Like We Did (Windows Down)"
17. "Right Girl"
18. "With a Little Help from My Friends"
19. "Don't Give Up on "Us""

== Tour dates ==
Date	City	Country	Venue
Asia
March 31, 2012	Quezon City	Philippines	SM North Edsa Skydome
North America
May 1, 2012	Indianapolis	United States	Old National Centre
May 2, 2012	Cleveland	United States	House of Blues
May 3, 2012	Columbus	United States	Newport Music Hall
May 4, 2012	Raleigh	United States	Lincoln Theatre
May 5, 2012	Norfolk	United States	The Norva
May 6, 2012	Philadelphia	United States	Theatre of Living Arts
May 8, 2012	Allentown	United States	Crocodile Rock
May 9, 2012	Toronto	Canada	Phoenix Concert Theatre
May 10, 2012	Montreal	Canada	L.A. Tulipe
May 11, 2012	Clifton Park	United States	Northern Lights
May 12, 2012	Silver Spring	United States	The Fillmore
May 13, 2012	Pittsburgh	United States	Mr. Small's Theatre
May 15, 2012	New York City	United States	Santos Party House
May 16, 2012	New York City	United States	Santos Party House
May 17, 2012	Poughkeepsie	United States	The Chance Theatre
May 18, 2012	Boston	United States	House of Blues
May 20, 2012	New Haven	United States	Toad's Place
May 22, 2012	Williamsville	United States	Club Infinity
May 23, 2012	Detroit	United States	St. Andrews Hall
May 24, 2012	Milwaukee	United States	The Rave
May 25, 2012	Minneapolis	United States	Varsity Theatre
May 26, 2012	Winnipeg	Canada	Garrick Centre
May 27, 2012	Saskatoon	Canada	Louis' Pub
May 29, 2012	Edmonton	Canada	The Starlight
May 30, 2012	Calgary	Canada	Macewan Ballroom
June 1, 2012	Vancouver	Canada	The Vogue Theatre
June 2, 2012	Seattle	United States	Showbox at the Market
June 3, 2012	Portland	United States	Hawthorne Theatre
June 6, 2012	San Francisco	United States	The Fillmore
June 7, 2012	Anaheim	United States	City National Grove of Anaheim
June 8, 2012	San Diego	United States	House of Blues
June 9, 2012	Tempe	United States	The Marquee
South America
July 27, 2012	Curitiba	Brazil	Music Hall
July 28, 2012	São Paulo	Brazil	HSBC Brasil
July 29, 2011	Rio de Janeiro	Brazil	Circo Voador
August 1, 2012	Belo Horizonte	Brazil	Music Hall
August 2, 2012	Porto Alegre	Brazil	Bar Opiniao
August 4, 2012	Buenos Aires	Argentina	Teatro Vorterix
Europe
September 15, 2012	Amsterdam	Netherlands	Sugar Factory
September 16, 2012	Hamburg	Germany	Logo
September 17, 2012	Cologne	Germany	Underground
September 20, 2012	Birmingham	United Kingdom	Academy 2
September 21,2012	Manchester	United Kingdom	Academy 2
September 22,2012	Leeds	United Kingdom	Cockpit
September 24, 2012	Glasgow	United Kingdom	Garage
September 25, 2012	Nottingham	United Kingdom	Rescue Rooms
September 26,2012	London	United Kingdom	Electric Ballroom
