= Forever Halloween =

Studio album by The Maine
- Released: June 4, 2013
- Recorded: February and March 2013
- Genre: Alternative rock
- Length: 45:12
- Label: 8123
- Producer: Brendan Benson

The Maine chronology
Pioneer (2011)	Forever Halloween (2013)	Imaginary Numbers (2013)

Alternative cover
- Forever Halloween (Deluxe Version) cover

Singles from Forever Halloween
- 1. "Happy" Released: April 16, 2013; 2. "Ugly on the Inside" Released: May 21, 2014

Forever Halloween is the fourth full-length studio album by American rock band The Maine, released on June 4, 2013 through the band's own label, 8123 Records. The album received generally positive reviews from critics. The album spawned two singles: "Happy" and "Ugly on the Inside".

== Background and recording ==
In October and November 2012, the group went on a co-headlining US tour with Mayday Parade. Following the tour's conclusion, the group began working on their next album.

The album, produced by Brendan Benson of The Raconteurs, is the band's second consecutive self-funded release following their departure from Warner Bros. Records and marks their first release under their own label, 8123. "To be seen and treated as an equal by someone you hold in high regard is a gratifying and refreshing feeling," says frontman John O'Callaghan on working with Benson. "[He] opened his studio doors, did that and much more which helped provide the platform to create an album we can now all stand behind." It was recorded in Nashville, Tennessee. Steering away from having to use computer editing techniques, the band recorded the album through an analog tape, which guitarist Kennedy Brock stated, "We had never done anything like that — we all recorded everything at the same time. Bands do live records, but vocals are usually done later, but he [John] was sitting there doing it." O'Callaghan described the album as their "most honest" to date. The group posted a studio update video on February 13. Throughout the month and March, the group constantly posted studio update videos. On March 9, the group announced they had finished recording. On April 4, it was announced that the album was mixed and mastered.

== Release ==
On April 12, 2013, Forever Halloween was announced for release in June. In addition, the album's artwork was revealed. On April 16, "Happy" was made available for streaming. On May 7, a lyric video was released for "Love and Drugs". The track was also available as a free download. On May 23, a behind-the-scenes video on the making of the album was posted online. On May 31, "Birthday in Los Angeles" and "Blood Red" were released exclusively for streaming via Billboard. The album was released on June 4. It was released in the US in partnership with the group's management team Eighty One Twenty Three, and Rude Records internationally. On the same day, a music video was released for "These Four Words". In June and July, the group went on the 8123 tour in North America alongside A Rocket to the Moon, This Century and Brighten. In September, the group went on a tour of Australia with Anberlin and William Beckett. On September 13, a music video was released for "Love & Drugs".

In October and November, the group embarked on a co-headlining US tour with Anberlin. They were supported by Lydia and From Indian Lakes. In April 2014, the group went on a tour of the UK with Deaf Havana. In May, the group embarked on a South American tour with Nick Santino. On May 21, "Ugly on the Inside" was made available for streaming. Between June and August, the group went on Warped Tour across the US. On June 8, the group released a video on the creation of the album's artwork. "So Criminal" was made available for streaming on June 14. On June 17, the band released a deluxe version of the album with five additional bonus tracks. Physical copies of this edition were sold exclusively on Warped Tour. Preceded by a teaser trailer, a music video was released for "Run" on August 11.

== Reception ==
Professional ratings
Aggregate scores
Source	Rating
Metacritic	72/100
Review scores
Source	Rating
AllMusic	3/5 stars
Alter the Press!	5/5
idobi	4.25/5
New Noise Magazine	4.5/5 stars
PopMatters	6/10

Forever Halloween has received mostly positive feedback from music critics. At Metacritic, they assign a "weighted average" rating out of 100 to selected independent ratings and reviews from mainstream critics, and the album has received a Metascore of a 72, based on 4 reviews, indicating "generally favorable reviews". Gregory Heaney of AllMusic rated the album three stars out of five, writing that the album "(Strikes) just the right balance between melancholy and wistfulness, (evoking) nostalgia without feeling overly sentimental as it takes a contemplative stroll down memory lane with a city-meets-country sound that feels inspired by the more pop-leaning moments of bands like Wilco and the Old 97's." Alternative Press remarked, "Forever Halloween continues the Maine's upward trajectory — O'Callaghan's songwriting is stronger, and the '90s alt-rock vibe they introduced on Pioneer is more prominent — but the lyrics are quite the opposite, dealing in somber, real-world situations, from the gilded gleam of the business ('Birthday in Los Angeles') to self-doubt ('Happy') and damaged relationships ('These Four Words')." Marina Oliver of idobi Radio stated, "The album boasts worldliness in comparison to The Maine's earlier catalogue, and it’s evident from the authenticity of the collection how effectively the members have channeled their experience of growing up into their work." Evan Sawdey of PopMatters said of the record, "it's a worthy album, and who knows: with the machinations in place now, they just might wind up releasing that one truly great album yet—and, as is the case these days, entirely on their own terms." Billy Ho of Sound the Sirens noted, "There's a lot of good on this album. It is easily their most composed and self-assured release to date, it's just a few steps short from becoming what would cement them as serious contenders in the pop rock field. Close, but not quite yet, but heading in the right direction."

== Commercial performance ==
The album sold over 10,000 copies in its first week debuting at number 39 on the Billboard 200, and has sold 26,000 copies as of March 2015. It also became their first charting album in the UK reaching number 15 on the UK Independent Album Breakers chart.

== Track listing ==
Standard edition
No.	Title	Length
1.	"Take What You Can Carry"	3:00
2.	"Love & Drugs"	3:30
3.	"Run"	3:39
4.	"White Walls"	4:23
5.	"Happy"	2:43
6.	"Birthday in Los Angeles"	3:17
7.	"Blood Red"	3:18
8.	"Kennedy Curse"	3:48
9.	"Sad Songs"	3:21
10.	"Fucked Up Kids"	4:35
11.	"These Four Words"	4:08
12.	"Forever Halloween"	5:26
Total length:		45:12

Deluxe Version bonus tracks
No.	Title	Length
13.	"So Criminal"	3:27
14.	"Vanilla"	4:07
15.	"Ugly on the Inside"	3:56
16.	"Bliss"	3:25
17.	"Ice Cave"	4:55
Total length:		65:02

== Personnel ==
Members

- John O'Callaghan – lead vocals, piano
- Jared Monaco – lead guitar
- Kennedy Brock – rhythm guitar, vocals
- Garrett Nickelsen – bass guitar
- Patrick Kirch – drums, percussion

Production

- Bucky Baxter – pedal steel
- Brendan Benson – producer
- Andrew Higley – pump organ
- Tim Kirch – art direction, concept, layout
- Dirk Mai – art direction, concept, photography
- The Maine – composer, primary artist
- Mike Esser – engineer, percussion
- Matthew Van Gasbeck – composer
- Mark Watrous – backing vocals
- Colby Wedgeworth – mastering, mixing

== Charts ==
2013 weekly chart performance for Forever Halloween
Chart (2013)	Peak position
UK Independent Album Breakers (OCC)	15
US Billboard 200	39
US Independent Albums (Billboard)	8
US Top Alternative Albums (Billboard)	13
US Top Rock Albums (Billboard)	16
US Indie Store Album Sales (Billboard)	9

2021 weekly chart performance for Forever Halloween
Chart (2021)	Peak position
Finnish Albums (Suomen virallinen lista)	6
