= Blame (The Maine song) =

- Acoustic version cover art

Single by The Maine

from the album The Maine
- Released: June 9, 2023
- Studio: 8123 Studios
- Genre: Pop punk
- Length: 3:10
- Label: 8123; Photo Finish
- Songwriter: John O'Callaghan
- Producer: Colby Wedgeworth

The Maine singles chronology
"Box in a Heart" (2022)	"Blame" (2023)	"How to Exit a Room" (2023)

Music video
- "Blame" on YouTube

"Blame" is a song by American rock group The Maine. The song was released on June 9, 2023 as the lead single from their ninth studio album, The Maine. The song peaked at number 25 on the US Billboard Alternative Airplay chart.

== Background ==
"Blame" is about, "navigating a new way of life introduced through the digital age." In an interview with Phoenix New Times, bassist Garrett Nickelsen stated, "The song 'Blame' talks about the feeling of what it is to be a human in this internet age and reacting to things like likes... I think it's talking about the time we're living in, specifically [O'Callaghan] having a child and what that feels like and the anxiety that can come with that joy."

== Composition ==
"Blame" was written by John O'Callaghan and was produced by Colby Wedgeworth. The song has been described as a "self-reflective song" that explores the theme of accepting responsibility for past mistakes and the desire to make amends, according to O'Callaghan. He explained the song's meaning stating, "In lieu of being too wordy, 'Blame' was written to myself from myself. This tune is more or less about both placing and accepting blame for things I wish I could redo. The only rub is I can't go backwards, only forwards." The claps featured on the song was a "happy little accident," thought of by O'Callaghan while the band was in Franklin, Tennessee, with producer Colby Wedgeworth.

== Music video ==
A music video for "Blame" was released on June 9, 2023 and was directed by Guadalupe Bustos. The video was filmed in the band's hometown of Phoenix, Arizona and was shot at The Nile Theater.

== Track listing ==
Digital download

No.	Title	Length
1.	"Blame"	3:10
2.	"How to Exit a Room"	3:44

== Personnel ==
Credits for "Blame" adapted from AllMusic.

The Maine

- John O'Callaghan – lead vocals
- Kennedy Brock – rhythm guitar
- Jared Monaco – lead guitar
- Pat Kirch – drums, percussion
- Garrett Nickelsen – bass guitar

Production

- Colby Wedgeworth – producer
- Andrew Goldstein – composer
- Randy Merrill – mastering engineer
- Doug Weier – mixing

== Charts ==
Chart performance for "Blame"
Chart (2023)	Peak position
US Alternative Airplay (Billboard)	25

== Release history ==
Release dates and formats for "Blame"
Region	Date	Format	Label	Ref.
Various	June 9, 2023	Digital download	8123	
United States	June 27, 2023	Alternative radio	Photo Finish	
