= In Darkness and in Light =

- Film poster
- Directed by: James Sullos; Mike Jones
- Screenplay by: Ian Kintzle
- Produced by: Jenna Baum; Tim Kirch
- Music by: The Maine
- Distributed by: Warner Bros.
- Release date: December 29, 2010
- Running time: 18:25
- Country: United States
- Language: English
- Budget: $100,000

In Darkness and in Light is a 2010 short film distributed by Warner Bros., scripted by Ian Kintzle, from a story by Kintzle and John O'Callaghan, and directed by Jim Sullos and Mike Jones. The film is packaged with a boxset of music from the American rock band The Maine, and is sold exclusively on iTunes.

== Background ==
The movie is geared towards young people and is about growing up and cultivating an identity. Director Jim Sullos stated, "We want young people to realize that you have to fight for what you believe in and that you should never just do something because it's what others expect of you. You have to go out there, find your own voice and forge your own path. It's too easy to walk through the tunnel that's already been dug." Singer John O'Callaghan also added, "We wanted to express our creativity through a medium other than just music." The group traded scripts with Sullos and Mike Jones for four months, before it approved for shooting. With four weeks to complete the project, it was filmed while the band was on tour, uploading footage and recording on their bus, as well as finishing post-production in that span.

== Plot ==
The film stars 25 child actors, portraying characters engaging in bloody war, which relates to the band's second studio album, Black & White. It is a tale about a small band of contumacious boys and girls that live in a hidden village on a faraway beach; they are the Ivory Rebellion, a feral group of children that are fighting from oppression against an evil queen named Johanna, and her ruthless Onyx Empire. Like Peter Pan & The Lost Boys, the rebels have shunned society and live completely free of parents and authority figures. Their existence, albeit a simple one, is entirely devoid of technology, minus simple firearms and an ancient tube radio. Surrounding their beach is a border, the land across from which is forbidden and belongs to the Onyx Empire. For the longest time a treaty was set forth, stating that no one from either side shall cross said border, but in a last-ditch effort to induct the boys and girls of the Ivory Rebellion, Queen Johanna has halted all supply shipments into their village. The rebels are running low on food, and with the threat of starvation, are forced to make a decision that could cost them everything.

== Release ==
On December 3, 2010, the band announced their debut film In Darkness & in Light, releasing a trailer for the movie in promotion. On December 8, the group announced that they would be screening the film in Tempe, Arizona, on December 17. The event also featured a documentary of the making of Black & White, screenings of their music videos and an acoustic performance from the band. It was released exclusively through iTunes on December 29.

== Track listing ==
All music is composed by The Maine

Music box set
No.	Title	Length
1.	"Untangle Me" (B-Side)	3:20
2.	"Free" (Home Recording)	3:22
3.	"Book of Me and You" (Home Recording)	3:00
4.	"Whoever She Is" (Home Recording)	4:01
5.	"Growing Up" (Live Acoustic Song)	4:03
6.	"Washroom Color"	2:26
7.	"Saving Grace" (Take 2)	4:07
8.	"In Darkness & In Light" (Movie Score)	18:11

- Tracks 5 through 7 are all acoustic/alternate renditions of songs off Black & White, while tracks 1 through 4 are also included on the European CD version of Black & White.

== Charts ==
Chart performance for In Darkness & in Light
Chart (2011)	Peak position
US Billboard 200	93
US Top Alternative Albums (Billboard)	14
US Top Rock Albums (Billboard)	19
