= ...And a Happy New Year =

EP by The Maine
- Released: December 9, 2008
- Genre: Pop punk; acoustic rock
- Length: 14:25
- Label: Fearless
- Producer: Matt Grabe

The Maine chronology
| Can't Stop Won't Stop (2008) | ...And a Happy New Year (2008) | Black & White (2010) |

...And a Happy New Year is a Christmas and third EP by American rock band The Maine. The EP was released on December 9, 2008, via Fearless Records. It was made available for streaming on their PureVolume page on December 7.

== Background and release ==
The EP was free for those that pre-ordered the deluxe edition of the band's debut album, Can't Stop Won't Stop. In addition, "Santa Stole My Girlfriend" was made available for streaming on the group's PureVolume account, while "Ho Ho Hopefully" was made available for streaming through the band's MySpace profile.

== Reception ==
Eric Schneider of AllMusic stated, "In addition to a synth-heavy cover of Wham!'s lovelorn 'Last Christmas', the Phoenix-based lads unwrap the shimmering 'Ho Ho Hopefully', and take up issues with Saint Nick on 'Santa Stole My Girlfriend'."

== Commercial performance ==
...And a Happy New Year debuted at number 195 on the US Billboard 200. The EP also reached number 20 on the US Billboard Digital Albums chart. The EP peaked at number 10 on the US Independent Albums chart.

== Track listing ==
All lyrics are written by John O'Callaghan; all music is composed by The Maine.

| No. | Title | Length |
|---|---|---|
| 1. | "Ho Ho Hopefully" (feat. Sherri DuPree) | 3:39 |
| 2. | "Santa Stole My Girlfriend" | 3:01 |
| 3. | "Mr. Winter" | 3:20 |
| 4. | "Last Christmas" (Wham! cover) | 4:25 |
| Total length: | | 14:25 |

== Personnel ==
The Maine

- John O'Callaghan – lead vocals, piano
- Jared Monaco – lead guitar
- Kennedy Brock – rhythm guitar, vocals
- Garrett Nickelsen – bass guitar
- Pat Kirch – drums, percussion

Production

- Matt Grabe – producer

== Charts ==
Chart performance for ...And a Happy New Year
| Chart (2008–09) | Peak position |
|---|---|
| US Billboard 200 | 195 |
| US Independent Albums (Billboard) | 10 |
