= Imaginary Numbers (EP) =

EP by The Maine
- Released: December 10, 2013
- Genre: Acoustic rock
- Length: 21:27
- Label: 8123
- Producer: The Maine

The Maine chronology
Forever Halloween (2013)	Imaginary Numbers (2013)	American Candy (2015)

Imaginary Numbers is the fourth EP and seventh release by American rock band The Maine. It was released on December 10, 2013. The EP peaked at number 31 on the US Independent Albums chart.

== Background and composition ==
On October 30, 2013, the group announced that they would be releasing an acoustic EP titled, Imaginary Numbers. The EP was written and produced by the band themselves. On November 5, 2013, the group released the track, "Raining in Paris". Along with the song's release, the group also announced an acoustic tour that began in January 2013. The day before the EP's release, the group premiered the song "Perfectly Out of Key". The group released a lyrics video for "Visions" on December 10, 2013.

On December 8, 2013, "The Making of Imaginary Numbers" video was uploaded on The Maine's YouTube channel.

== Critical reception ==
Professional ratings
Review scores
Source	Rating
Alternative Press	4/5 stars
Kill Your Stereo	4/5 stars

Imaginary Numbers was met with positive reviews from music critics. Scott Heisel of Alternative Press gave a positive review for the EP praising the first track "Raining in Paris" for O'Callaghan's "wistful yarn with fragile vocals over a delicate guitar-and-organ arrangement." He also called the third track "Perfectly Out of Key", "an extremely high point."

Kill Your Stereo praised the EP lyrically stating, "you'll see that the lyrics are, in fact, incredibly real, and they are an obvious reflection of whatever stage the writer was going through when writing these songs, and the result is more than just some great lyrics, it's something that is incredibly relatable as well."

Nathan Cornell of Into the Crowd magazine called the EP, "a mostly sad album, but John O'Callaghan wears the sad song very well. If you're into stripped down rock 'n' roll, you need to listen to this."

== Track listing ==
No.	Title	Length
1.	"Raining in Paris"	3:47
2.	"Room With No Windows"	3:44
3.	"Perfectly Out of Key"	3:58
4.	"Visions"	4:26
5.	"Lovely Sad"	6:52
Total length:		21:27

== Charts ==
Chart performance for Imaginary Numbers
Chart (2013)	Peak position
US Top Alternative Albums (Billboard)	23
US Independent Albums (Billboard)	31
US Top Rock Albums (Billboard)	39
