= Everything I Ask For =

Promotional single by The Maine

from the album Can't Stop Won't Stop
- A-side: "Into Your Arms"
- Released: June 10, 2008
- Genre: Neon pop-punk
- Length: 2:37
- Label: Fearless
- Songwriters: John O'Callaghan; Kennedy Brock; Patrick Kirch; Jared Monaco; Garrett Nickelsen; Matt Squire
- Producer: Squire

Music video
- "Everything I Ask For" on YouTube

"Everything I Ask For" is a song by American pop punk band The Maine. It was released on June 10, 2008, as the first promotional single from their debut studio album Can't Stop Won't Stop. The song is considered to be one of their most popular songs to date and became the group's first and only charting song on the US Billboard Bubbling Under Hot 100 chart, peaking at number 19.

== Background and release ==
"Everything I Ask For" is about "a tale of being in a relationship with someone who should be your everything, but makes you miserable." The song was written by John O'Callaghan, Kennedy Brock, Patrick Kirch, Jared Monaco, Garrett Nickelsen and Matt Squire. The track runs at 105 BPM and is in the key of A major. Squire who also produced the song, spoke about the track in an interview with Alternative Press.

"I just thought that from the EP to 'Everything I Ask For' would be a really cool progression. I thought that both their fans and also people who hadn't heard the band yet would be stoked with the song. [...] My big thing is energy, and I felt like that song has such a cool, hyper '90s vibe and that it'd be a super-engaging first track."

The song was made available for streaming on the band's MySpace page on June 3, 2008. It was later released for digital download via iTunes on June 10, 2008, as the album's first promotional single. On April 25, 2019, a vinyl edition of "Into Your Arms" was released with "Everything I Ask For" serving as the B-side.

== Critical reception ==
"Everything I Ask For" was met with generally positive reviews. Blake Solomon of AbsolutePunk.net stated that the track "buzzes to life with mid-tempo strumming and John O'Callaghan's semi-abrasive vocals." James Shotwell of Under the Gun Review remarked, "The song is constructed well... teens will eat it up because it's just dirty enough to get their parents riled up without being overly offensive." Amanda Milovich of Relentless Beats described the track as "a love ballad." She praised the song for its "high energy" and called the track, "highly nostalgic."

== Music video ==
The music video for "Everything I Ask For" premiered on MTV on November 19, 2008, and was directed by Matthew Stawski. Scenes of the video include the group "rocking and mocking models," who are strolling down the runway with "surprises and unexpected endings." The music video peaked at number 14 on the Billboard Hot Videoclip Tracks chart.

== Track listing ==
Digital download
No.	Title	Length
1.	"Everything I Ask For"	2:37

7" vinyl
No.	Title	Length
1.	"Into Your Arms"	3:59
2.	"Everything I Ask For"	2:37

== Personnel ==
Credits for "Everything I Ask For" per Can't Stop, Won't Stop booklet.

The Maine

- John O'Callaghan – lead vocals
- Kennedy Brock – rhythm guitar, backing vocals
- Patrick Kirch – drums
- Jared Monaco – lead guitar
- Garrett Nickelsen – bass guitar

Production

- Matt Squire – producer

== Charts ==
Chart performance for "Everything I Ask For"
Chart (2009)	Peak position
US Bubbling Under Hot 100 (Billboard)	19

== Release history ==
Release history for "Everything I Ask For"
Region	Date	Format	Label	Ref.
Various	June 10, 2008	Digital download	Fearless	
United States	April 25, 2019	Vinyl	Fearless	
