= Sticky (The Maine song) =

Single by The Maine

from the album XOXO: From Love and Anxiety in Real Time
- Released: March 19, 2021
- Recorded: 2020
- Genre: Pop rock
- Length: 2:58
- Label: 8123 Studios
- Songwriters: John O'Callaghan; Garrett Nickelsen; Pat Kirch; Jared Monaco; Kennedy Brock; Andrew Goldstein
- Producers: The Maine; Andrew Goldstein

The Maine singles chronology
"Broken Parts" (2019)	"Sticky" (2021)	"April 7th" (2021)

Music video
- "Sticky" on YouTube

"Sticky" is a song by the American rock group, the Maine. It is their first and lead single off their eighth studio album XOXO: From Love and Anxiety in Real Time released on March 19, 2021. As of 2022, it is their highest-charting single. The song peaked at number 16 on the Billboard Alternative Airplay chart (their first-ever single to appear on the chart) and at number 32 on the Rock Airplay chart.

== Background ==
In an interview with Billboard magazine, lead singer John O'Callaghan revealed he began working on the song in January 2020. O'Callaghan was in Los Angeles, writing songs with Andrew Goldstein, who also co-wrote the track. It was the last track written for their eighth studio album, XOXO: From Love and Anxiety in Real Time, but was the first song recorded on the album. The track runs at 105 BPM and is in the key of C major.

"It came together so naturally and organically, we didn't really overthink anything. It took us about three-and-a-half, four hours and I remember getting back into the car and listening to the demo and having the chills and feeling like, 'Wow! Did we accidentally do something really cool?'"

On June 4, 2021, they released a piano version of the song with the indie pop trio Shaed. On July 23, 2021, a remix to the song was released digitally.

== Music video ==
The music video premiered on March 19, 2021. It was directed by Angela Kohler and was filmed in Los Angeles. The music video shows colorful visual with each band member trying to get themselves out of peculiar situations with commonly sticky objects such as honey, glue, lollipops, rubber bands and tape. The visual soon comes to a close as the band look on while covered in hundreds of little white feathers.

== Track listing ==
Digital download
No.	Title	Length
1.	"Sticky"	2:58

Piano version
No.	Title	Length
1.	"Sticky" (piano version)	3:23

Remix version
No.	Title	Length
1.	"Sticky" (The Knocks remix)	2:54

== Personnel ==
Credits for "Sticky" adapted from AllMusic.

The Maine

- John O'Callaghan – lead vocals, piano, producer
- Jared Monaco – guitar
- Kennedy Brock – guitar
- Pat Kirch – drums
- Garrett Nickelsen – bass guitar

Production

- Andrew Goldstein – producer
- John O'Callaghan – producer
- Neal Avron – mixing

== Charts ==
Chart performance for "Sticky"
Chart (2021)	Peak position
US Rock & Alternative Airplay (Billboard)	32

== Release history ==
Region	Date	Format	Version	Label	Ref.
Various	March 19, 2021	Digital download	Original	8123	
Various	June 4, 2021	Digital download	Piano version	8123	
Various	July 23, 2021	Digital download	Remix version	8123	
