= Can't Stop Won't Stop (album) =

Studio album by The Maine
- Released: July 8, 2008
- Recorded: January–February 2008
- Studio: The Lair
- Genre: Pop rock; pop punk
- Length: 40:57
- Label: Fearless
- Producer: Matt Squire

The Maine chronology
| The Way We Talk (2007) | Can't Stop Won't Stop (2008) | ...And a Happy New Year (2008) |

Singles from Can't Stop Won't Stop
- 1. "Into Your Arms" Released: June 15, 2009

Can't Stop Won't Stop is the debut studio album by American rock band The Maine. It was released on July 8, 2008, through Fearless Records. The album debuted at No. 40 on the Billboard 200 and sold 12,000 copies first week.

== Background and production ==
The Maine formed in January 2007, consisting of John O'Callaghan on vocals, Kennedy Brock and Jared Monaco on guitar, Garrett Nickelsen on bass and Pat Kirch on drums. In November of that year, the group signed to independent label Fearless Records. Nickelsen called Fearless Records "a great label" and "really supportive." The following month, the group released The Way We Talk EP through the label. O'Callaghan said the EP showcased how the group was "transitioning musically," as well as demonstrating their "new attitude toward writing."

Pre-production for their debut album was held at The Swing House in Hollywood, California. In December 2007, the band announced plans to tour with Number One Gun the following month. However, by the end of December, the group had cancelled the touring plans and announced that they would record their debut album instead. Recording started on January 14, 2008 and continued into February. It was recorded when members Pat Kirch and Garrett Nickelsen were still attending high school, which Kirch had to graduate early so he could record the album. Sessions were held at The Lair in Los Angeles, California, with producer and engineer Matt Squire. The group had prepared 13 demos, which Squire took and wanted each track to have a different sound from one another. "Count 'em, One, Two, Three" was re-recorded for the album; the original version appears on the Stay Up, Get Down EP. Squire mixed "We All Roll Along", "I Must Be Dreaming", "Time to Go", "This Is the End", "Whoever She Is", "Count'Em, One, Two, Three", "Kiss and Sell", "You Left Me", and "We'll All Be..." at SOMD Studios in Beltsville, Maryland, while Chris Lord-Alge mixed "Everything I Ask For", "Girls Do What They Want", and "Into Your Arms" at Resonate Music in Burbank, California. Ted Jensen mastered the album at Sterling Sound in New York City. O'Callaghan said they went for a "poppier direction" for the album and how it was a "little more dressed-up." Despite having little experience in writing and recording the first album, guitarist Jared Monaco felt that "naivety and being young was important."

== Composition ==
The album was influenced by Americana music and has been described as pop punk and pop rock. "Everything I Ask For" is described as neon pop-punk, which Squire said "has such a cool, hyper '90s vibe." "Into Your Arms" is a piano ballad track, which has a similar opening to "Closing Time" by Semisonic. "Girls Do What They Want" was written by O'Callaghan and Monaco, prior to their show in Texas with not "much thought into what kind of a song it was going to be." The song "Kiss and Sell" was played in 3/4 time as Squire wanted the band to write a song in that time signature. Experimenting with electronic music, "You Left Me" strays away from the Americana influence and features more electronic beats. Reflecting on the album, Kirch said that variety played important role for the record, "It isn't all just right-down-the-middle pop punk. If we had done that, we wouldn't have known where to go next. There was a lot of acoustic guitar, pianos, slide guitars, and it made it so we weren't stuck in a box."

== Release ==
On May 15, 2008, Can't Stop Won't Stop was announced for release, and the album's track listing and artwork was revealed. Also in May, the group went on a US tour alongside Metro Station, Forever the Sickest Kids, The Cab and Danger Radio. "Everything I Ask For" was made available for streaming via the group's Myspace account on June 3. It was made available for download via iTunes on June 10, 2008. The song peaked at number 19 on the Billboard Bubbling Under Hot 100 chart. On June 20, "Girls Do What They Want" was made available for streaming on the band's iLike page. From late June to mid-July, the band went on the 2008 edition of Warped Tour. Can't Stop Won't Stop was released on July 8, through independent label Fearless Records. In July and August, the group supported Good Charlotte and Boys Like Girls on their Soundtrack of Your Summer tour across the US. The group re-joined Warped Tour until mid-August. They also supported The Academy Is... on a UK tour in August. In October and November, the group went on The Compromising of Integrity, Morality & Principles in Exchange for Money tour, supporting All Time Low.

On November 19, the music video for "Everything I Ask For" premiered on various MTV channels, directed by Matthew Stawski. In February and March 2009, the band supported We the Kings on their US tour, dubbed The Secret Valentine Tour. On March 10, the band released a music video for "Girls Do What They Want" through Myspace. The video, which was filmed during the group's tours with All Time Low and We the Kings, features the band in their van, playing shows, and hanging out with fans. Director Dan Fussellman said he wanted to "tell a story out of their travel experiences from head-banging thirteen hour van rides, to pre-show chants." From late March to early May, the band co-headlined the Alternative Press Tour with 3OH!3, with support from Family Force 5, Hit the Lights and A Rocket to the Moon. In late March, the band performed at the Alternative Press party at South by Southwest festival.

The band appeared at The Bamboozle festival in early May. On June 15, "Into Your Arms" was released as a radio single. From late June to mid-August, the group went on the 2009 edition of Warped Tour. A deluxe edition of Can't Stop Won't Stop was released on July 14 through iTunes. It included three bonus tracks: a Back Ted-N-Ted remix of "The Way We Talk", a cover of the Def Leppard track "Pour Some Sugar on Me" and an acoustic version of "I Must Be Dreaming", the music videos for "Everything I Ask For" and "Girls Do What They Want", as well as the documentary "In Person". On July 27, a music video was released for "Into Your Arms". The video was directed by Aaron Platt and shot at the Ontario International Airport in Ontario, California. The song won Best Video at the Ska Punk Awards. In October and November, the group supported Boys Like Girls on their tour of the US.

idobi Radio listed "Into You Arms" and "Girls Do What They Want" on their top 50 songs of 2009 list. The band re-issued a vinyl edition of Can't Stop Won't Stop on the 15th anniversary of the album's release on November 17, 2023, via Craft Recordings.

== Reception ==
Professional ratings
Review scores
| Source | Rating |
|---|---|
| AbsolutePunk | 70% |
| AllMusic | Favorable |
| Alternative Addiction | 3/5 stars |
| New Noise Magazine | 3/5 stars |
| Read Junk | 2/5 stars |

Can't Stop Won't Stop was met with mixed to positive reviews. Eric Schneider of AllMusic gave the album a positive review stating, "the ensemble excels at catchy, fast-paced pop tunes about girls and, well, more girls. Highlights include the soaring 'Everything I Ask For' and the swooning 'I Must Be Dreaming'." Blake Solomon of AbsolutePunk also gave the album a positive review. He stated, "Americans young and old will buy and enjoy this compact disc. At first they'll criticize it for being juvenile, and then they’ll realize there’s no such thing." However, Bryan Kremkau of Read Junk gave the album a negative review criticizing it for being "too generic and radio friendly." John Moore of New Noise Magazine remarked, "Lyrically, the music is pretty predictable, with the band writing mainly about girls and hanging out, but not too surprising as the members were just out of high school when they wrote and recorded the dozen songs that make up the album. Musically though, the band seem to be playing beyond their age at this point."

The album sold 12,000 copies in its first week of release. The album has sold over 100,000 copies up to date.

== Accolades ==
| Publication | Country | List | Year | Rank |
|---|---|---|---|---|
| AltSounds | United States | "Top 50 Albums of 2008" | 2008 | 35 |

== Track listing ==
All lyrics written by the Maine, all music written by the Maine, except "Count'Em, One, Two, Three" by the Maine, Ryan Osteman, and Alex Ross.

| No. | Title | Length |
|---|---|---|
| 1. | "Everything I Ask For" | 2:38 |
| 2. | "We All Roll Along" | 3:49 |
| 3. | "Girls Do What They Want" | 3:13 |
| 4. | "I Must Be Dreaming" | 2:46 |
| 5. | "Into Your Arms" | 3:59 |
| 6. | "Time to Go" | 2:55 |
| 7. | "This Is the End" | 2:54 |
| 8. | "Whoever She Is" | 3:41 |
| 9. | "Count'Em, One, Two, Three" | 2:54 |
| 10. | "Kiss and Sell" | 3:08 |
| 11. | "You Left Me" | 3:29 |
| 12. | "We'll All Be..." | 5:31 |
| Total length: | | 40:57 |

Deluxe edition bonus tracks
| No. | Title | Length |
|---|---|---|
| 13. | "The Way We Talk" (Back Ted N-Ted remix) | 4:12 |
| 14. | "Pour Some Sugar on Me" (Def Leppard cover) | 3:58 |
| 15. | "I Must Be Dreaming" (acoustic) | 3:59 |
| 16. | "Everything I Ask For" (music video) | 2:37 |
| 17. | "Girls Do What They Want" (music video) | 3:13 |
| 18. | "The Maine: In Person" (making-of feature) | 32:43 |
| Total length: | | 53:06 |

== Personnel ==
Personnel per booklet.

The Maine

- John O'Callaghan – lead vocals
- Garrett Nickelsen – bass guitar
- Pat Kirch – drums
- Kennedy Brock – guitar, backing vocals
- Jared Monaco – guitar

Production and design

- Matt Squire – producer, engineer, mixing
- Chris Lord-Alge – mixing
- Ted Jensen – mastering
- Evan Hunt – band photography
- Jimmy Richards – art direction, design

== Charts ==
Chart performance for Can't Stop Won't Stop
| Chart (2008) | Peak position |
|---|---|
| US Billboard 200 | 40 |
| US Independent Albums (Billboard) | 4 |
| US Top Rock Albums (Billboard) | 14 |
| US Top Alternative Albums (Billboard) | 11 |
