= Stay Up, Get Down =

EP by The Maine
- Released: May 8, 2007
- Genre: Pop punk
- Length: 16:03
- Label: Action Theory

The Maine chronology
Stay Up, Get Down (2007)	The Way We Talk (2007)

Stay Up, Get Down is the first EP by the band, The Maine, and was released on May 8, 2007. The EP was re-released in January 2012 as part of the band's celebrations for their fifth anniversary which includes a remix of The Town's Been Talkin' featuring Nick Santino of A Rocket To The Moon as a bonus track.

== Track listing ==
All lyrics written by John O'Callaghan, all music composed by The Maine

No.	Title	Length
1.	"Count'Em One, Two, Three"	2:48
2.	"Daisy"	2:27
3.	"Shake It"	3:02
4.	"The Town's Been Talkin'"	3:27
5.	"Undressing the Words"	2:09
6.	"Give Me Anything"	2:10
Total length:		16:03

== Personnel ==
Members

- John O'Callaghan – lead vocals, piano
- Ryan Osterman – lead guitar
- Alex Ross – rhythm guitar
- Garrett Nickelsen – bass
- Patrick Kirch – drums, percussion
