= The Postelles =

American rock band

- Origin: New York City, New York
- Genres: Indie rock, alternative rock, indie pop
- Years active: 2008–present
- Labels: +1 Records, Capitol Records
- Members: Daniel Balk; Billy Cadden; David Dargahi; John Speyer

The Postelles are four-piece rock band hailing from New York City. They formed at Columbia Grammar & Preparatory School on the Upper West Side of Manhattan. The band released their debut album, The Postelles, on June 7, 2011. It was produced by Albert Hammond Jr. of The Strokes. The album was recorded at Quad Studios and Looking Glass Studios both in New York, and mixed by John O'Mahony in the Electric Lady Studios. The album was nominated for Best Rock/Hard Rock album in the Independent Music Awards.

The band has played at Bonnaroo Music Festival, Lollapalooza, and Iceland Airwaves. They have toured with Kings of Leon, The Kooks, Vampire Weekend, Fun., Interpol and The Kills.

Their second album, ...And It Shook Me was released on April 23, 2013. Allmusic journalist Stephen Thomas Erlewine called the album "a lively, bright collection of sharp pop" and says "what impresses isn't the hooks themselves but how the Postelles craft the riffs and melodies into songs, how they retain a brightness to their punch without ever seeming saccharine, how they seem to celebrate exuberance, not detachment."

== In media ==
- The song White Night was featured in the first-season episode Happy Halloween, and the third-season episode "Not Indecent, but Not Quite Decent Enough Proposal" of Raising Hope.
