= The Way We Talk (EP) =

EP by The Maine
- Released: December 11, 2007
- Genre: Pop punk
- Length: 17:19
- Label: Fearless
- Producer: Matt Grabe

The Maine chronology
Stay Up, Get Down (2007)	The Way We Talk (2007)	Can't Stop Won't Stop (2008)

Singles from The Way We Talk
- 1. "The Way We Talk" Released: December 10, 2007

The Way We Talk is the second EP by Tempe, Arizona-based rock band The Maine. It was released on December 11, 2007 via Fearless Records and sold 50,000 copies. "The Way We Talk" is the only single released from the EP.

== Background ==
The Maine formed in January 2007, consisting of John O'Callaghan on vocals, Kennedy Brock and Jared Monaco on guitar, Garrett Nickelsen on bass and Pat Kirch on drums. In November of that year, the group signed to independent label Fearless Records and announced the release date for The Way We Talk. Speaking about the EP, O'Callaghan stated,

"The Way We Talk is a collection of songs that revolve around the theme of communication while in a relationship and how it changes as we grow up. This EP really begins to show how we are transitioning musically and demonstrates our new attitude toward writing."

== Critical reception ==
Professional ratings
Review scores
Source	Rating
AbsolutePunk	(83%)
AltSounds	(70%)

The Way We Talk was met with generally positive reviews from music critics. Carlos Ramirez of AltSounds praised songs like "Give Me Anything" and "If I Only Had the Heart" calling them an "infectious attack." He ended the review remarking, "if you are a fan of Cartel, Cute Is What We Aim For and Sherwood, The Way We Talk might just be your favorite new record."

Nathan Lint of AbsolutePunk stated, "they stepped it up – trying to put themselves as far out there as possible, trying to let people know that they might be a bunch of teenagers but they're here to work and have fun." He criticized the EP for having too many songs written about girls, hoping that the group will write about "different things."

== Track listing ==
All lyrics written by John O'Callaghan and Jared Monaco, all music composed by The Maine.

No.	Title	Length
1.	"If I Only Had the Heart"	3:31
2.	"The Way We Talk"	3:47
3.	"Give Me Anything"	3:10
4.	"We Change, We Wait"	3:24
5.	"The Town's Been Talkin'"	3:27
Total length:		17:19

iTunes bonus track

No.	Title	Length
6.	"I Wanna Love You" (Akon cover)"	3:03
Total length:		20:22

== Personnel ==
Credits for The Way We Talk adapted from AllMusic.

The Maine

- John O'Callaghan – lead vocals, piano
- Jared Monaco – lead guitar
- Kennedy Brock – rhythm guitar, backing vocals
- Garrett Nickelsen – bass
- Patrick Kirch – drums, percussion

Production

- Matt Grabe – engineer, instrumentation, mixing, producer, programming
- Brad Vance – mastering

== Charts ==
Chart performance for The Way We Talk
Chart (2007)	Peak position
US Heatseekers Albums (Billboard)	10
US Independent Albums (Billboard)	45
