= Colby Wedgeworth =

American record producer

Colby Tyler Wedgeworth (born July 27, 1985 in Sacramento, California) is an American producer of pop and alternative music based in Northern California. On October 15, 2018, Wedgeworth won the ASCAP Christian Songwriter of the Year award.

== Discography ==
(Selective)

Year	Artist	Title	Role
2011	The Maine	Pioneer - Album	producer, mixer
2014	Lincoln Brewster	Made New	writer, producer, mixer
2014	Lincoln Brewster	There Is Power	producer, mixer
2014	Hawk Nelson	Drops In The Ocean	producer, mixer
2014	Hawk Nelson	Diamonds	producer, mixer
2015	The Maine	American Candy - Album	producer, mixer
2015	Jordan Feliz	The River	writer, producer, mixer
2015	Jordan Feliz	Beloved	writer, producer, mixer
2016	Jordan Feliz	Never Too Far Gone	writer, producer, mixer
2016	Tenth Avenue North	What You Want	writer, producer, mixer
2016	Micah Tyler	Never Been A Moment	producer, mixer
2016	Micah Tyler	Different	producer, mixer
2016	Zach Williams	Old Church Choir	writer, producer, mixer
2017	Colton Dixon	All That Matters	writer, producer
2017	The Maine	Lovely Little Lonely - Album	producer, mixer
2017	Mandisa	Unfinished	writer, co-producer
2017	Brandon Heath	Whole Heart	writer, producer
2017	Jeremy Camp	Word Of Life	writer, producer
2017	Jeremy Camp	My Defender	writer, producer
2017	Tauren Wells	When We Pray	writer, co-producer
2018	Jordan Feliz	Witness	writer, producer
2018	Jordan Feliz	Changed	writer, producer
2018	Jordan Feliz	Faith	writer, producer
2019	Danny Gokey	Haven't Seen It Yet	writer, producer
2019	Danny Gokey	Love God Love People	writer, co-producer
2019	Newsboys	Greatness Of Our God	writer
2020	Jordan Feliz	Glorify	writer, co-producer
2021	Petey Martin & Lauren Daigle	Come Back Home	writer
2021	Danny Gokey	New Day	writer, co-producer
2021	Riley Clemmons	For The Good	writer, producer
2021	Jordan Feliz	Jesus Is Coming Back	writer, producer
2021	The Maine	XOXO: From Love and Anxiety in Real Time	writer, producer
2024	Newsboys	In God We Trust	writer
