= Idobi Radio =

Modern rock Internet radio station

idobi Radio
- Website type: Internet Radio
- Available in: English
- Owner: idobi Network LLC
- Website: idobi.com
- Registration: Optional
- Launched: 1999
- Current status: Active

idobi Radio (/aɪˈdoʊbi/), is an alternative Internet radio station in the United States, that plays new alternative music. Since its establishment in 1999, the station has utilized its website, app, and iTunes platform for broadcasting over the Internet. Known for its comprehensive content, idobi Radio presents a range of interviews, music coverage, and radio programs led by well-known artists. The station's stream amalgamates tracks from established alternative artists as well as emerging unsigned acts.

== History ==
idobi Radio was established in February, 1999 in Washington, DC by then MTV Networks producer Tom Cheney. The station broadcast through the Live365 radio platform in two formats: Alternative Rock and Top 40, which initially ran off Cheney's home computer. The station became more popular by promoting itself through concert tours, especially the Vans Warped Tour, and by teaming up with popular artists.

The introduction of the iTunes Internet radio directory boosted listenership even further. idobi Radio dropped the Top 40 stream in early 2003 in order to focus on the Alternative Rock stream and to launch a new website covering music news, album reviews, concert photos, and artist information. In 2003, the Live365 platform was also dropped in favor of SHOUTcast.

In 2014, idobi Radio was awarded "Best Single Stream Webcaster" at the 5th Annual RAIN internet Radio Awards at RAIN Summit Indianapolis.

Since 2014, idobi Radio has partnered with Warped Tour to create iWR – idobi Warped Radio – the official internet radio station for the festival. iWR features interviews, takeovers, and spotlights on Vans Warped Tour artists running for the duration of the summer festival's dates.

== idobi music ==
idobi Radio and its shows have played a role in breaking out bands like Good Charlotte, Simple Plan, Fall Out Boy, and many others. The station's playlist rotation is based on top alternative hits with an emphasis on new music and deep album cuts from top alternative artists.

idobi Radio also has two sister stations: Howl, launched in 2013 with a focus on metal and hardcore music; and Anthm, which plays indie rock and indie pop.

== Other media ==
idobi Radio ran a concert photography site called Photos From the Show and an online music video stream called idobiTV, up until 2013. Their concert photography and video content is now featured on the idobi website.

On April 15, 2011, the site released the idobi App, an iOS app for the iPhone, iPod Touch and iPad. On August 30, it was released for Android.
