= Clarence Adams (Korean War) =

United States Army soldier

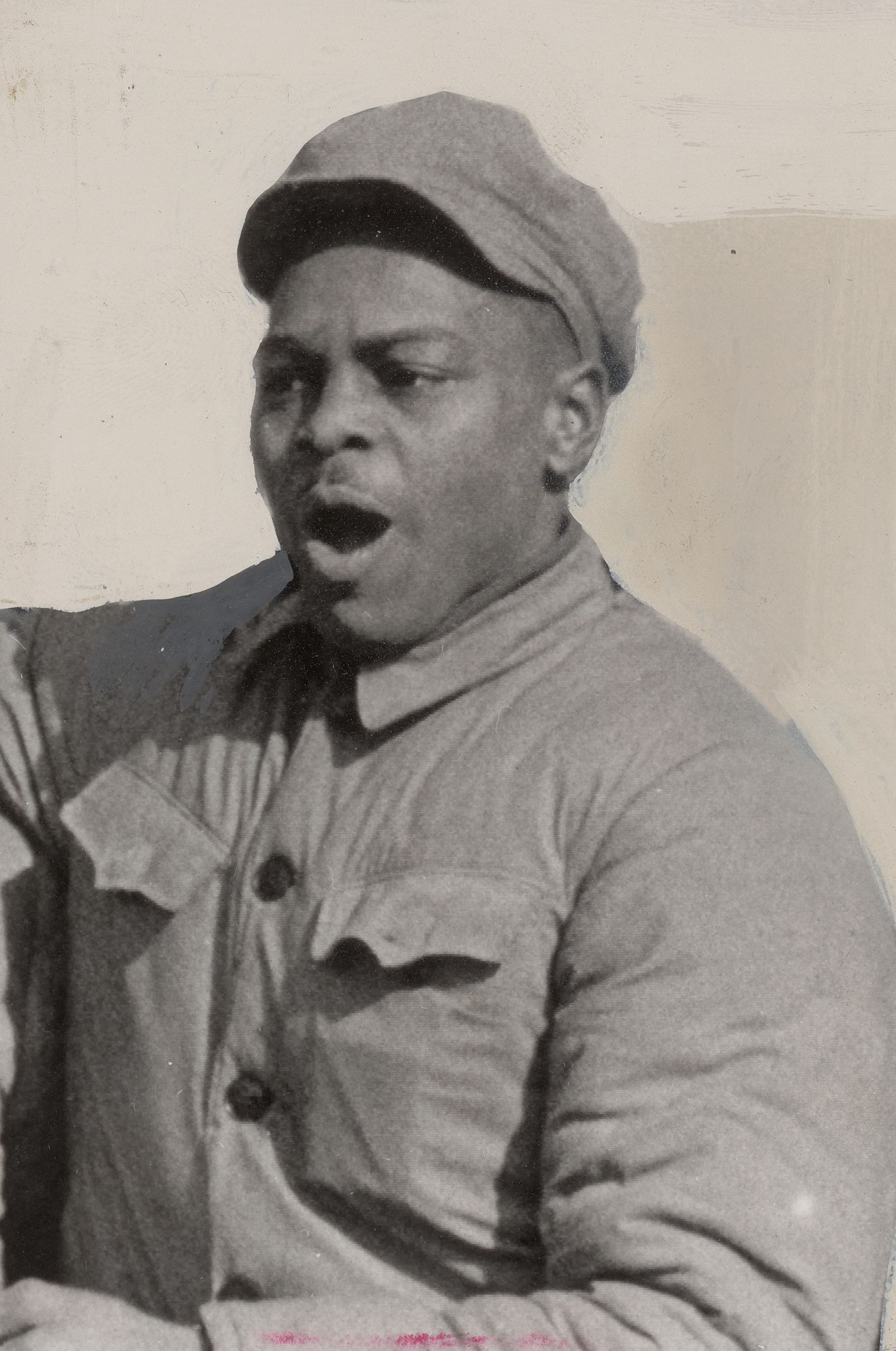
- Adams c. 1954
- Born: January 4, 1929; Memphis, Tennessee, US
- Died: September 17, 1999 (aged 70); Memphis, Tennessee, US
- Military career
- Allegiance: United States (1946–1950; 1966–1999); China (1950–1966; defector)
- Branch: United States Army
- Service years: 1946–1950
- Rank: Corporal

Clarence Adams (January 4, 1929 – September 17, 1999) was an African-American GI during the Korean War. He was captured on November 29, 1950, when the People's Liberation Army overran his all-black artillery unit's position. Adams was held as a POW until the end of the war. Instead of returning to the United States during Operation Big Switch, Adams was one of 21 American soldiers who chose to settle in the People's Republic of China. As a result of their decision, these 21 Americans were considered defectors.

== Early life ==
Adams was born on January 4, 1929, and grew up poor in Memphis, Tennessee. He dropped out of high school and joined the U.S. Army in 1946, at the age of 17.

== Korean War ==
After basic training, Adams became an infantry machine gunner. He was sent to Korea shortly after the war between North and South erupted in June 1950 and was posted to Battery A of the 503rd Artillery Regiment, attached to the 2nd Infantry Division. This was his second tour in Korea, as he had first been posted there in 1948.

After his capture by the Chinese, Adams took classes in communist political theory, and afterwards lectured other prisoners in the camps. Because of this and other collaboration with his captors, his prosecution by the Army was likely upon his repatriation. During the Vietnam War, Adams made propaganda broadcasts for Radio Hanoi from their Chinese office, telling black American soldiers not to fight:

You are supposedly fighting for the freedom of the Vietnamese, but what kind of freedom do you have at home, sitting in the back of the bus, being barred from restaurants, stores and certain neighborhoods, and being denied the right to vote. ... Go home and fight for equality in America.

Adams married a Chinese woman named Liu Lin Feng and lived in China until 1966.

== Return to the United States ==
Adams returned to the United States from China via Hong Kong on May 26, 1966, citing that he missed his mother. The House Un-American Activities Committee subpoenaed Adams upon his return but did not question him publicly. The charges raised by the committee were dropped.

He later started a Chinese restaurant business in Memphis in 1972. He ran four of them with his wife at one point.

Adams died on September 17, 1999. His autobiography An American Dream: The Life of an African American Soldier and POW Who Spent Twelve Years in Communist China was posthumously published in 2007 by his daughter Della Adams and Lewis H. Carlson.

== Military Awards and Decorations ==
During his military service, Clarence was awarded the following medals.

1st row	Prisoner of War Medal		
2nd row	World War II Victory Medal	Army of Occupation Medal with 'Japan' clasp	National Defense Service Medal
3rd row	Korean Service Medal with one campaign star	United Nations Service Medal Korea	Korean War Service Medal
Unit awards	Korean Presidential Unit Citation		

== See also ==
- List of American and British defectors in the Korean War
- Samuel David Hawkins
- Korean War
- James Veneris
