= American Dreamer =

American Dreamer or American Dreamers may refer to:

== Film and television ==
- American Dreamer (1984 film), an American film starring JoBeth Williams and Tom Conti
- American Dreamer (2018 film), an American film written and directed by Derrick Borte
- American Dreamer (2022 film), an American film starring Peter Dinklage
- American Dreamer (TV series), a 1990-1991 American television situation comedy
- "American Dreamer" (Supergirl), a season 4 episode of the TV series Supergirl
- "American Dreamers" (CSI: NY), a season 1 episode of the TV series CSI: NY

== Music ==
- American Dreamer, a 2005 album by Brain Failure
- American Dreamers: Voices of Hope, Music of Freedom, a 2018 album by the John Daversa Big Band
- American Dreamer (album), a 2021 box set of Laura Nyro reissued albums
- "American Dreamer", a song by Brooks & Dunn from their 2007 album Cowboy Town

== See also ==
- American Dream (disambiguation)
- American Dreaming (disambiguation)
