= Inside of You (The Maine song) =

Single by The Maine

from the album Black & White
- Released: May 3, 2010
- Genre: Pop rock
- Length: 3:50
- Label: Warner
- Songwriter: John O'Callaghan
- Producer: Howard Benson

The Maine singles chronology
"Into Your Arms" (2009)	"Inside of You" (2010)	"Growing Up" (2010)

Music video
- "Inside of You" on YouTube

"Inside of You" is a song by American rock band the Maine. The song was released digitally on May 3, 2010, and serviced to radio on June 14. The song was released as the lead single from their second studio album, Black & White. An acoustic version of the song was released on July 13, 2010.

== Background ==
"Inside of You" was written by lead singer John O'Callaghan and produced by Howard Benson, released through Warner Records. The song is about sex, but is a bit of a double entendre, expressing a much deeper meaning. Speaking about the material, O'Callaghan stated, "we haven't ever been interested in doing a 'scene' thing [...] we definitely wanted a vibe that was a bit more rock." The track runs at 133 BPM and is in the key of A major. The song peaked at number 14 on the US Billboard Rock Digital Song Sales chart.

In 2010, the song won the AP Magazine Readers' Awards for Best Song.

== Music video ==
The music video for "Inside of You" was released on July 19, 2010. The music video is directed by Mike Jones and Jim Sullos.

The video depicts the band leaving their black and white world behind to enter the crazy, colorful imagination of a young boy via his kaleidoscope below.

== Track listing ==
Digital download
No.	Title	Length
1.	"Inside of You"	3:50

Acoustic version
No.	Title	Length
1.	"Inside of You" (acoustic)	3:46

== Charts ==
Chart performance for "Inside of You"
Chart (2010)	Peak position
US Rock Digital Song Sales (Billboard)	14

== Release history ==
Release dates and formats for "Inside of You"
Region	Date	Format	Label	Ref.
Various	May 3, 2010	Digital download	Warner	
