= When We Were Young (festival) =

Music festival in Las Vegas

- 2022 lineup
- Genre: Emo; pop-punk; post-hardcore; alternative rock; metalcore; screamo; emo pop; hardcore punk; punk rock; indie rock; indie pop
- Dates: April 8 and 9, 2017; October 22, 23 and 29, 2022; October 21 and 22, 2023; October 19 and 20, 2024; October 18 and 19, 2025
- Locations: The Observatory, Santa Ana, California; Las Vegas Festival Grounds, Winchester, Nevada, U.S.
- Years active: 2017; 2022–2025; 2027 (upcoming)
- Founders: Live Nation Entertainment
- Website: whenwewereyoungfestival.com

When We Were Young is an annual rock music festival held at the Las Vegas Festival Grounds in Winchester, Nevada. It is typically scheduled for the third weekend of October. The most recent event took place from October 18-19, 2025.

== History ==
The first incarnation of the festival took place at The Observatory in Santa Ana, California on April 8 and 9, 2017. It was headlined by Morrissey.

In 2022, the festival was moved to Winchester, Nevada at the Las Vegas Festival Grounds. The event was first announced on January 18, 2022, as a one-day event on October 22, 2022, headlined by My Chemical Romance and Paramore. Tickets sold out quickly, leading to the addition of second and third dates on October 23 and 29, 2022. Matt Skiba of Alkaline Trio asserted that the festival lineup was announced before bands were committed but that all bands agreed to play. The first day was canceled due to weather. The band Car Seat Headrest was scheduled to play as part of the 2022 lineup but pulled out due to health issues.

On October 11, 2022, the festival announced it was returning for a second year in 2023, with Blink-182 and Green Day as headliners. The event also moved from a three-day festival to a two-day weekend festival, a format that was also used for the 2024 festival.

On November 13, 2023, after a lineup was leaked, all artists officially announced the lineup for 2024, set to be headlined by Fall Out Boy and My Chemical Romance. In 2024, nearly all of the performing bands were set to play sets that consist of one of their albums played in its entirety. The All-American Rejects dropped out a week before the festival; lead singer Tyson Ritter said that the band never agreed to play their self-titled debut album in full despite it being advertised as such, and wanted to play a "greatest hits" set instead. The festival was criticized for misspelling eight band names across its official merchandise items.

On October 29, 2024, the 2025 edition was announced, with Blink-182 returning to headline alongside Panic! at the Disco, marking the latter's first one-off reunion following their 2023 dissolution and in honor of the 20th anniversary of their album A Fever You Can't Sweat Out, which was performed in full. The event took place on October 18 and 19, 2025.

In February 2026, event organizers revealed the festival would not take place that year. They subsequently announced it would return in October 2027.

The festival will be returning on October 16, 2027. This edition of the festival includes Blink-182 and Pierce the Veil as headliners.

== Lineups ==
List of official festival lineup in alphabetical order by year; headliners in bold:

2017
- AFI
- Agent Orange
- Alkaline Trio
- Balance and Composure
- Beach Fossils
- The Buttertones
- Cage the Elephant
- Cat Signs
- CH3
- Choking Victim
- David Bazan
- Descendents
- The Dickies
- Dr. Dog
- Fidlar
- Foxygen
- The Frights
- The Get Up Kids
- Guttermouth
- Homeshake
- Joyce Manor
- Mike Watt
- Mount Eerie
- **Morrissey**
- Moving Units
- No Parents
- Pinback
- Plague Vendor
- The Regrettes
- Sadgirl
- Saves the Day
- Senses Fail
- Set Your Goals
- Sheer Mag
- Silversun Pickups
- The Stitches
- Streetlight Manifesto
- Sunflower Bean
- Taking Back Sunday
- Tijuana Panthers
- Together Pangea
- Turnstile

2022
- 3OH!3
- Acceptance
- AFI
- Alex G (weekend 2 only)
- Alkaline Trio
- The All-American Rejects
- Anberlin
- Armor for Sleep
- Atreyu
- Avril Lavigne (weekend 1 only)
- Bayside
- Black Veil Brides
- Boys Like Girls
- Bright Eyes
- Bring Me the Horizon
- Dance Gavin Dance
- Dashboard Confessional
- A Day to Remember
- Death Cab for Cutie (weekend 2 only)
- Four Year Strong
- The Garden
- Glassjaw
- Hawthorne Heights
- HorrorPops
- Huddy
- I Prevail
- Ice Nine Kills
- Jimmy Eat World
- Jxdn
- Kittie
- Knocked Loose
- La Dispute (weekend 1 only)
- Landon Barker
- The Linda Lindas
- The Maine
- Manchester Orchestra
- Mayday Parade
- Meet Me @ the Altar
- Mom Jeans
- Motionless in White
- **My Chemical Romance**
- Neck Deep
- Nessa Barrett
- **Paramore**
- Palaye Royale
- Prentiss
- Pierce the Veil
- Poppy
- Pvris
- The Ready Set
- The Red Jumpsuit Apparatus
- Royal & the Serpent
- Saosin
- Senses Fail
- Silverstein
- Sleeping With Sirens
- The Starting Line
- State Champs
- Story of the Year
- The Story So Far
- Taking Back Sunday
- Thursday
- TV Girl
- Underoath (weekend 2 only)
- The Used
- We the Kings
- Wolf Alice (weekend 1 only)
- The Wonder Years

2023
- 5 Seconds of Summer
- The Academy Is...
- AJJ
- All Time Low
- The Ataris
- Beach Bunny
- **Blink-182**
- Bowling for Soup
- Citizen
- Ekkstacy
- Fenix TX
- Finch
- The Front Bottoms
- Games We Play
- Goldfinger
- Good Charlotte
- **Green Day**
- Gym Class Heroes
- Hot Mulligan
- Jean Dawson
- Joyce Manor
- Jxdn
- KennyHoopla
- Knuckle Puck
- Less Than Jake
- Lit
- Magnolia Park
- Michelle Branch
- Motion City Soundtrack
- Movements
- The Movielife
- MxPx
- New Found Glory
- No Pressure
- Now More Than Ever
- The Offspring
- Pierce the Veil
- Plain White T's
- Relient K
- Rise Against
- Saves The Day
- Say Anything
- Set It Off
- Simple Plan
- Something Corporate
- Sum 41
- Thirty Seconds to Mars
- Thrice
- Tigers Jaw
- Turnover
- The Veronicas
- Waterparks
- The Wrecks
- Yellowcard
- Zebrahead

2024
- 3OH!3 (Performing Want in its entirety)
- A Day to Remember (performing Homesick in its entirety)
- Against the Current (performing Gravity in its entirety)
- Alesana (performing The Emptiness in its entirety)
- Anberlin (performing Never Take Friendship Personal in its entirety)
- Armor for Sleep (performing What to Do When You Are Dead in its entirety)
- Atreyu (performing The Curse in its entirety)
- August Burns Red (performing Constellations in its entirety)
- Basement (performing Colormeinkindness in its entirety)
- Bayside (performing their self-titled album in its entirety)
- Boys Like Girls (Subsequent addition after The All-American Rejects dropped off from the festival)
- Carr (Note: This act did not perform an album in its entirety as part of the festival, and instead performed a general set of their material.)
- Cartel (performing Chroma in its entirety)
- Chiodos (performing All's Well That Ends Well in its entirety)
- Cobra Starship (performing ¡Viva la Cobra! in its entirety)
- Coheed and Cambria (performing Good Apollo, I'm Burning Star IV, Volume One: From Fear Through the Eyes of Madness in its entirety)
- Daisy Grenade
- Dance Gavin Dance (performing Mothership in its entirety)
- Dashboard Confessional (performing Dusk and Summer in its entirety)
- Emery (performing The Weak's End in its entirety)
- Escape the Fate (performing This War is Ours in its entirety)
- **Fall Out Boy**
- Four Year Strong (performing Enemy of the World in its entirety)
- Hawthorne Heights (performing The Silence in Black and White in its entirety)
- Hey Monday (performing Hold On Tight in its entirety)
- Jimmy Eat World (performing Bleed American in its entirety)
- L.S. Dunes
- Mayday Parade (performing A Lesson in Romantics in its entirety)
- Millionaires (performing Cash Only in its entirety)
- Mom Jeans (performing Best Buds in its entirety)
- Motion City Soundtrack (performing Commit This to Memory in its entirety)
- Movements (performing Feel Something in its entirety)
- **My Chemical Romance** (performing The Black Parade in its entirety)
- Nada Surf (performing Let Go in its entirety)
- Neck Deep (performing Life's Not Out to Get You in its entirety)
- New Found Glory (performing Sticks and Stones in its entirety)
- Pierce the Veil (performing Collide with the Sky in its entirety)
- Pretty Girls Make Graves (performing The New Romance in its entirety)
- Saosin (performing their self-titled album in its entirety)
- Saves the Day (performing Stay What You Are in its entirety)
- Say Anything (performing ...Is a Real Boy in its entirety)
- Senses Fail (performing Still Searching in its entirety)
- Silverstein (performing Discovering the Waterfront in its entirety)
- Simple Plan (performing No Pads, No Helmets...Just Balls in its entirety)
- Sleeping with Sirens (performing Let's Cheers to This in its entirety)
- State Champs (performing The Finer Things in its entirety)
- Story of the Year (performing Page Avenue in its entirety)
- Taking Back Sunday (performing Tell All Your Friends in its entirety)
- The Devil Wears Prada (performing Plagues in its entirety)
- The Forecast (performing In the Shadow of Two Gunmen in its entirety)
- The Maine (performing Can't Stop Won't Stop in its entirety)
- The Paradox (Last minute addition)
- The Red Jumpsuit Apparatus (performing Don't You Fake It in its entirety)
- The Starting Line (performing Say It Like You Mean It in its entirety)
- The Used (performing In Love and Death in its entirety)
- The Wonder Years (performing The Greatest Generation in its entirety)
- Thursday (performing Full Collapse in its entirety)
- Tonight Alive (performing The Other Side in its entirety)
- Underoath (performing They're Only Chasing Safety in its entirety)
- We Are the In Crowd (performing Weird Kids in its entirety)
- We the Kings (performing their self titled-debut in its entirety)

2025
- Alexisonfire
- All Time Low
- Arm's Length
- Asking Alexandria
- Avril Lavigne
- Bad Religion
- Beartooth
- **Blink-182**
- Boys Like Girls
- Breathe Carolina
- Chiodos
- Crown the Empire
- Destroy Boys
- Don Broco
- Drain
- Her Leather Jacket
- Holding Absence
- I Prevail
- Ice Nine Kills
- Jack’s Mannequin
- Knocked Loose
- Kublai Khan Tx
- Letlive
- Loathe
- Mayday Parade
- Motionless In White
- **Panic! at the Disco** (performing A Fever You Can't Sweat Out in its entirety)
- Plain White T's
- Pvris
- Set Your Goals
- Simple Plan
- Story of the Year
- Straylight Run
- Sunami
- Taking Back Sunday
- Taylor Acorn
- The Amity Affliction
- The Cab
- The Gaslight Anthem
- The Maine
- The Movielife
- The Offspring
- The Plot In You
- The Red Jumpsuit Apparatus
- The Rocket Summer
- The Starting Line
- The Story So Far
- The Summer Set
- The Used
- We Came As Romans
- We the Kings
- Weezer
- Yellowcard

== See also ==
- Sick New World
- Vans Warped Tour
- Taste of Chaos
- The Bamboozle
- Furnace Fest
- Honda Civic Tour
- Slam Dunk Festival
- Riot Fest
