= Quiet Part Loud (song) =

Single by The Maine

from the album Joy Next Door
- Released: February 25, 2026
- Studio: 8123 Studios
- Genre: Indie rock; pop rock
- Length: 3:08
- Label: 8123; Photo Finish
- Songwriter: John O'Callaghan
- Producers: O'Callaghan; Sean Silverman

The Maine singles chronology
"Die to Fall" (2026)	"Quiet Part Loud" (2026)	"Palms" (2026)

Music video
- "Quiet Part Loud" on YouTube

"Quiet Part Loud" is a song by American rock band The Maine. The song was released on February 25, 2026, as the second single from their tenth studio album, Joy Next Door. Written and produced by John O'Callaghan, a music video was released in promotion of the single.

Described as an indie rock and pop rock track, it was met with praise from music critics, highlighting the vocals and production on the song.

== Background ==
According to singer John O'Callaghan, the song was put together quickly "out of necessity." Lead guitarist Jared Monaco pointed out how the band didn't have to do much to put it together as a result. Selected as the second single from Joy Next Door, drummer Pat Kirch said it was done to "show people that the album was not going to all be the same and not all be so in-your-face." He also said the song was to show how much "depth" the album has.

Bassist Garrett Nickelsen stated that "Quiet Part Loud" was his favorite song to perform, describing the set up as "interesting." He further elaborated, "It's this weird, cool dynamic where I zone out into just us playing, almost like a rehearsal. It's this weird tunnel vision."

== Composition ==
"Quiet Part Loud" was written by John O'Callaghan and produced by Sean Silverman. He was heading to Los Angeles to write songs when he thought of an idea for "Quiet Part Loud". He came up with a piano part when he was in Phoenix, before arriving to Los Angeles and brought up the idea to Silverman. According to Monaco, when he heard the demo, it "immediately" stuck out to him.

The track is described as indie rock and pop rock. Nickelsen stated that the band wanted "to have a climactic ending," describing its outro as "some sort of exploding-type thing at the end to bring some extra energy." Musically, the song focuses on vocals and the piano, while "not overdoing it" with the other instruments, according to Kirch. He also mentioned how his drum parts "sounds like it's a loop," but wasn't.

== Critical reception ==
Adam Grundy of Chorus.fm praised O'Callaghan's vocals on the song, stating "it comes through the speakers with a warmness and glow behind the words that make the listener feel like everything is going be alright." Angelos Andreosopoulos of Earmilk said that the song "commands attention immediately with rock-solid production and confident vocals that create a surprisingly comforting atmosphere despite the sonic intensity [...] beautiful string arrangements provide the foundation for what's shaping up as another landmark moment for the alternative scene." Dusty Hayes of Music Scene Media remarked, "It's one of those songs that takes its time, coming at you in gentle bursts until finally in the last minute it hits you like a hurricane and blows you right down."

== Music video ==
A music video for "Quiet Part Loud" was released on February 25, 2026, and was directed by Guadalupe Bustos. It was shot in Phoenix, Arizona, and follows O'Callaghan taking in the view of the city.

== Track listing ==
Digital download
No.	Title	Length
1.	"Quiet Part Loud"	3:08
2.	"Die to Fall"	3:20

== Personnel ==
Credits for "Quiet Part Loud" adapted from the album's liner notes.

The Maine

- John O'Callaghan – vocals, composer, lyricist, guitar, keyboard
- Kennedy Brock – rhythm guitar, backing vocals, composer, lyricist
- Jared Monaco – lead guitar, composer, lyricist
- Garrett Nickelsen – bass guitar, composer, lyricist
- Pat Kirch – drums, percussion, composer, lyricist

Additional musicians

- Sean Silverman – composer
- Kevin Fisher – composer

Additional personnel

- John O'Callaghan – producer
- Sean Silverman – producer
- Alex Silverman – recording engineer
- Randy Merrill – mastering
- Doug Weier – mixing

== Release history ==
Release dates and formats for "Quiet Part Loud"
Region	Date	Format	Label	Ref.
Various	February 25, 2026	Digital download; streaming	8123	
