= Veneris =

Veneris is the Latin genitive of "Venus". It may refer to:

- Venus, a planet
- Venus (mythology), a goddess
- Mons pubis, also called the mons veneris
- James Veneris, American defector
