= An American Dream =

An American Dream may refer to:

- An American Dream (novel), a 1965 novel by Norman Mailer
- An American Dream (film), a 1966 drama film based on the novel
- Norman Rockwell's World... An American Dream, a 1972 short documentary film
- An American Dream (album), a 1979 album by the Nitty Gritty Dirt Band
  - "An American Dream" (song), the album's title track, also recorded by Rodney Crowell
- "An American Dream", a song by Love and Rockets from the album Express, 1986
- "An American Dream", a song by Brandon Flowers from the album Thrasher, 2026
- An American Dream (memoir), a posthumous memoir by Clarence Adams
- Trump: An American Dream, a 2017 British television documentary series

== See also ==
- American Dream (disambiguation)
