= Rocky Loves Emily =

American pop rock band

- Origin: Sterling Heights, Michigan, U.S.
- Genres: Indie rock, pop rock
- Years active: 2008–present
- Label: Tooth & Nail
- Members: Brandon Ellis; Pete Kalinowski; Andrew Stevens; Stephen Hull
- Past members: Wood Simmons; Sean Kendall; Ryan Ellis
- Website: www.myspace.com/rockylovesemily

Rocky Loves Emily is an American pop rock band formed in Sterling Heights, Michigan in 2008. As of mid-2012, their lineup consists of vocalist Brandon Ellis, drummer Pete Kalinowski, guitarists Sean Kick and Andrew Stevens, and bassist Stephen Hull. They released an independent EP, The What What What EP, before signing to Tooth & Nail Records and releasing a second EP, American Dream EP, produced by Casey Bates, and a debut full-length, Secrets Don't Make Friends, which was produced by Matt Grabe and released on April 24, 2012.

== Band history ==
=== Formation and first EP (2008–2010) ===
Lead Singer Brandon Ellis and Drummer Peter Kalinowski co-founded Rocky Loves Emily. They knew of each other in the local music scene but met for the first time while on tour with different bands at a show somewhere in Minnesota. They kept in contact, and when their former bands broke up they started Rocky Loves Emily. One day Pete Kalinowski, Stephen Hull, and Brandon Ellis had lunch together discussing band names. Pete Kalinowski and Steve Hull came up with the band name. "We were talking about old 90's movies that we remembered watching as kids. I remember Steve saying, did you guys ever see 3 ninjas, I immediately started chanting Rocky Loves Emily and paused and said that's it! That's our band name!" -Peter Kalinowski. Taking their name from a line in the 1992 film 3 Ninjas. A debut EP entitled What What What was released to iTunes in July of that year. The band spent the next several months touring, most notably playing acoustic shows at Hot Topic stores, and was a finalist in Alternative Press's January 2010 "Hometown Heroes" competition.

=== Signing and American Dream EP (2010–2011) ===
In 2010, on a day off in Seattle they attended Copeland's Farewell Tour, the band encountered an A&R executive from Tooth & Nail Records and ended up giving him a copy of their EP. This resulted in a phone call a month later and the band's subsequent signing to the label. The band then recorded several demos over the summer before being flown to Seattle to record their second EP, American Dream, with producer Casey Bates. The signing was officially announced in October, and the EP itself was released on November 22, preceded by the single "Clueless". Soon after the band toured heavily being gone more than half of the year on self-booked tours.

=== Secrets Don't Make Friends (2011–present) ===
The band performed at the 2011 SXSW Music Festival as part of a Tooth & Nail showcase that also included Emery, The Almost, Sainthood Reps, Swimming with Dolphins, and Young London. Following this and a tour with Freshman 15, Brandon Ellis announced that the band was in the process of writing their first full-length album for Tooth & Nail, stating that it would be "a step in a new direction for us as a band...I feel a lot of growing up has happened in the past year and that will definitely be expressed in the new music. Bottom line, I cannot wait for people to hear this, I've never been more excited about music in my life." A music video for the title track was released on March 14. Following that, a second SXSW appearance as part of an HM Magazine showcase, and three more singles (one of which was given an exclusive release by AbsolutePunk), the album, Secrets Don't Make Friends, was released on April 24, 2012.

Also in April 2012, the band toured with Sandlot Heroes and The New Amsterdams. Then toured with For The Foxes for a month and Joined up with Phone Calls From Home for a month and then Later in the year, they joined Sparks the Rescue's "Surrender Your Booty" tour and closed out the summer touring with Allstar Weekend and Honor Society.

After a break/hiatus the band decided to work on a second full-length record. The album, titled Miserable Love, was released on June 22, 2016.

== Musical style and influences ==
Rocky Loves Emily has most commonly been identified as pop rock, with comparisons including The Maine, Hit the Lights, The Morning Light, Jack's Mannequin, and All Time Low. Matt Collar of AllMusic described Secrets Don't Make Friends as containing "power pop-influenced rock tunes" and a delivery that matched the band's "emo-pop aesthetic". Drummer Pete Kalinowski has defined the band's sound as "pop, rock, with just a pinch of country/classic rock." He also revealed that the band originally started with a "weird grungy/indie sound" before settling into pop, admitting that they "didn't really know what we were trying to go for" at the time.

=== Influences ===
Brandon Ellis has said that his songwriting is influenced by Tom Petty and Bryan Adams: "I really like the songwriting structures...the way their guitar riffs and vocals fit together. I think they set the tone for a lot of bands today whether [those] bands realize it or not." Kalinowski lists Kiss, Foo Fighters, Neil Young, Soundgarden, and Def Leppard among his personal influences.

Ellis has also noted the influence of the band's collective Christian faith: "I do think that because I’m a Christian and we’re all Christians, regardless of whether we try not to make our music Christian...it just bleeds through because it’s who we are. I feel like it’s going to happen regardless of what I try to set out to do because God’s in me. I think it is in there, but you just have to look for it."

== Members ==
- Brandon Ellis - vocals
- Pete Kalinowski - drums
- Andrew Stevens - guitar

Former

- Ryan Ellis - bass guitar (2008–2009)
- Sean Kendall - guitar (2009)
- Wood Simmons - bass guitar (2009–2011)
- Stephen Hull - bass guitar/keyboards

== Discography ==
=== What What What EP ===
The What What What EP

EP by Rocky Loves Emily
- Released: July 21, 2009
- Genres: Indie rock, pop punk

Rocky Loves Emily chronology
The What What What EP (2009)	American Dream EP (2010)

The What What What EP is the debut EP by Rocky Loves Emily, and the band's first official recording. It was released independently through iTunes on July 21, 2009. The song "Name of the Game" was reused for the band's follow-up EP, American Dream.

==== Track listing ====
1. "Getaway"
2. "Engines to Coast"
3. "Name of the Game"
4. "What Makes This So Hot"
5. "Cali 'N' Monica"

==== Personnel ====
- Brandon James Ellis - vocals
- Ryan Ellis - Bass
- Pete Kalinowski - drums
- Sean Kick - guitar
- Andrew Stevens - guitar

=== With Tooth & Nail ===
- American Dream EP (2010)
- Secrets Don't Make Friends (2012)

=== Independent ===
- Miserable Love (2016)
