= Into Your Arms (The Maine song) =

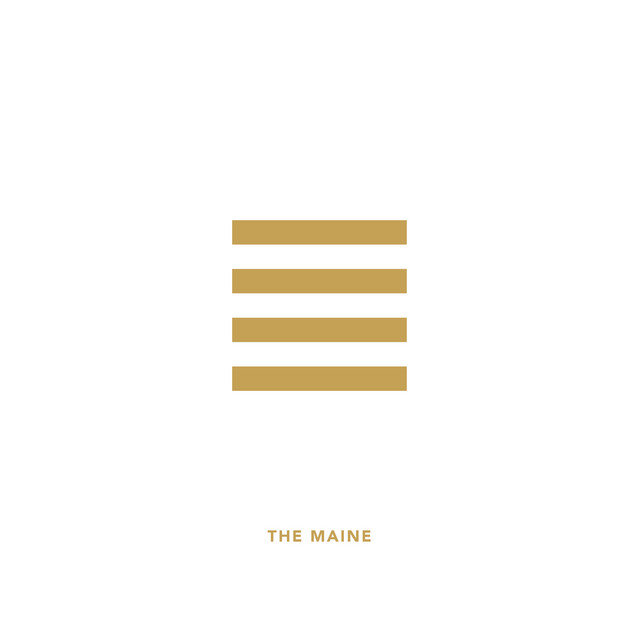

Single by The Maine

from the album Can't Stop Won't Stop
- B-side: "Everything I Ask For"
- Released: June 15, 2009
- Genre: Pop rock
- Length: 3:59
- Label: Fearless
- Songwriters: Kennedy Brock; Pat Kirch; Jared Monaco; Garrett Nickelsen; John O'Callaghan
- Producer: Matt Squire

The Maine singles chronology
| "The Way We Talk" (2007) | "Into Your Arms" (2009) | "Inside of You" (2010) |

Music video
- "Into Your Arms" on YouTube

"Into Your Arms" is a song by American rock band The Maine. It was released on June 15, 2009, as the lead single from their debut studio album Can't Stop Won't Stop. A music video was released on July 24, 2009, in promotion of the single.

== Background and release ==
Speaking about the song in retrospect, lead singer John O'Callaghan stated:

"'Into Your Arms' represents many things for me now on more than just a song-specific level. It represents the innocence of our band at the time and the wide-eyed optimism we all shared about our musical future. It represents why we started playing together in the first place... music is fun."

The band re-released an acoustic version of the song on their 2018 compilation album, Less Noise: A Collection of Songs by a Band Called The Maine. On April 25, 2019, the group released a vinyl edition of the song with "Everything I Ask For" serving as the B-side for the single.

== Composition ==
"Into Your Arms" was written by Kennedy Brock, Pat Kirch, Jared Monaco, Garrett Nickelsen and John O'Callaghan while production was handled by Matt Squire. The track runs at 180 BPM and is in the key of G major. O'Callaghan recorded a demo of the song on GarageBand and was written in O'Callaghan's parents house, as revealed by drummer Pat Kirch on the 10th anniversary of Can't Stop, Won't Stop.

== Critical reception ==
Blake Solomon of AbsolutePunk.net compared the track to Semisonic's, "Closing Time". James Shotwell of Under the Gun Review stated that the song is, "a heavy ballad with some gorgeous, yet simple piano work. John’s vocals are clean and wonderful, as is the simple acoustic work during the verses."

== Music video ==
The band filmed the video for "Into Your Arms" on May 19, 2009, at the Ontario International Airport in Ontario, California. The music video premiered on July 24, 2009, via their MySpace page and was directed by Aaron Platt. The video features actress Melissa Stetten as O'Callaghan's love interest. The video has been compared to David Cook's music video for his song "Come Back to Me", for sharing similar visuals such as being set in an airport and how the video runs backwards.

On June 18, 2009, the band launched a music video contest letting fans create their own video-version of the song with the three videos with the most views winning a variety of prizes. "Into Your Arms" won Best Video at the 2010 Arizona Ska Punk Awards.

== Awards and nominations ==
Awards and nominations for "Into Your Arms"
| Year | Organization | Award | Result | Ref(s) |
|---|---|---|---|---|
| 2010 | Ska Punk Awards | Best Video | Won | |

=== Accolades ===
Accolades for "Into Your Arms"
| Publication | Country | Accolade | Year | Rank | Ref. |
|---|---|---|---|---|---|
| idobi Radio | United States | Top 50 Songs of 2009 | 2009 | 42 | |

== Track listing ==
CD single
| No. | Title | Length |
|---|---|---|
| 1. | "Into Your Arms" | 3:59 |

7" vinyl/digital download
| No. | Title | Length |
|---|---|---|
| 1. | "Into Your Arms" | 3:59 |
| 2. | "Everything I Ask For" | 2:37 |

== Personnel ==
Credits for "Into Your Arms" per Can't Stop, Won't Stop booklet.

The Maine

- John O'Callaghan – lead vocals, piano
- Kennedy Brock – rhythm guitar, backing vocals
- Pat Kirch – drums
- Jared Monaco – lead guitar
- Garrett Nickelsen – bass guitar

Production

- Matt Squire – producer

== Release history ==
Release dates and formats for "Into Your Arms"
| Region | Date | Format | Label | Ref. |
|---|---|---|---|---|
| United States | June 15, 2009 | Contemporary hit radio | Fearless | |
| United States | January 11, 2010 | CD | Warner Bros. | |
| Various | April 25, 2019 | Vinyl | Fearless | |
