= An American Dream (memoir) =

2007 memoir by Clarence Adams

An American Dream: The Life of an African American Soldier and POW Who Spent Twelve Years in Communist China
- Cover of first edition (paperback)
- Author: Clarence Adams
- Language: English
- Genre: Memoir
- Published: June 6, 2007 (University of Massachusetts Press)
- Publication place: United States
- Media type: Print (Paperback)
- Pages: 155 pp
- ISBN: 978-1-55849-595-1 (first edition, paperback)
- OCLC: 81252783

An American Dream: The Life of an African American Soldier and POW Who Spent Twelve Years in Communist China is a memoir by Corporal Clarence Adams posthumously published by the University of Massachusetts Press and edited by Della Adams and Louis H. Carlson.

== Summary ==
Adams was one of 21 Americans who refused repatriation to the United States in favor of going to China after being a POW during the Korean War. The book follows Adams's youth in Memphis, Tennessee, through his time in the Korean War as a POW and his return to Memphis with his Chinese wife and children. It deals heavily with race relations in the South in both the 1930s and 1940s of Adams's youth and following his return to the US in 1966 during the Civil Rights Movement, as well as the red scare of the Cold War. Throughout the book, Adams cites racism, lack of opportunity, and curiosity as his main reasons for defecting and maintained his right to do so despite investigations into and questioning of his activities in China by the FBI.

== See also ==
- Samuel David Hawkins
- James Veneris

Five other American servicemen are known to have defected to North Korea after the war. They are:

- Jerry Wayne Parrish
- Charles Robert Jenkins
- James Joseph Dresnok
- Larry Allen Abshier
- Joseph White
