= American Dream (disambiguation) =

The American Dream is a national ethos of the United States in which freedom includes a promise of the possibility of prosperity and success.

American Dream and American Dreams or American Dreamz may also refer to:

== Arts, entertainment, and media ==
=== Film and stage ===
- The American Dream (play), a 1960 play by Edward Albee
- American Dream (film), a 1990 documentary
- The American Dream (film), a 2022 Indian film
- American Dreamz, a 2006 film

=== Music ===
- The American Dream (band), a Philadelphia-based band

==== Albums and EPs ====
- American Dream (21 Savage album) (2024)
- American Dream (Crosby, Stills, Nash & Young album) (1988)
- American Dream (LCD Soundsystem album) (2017)
- The American Dream (Emitt Rhodes album) (1971)
- The American Dream (Trophy Eyes album) (2018)
- American Dreams (Charlie Haden album) (2002)
- American Dreams (The Oak Ridge Boys album) (1989)
- American Dream (Rocky Loves Emily EP)
- American Dream (Woe, Is Me EP)
- The American Dream (Allstar Weekend EP)
- The American Dream (Mike Jones EP)
- The American Dream a 1970 album by The American Dream
- The American Dream, a 2008 EP by Walls of Jericho

==== Songs ====
- "The American Dream" (song), a 1982 song by Hank Williams, Jr.
- "American Dream" (Crosby, Stills, Nash & Young song) (1988)
- "American Dream" (Jakatta song) (2000)
- "American Dream" (Casting Crowns song) (2003)
- "American Dream" (MKTO song) (2014)
- "American Dreams" (song), a 2017 song by Papa Roach
- "American Dream", a song by Bad Religion from How Could Hell Be Any Worse?
- "American Dream", a song by Cold from Superfiction
- "American Dream", a song by LCD Soundsystem from American Dream
- "American Dream", a song by Silverstein from A Shipwreck in the Sand
- "American Dream", a song by Chris Spedding from Enemy Within
- "American Dream", a song by Switchfoot from Oh! Gravity.
- "The American Dream", a song by Afroman from Because I Got High
- "The American Dream", a song by Memphis May Fire from Remade in Misery
- "The American Dream", a song from the musical Miss Saigon
- "The American Dream", a song by Chicago from Chicago 14
- "American Dreams", a song by Flobots from Noenemies

=== Television ===
- American Dream (TV series), a 1981 American TV series
- American Dreams, a 2002–2005 American TV series
- "The American Dream" (Shameless), an episode of the American TV series Shameless
- Hell's Kitchen: The American Dream, the subtitle of the 22nd season of Fox's culinary reality competition Hell's Kitchen

=== Other uses in arts, entertainment, and media ===
- American Dream (character), a Marvel Comics superhero character
- American Dreams, a fictional baseball team in Baseball Stars
- American Dream: The Business Management Simulation, a 1985 video game

== Brands and enterprises ==
- American Dream (shopping mall), a shopping mall in East Rutherford, New Jersey
- American Dream Miami, a proposed shopping mall in Miami-Dade County, Florida

== Other uses ==
- "The American Dream" Dusty Rhodes (1945-2015), wrestler
- American Dream Downpayment Assistance Act
- The American Dream, a limousine built by Jay Ohrberg

== See also ==
- Americone Dream, a flavor of Ben & Jerry's Ice Cream
- American Dreamer (disambiguation)
- American Dreaming (disambiguation)
- An American Dream (disambiguation)
