= Right Girl =

Promotional single by The Maine

from the album Black & White
- Released: July 12, 2010
- Genre: Pop
- Length: 3:37
- Label: Warner
- Songwriters: Butch Walker; John O'Callaghan; Kennedy Brock; Patrick Kirch; Jared Monaco; Garrett Nickelsen
- Producer: Howard Benson

"Right Girl" is a song by an American pop punk band The Maine. The song premiered on July 8, 2010, before it was officially released on July 12, 2010, as the first promotional single from their second studio album, Black & White.

== Background and composition ==
"Right Girl" was written by Butch Walker, John O'Callaghan, Kennedy Brock, Patrick Kirch, Jared Monaco and Garrett Nickelsen while production was handled by Howard Benson. The track runs at 89 BPM and is in the key of D major. The song was made available for streaming on July 8, 2010 via the band's MySpace page, before it was released digitally on July 12, 2010. It was later released for radio airplay on August 6, 2010.

== Critical reception ==
Alternative Press magazine named the song as one of the best songs the group has released. The magazine noted, "A clean and polished pop song, it oozes with cheesiness, but that doesn't detract from how fun it is to sing along."

== Music video ==
The music video for "Right Girl" premiered on November 24, 2010 and was directed by Loren Brinton. The video showcases a tiger-headed man and the band members looking for a treasure hidden in the Arizona hills. Towards the end of the video, it shows the band performing an "alcohol-fueled fire ritual."

== Track listing ==
Digital download
No.	Title	Length
1.	"Right Girl"	3:37
2.	"Right Girl" (acoustic version)	3:42

== Personnel ==
The Maine

- John O'Callaghan – lead vocals
- Jared Monaco – lead guitar
- Kennedy Brock – rhythm guitar, backing vocals
- Garrett Nickelsen – bass guitar
- Pat Kirch – drums

Additional musicians

- Howard Benson – hammond organ, piano
- Marc Vangool – guitar
- Michito Sanchez – percussion

Production

- Andrew Schubert – additional engineer
- Brad Townsend – additional engineer
- Chris Lord-Alge – mixing
- Hatsukazu Inagaki – additional engineer
- Howard Benson – producer
- Keith Armstrong – assistant mixing engineer
- Mike Plotnikoff – recording engineer
- Nik Karpen – assistant mixing engineer
- Paul DeCarli – digital editor

== Charts ==
Chart performance for "Right Girl"
Chart (2010)	Peak position
US Rock Digital Song Sales (Billboard)	25

== Release history ==
Release dates and formats for "Right Girl"
Region	Date	Format	Label	Ref.
Various	July 12, 2010	Digital download	Warner	
United States	August 6, 2010	Contemporary hit radio	Warner	
