= All Caps (Weathers song) =

Single by Weathers featuring John the Ghost

from the album Are We Having Fun?
- Released: February 23, 2023
- Genre: Dance-pop; pop rock
- Length: 3:04
- Label: Sumerian
- Songwriters: Cameron Boyer; John O'Callaghan; Cameron Olsen
- Producers: Jason Suwito; O'Callaghan

Weathers featuring John the Ghost singles chronology
| "Where Do I Sign?" (2022) | "All Caps" (2023) | "She Hates Me" (2023) |

John the Ghost singles chronology
| "Lately" (2022) | "All Caps" (2023) |

Music video
- "All Caps" on YouTube

"All Caps" (stylized as ALL CAPS) is a song by American alternative rock band Weathers. It was released on February 23, 2023, as the second single from their third studio album Are We Having Fun? via Sumerian Records.

== Background and composition ==
"All Caps" was written by Cameron Boyer, John O'Callaghan and Cameron Olsen while production was handled by O'Callaghan and Jason Suwito. The song is about being in a toxic relationship and "how they transfer to our habits on and offline." Speaking about working with O'Callaghan, the group stated:

"We jumped at the opportunity to work with producer/singer John O'Callaghan... One of the biggest obstacles was deciding where John would sing. I felt like most projects like this have the featured artist start singing in the second verse. But for me, while it's a Weathers song, I wanted to throw listeners off and start with John's voice."

== Critical reception ==
Charlotte Griffiths of Distorted Sound described the song as a "pop-rock track," drawing comparison to the likes of 5 Seconds of Summer and Harry Styles.

== Music video ==
The music video for "All Caps" was released on February 23, 2023.

== Track listing ==
Digital download

| No. | Title | Length |
|---|---|---|
| 1. | "All Caps" (featuring John the Ghost) | 3:07 |

Rock mix

| No. | Title | Length |
|---|---|---|
| 1. | "All Caps" (featuring John the Ghost) | 3:07 |
| 2. | "All Caps" (featuring John the Ghost) (rock mix) | 3:04 |

== Personnel ==
Weathers

- Cameron Boyer – lead vocals, rhythm guitar
- Cameron Olsen – lead guitar, backing vocals
- Brennen Bates – bass, backing vocals

Additional musicians

- John the Ghost – featured artist, vocals

Production

- John O'Callaghan – producer
- Jason Suwito – producer

== Charts ==
Chart performance for "ALL CAPS"
| Chart (2023) | Peak position |
|---|---|
| US Alternative Airplay (Billboard) | 8 |

== Release history ==
Release history for "All Caps"
| Region | Date | Format | Label | Ref(s). |
|---|---|---|---|---|
| Various | February 23, 2023 | Digital download; streaming | Sumerian | |
| Various | June 27, 2023 | Digital download; streaming | Sumerian | |
| United States | August 7, 2023 | Alternative radio | Sumerian | |
