= Sincerely, John the Ghost =

EP by John the Ghost
- Released: April 29, 2016
- Genre: Indie rock
- Length: 24:05
- Label: 8123
- Producer: John O'Callaghan

John the Ghost chronology
Sincerely, John the Ghost (2016)	I Only Want to Live Once (2021)

Singles from Sincerely, John the Ghost
- 1. "Sour Grapes" Released: April 12, 2016

Sincerely, John the Ghost is the debut extended play recorded by American indie rock singer John O'Callaghan under his alias John the Ghost. He released the EP on April 29, 2016. "Sour Grapes" was released as the first and only single from the EP.

== Background ==
O'Callaghan began going under the moniker John the Ghost in 2016. He wrote and recorded Sincerely, John the Ghost in his bedroom. "Sour Grapes" was released as the first single from the EP on April 12, 2016. To accompany the record, O'Callaghan also released a book of poetry titled the same name of his EP.

== Critical reception ==
Professional ratings
Review scores
Source	Rating
idobi Radio	A+

Jenna Romaine of idobi Radio gave the EP an A+ rating. She stated, "unsurprisingly, what shines the most are the lyrics." She also stated that the EP feels "candid and sincere," and is bound to "capture listeners and keep them wanting more." She ended off remarking, "this is a debut EP you’ll want to be able to keep re-living and re-playing." Alternative Press named the EP as one of the solo projects to check out in 2016.

== Track listing ==
All tracks are written by John O'Callaghan.

No.	Title	Length
1.	"Sour Grapes"	4:13
2.	"Nowandlater"	4:19
3.	"Everyone Is a DJ"	4:10
4.	"The Whole of Your Heart"	2:41
5.	"Red House"	4:16
6.	"All at Once"	4:26
Total length:		24:05

== Charts ==
Chart performance for Sincerely, John the Ghost
Chart (2016)	Peak position
US Top Alternative Albums (Billboard)	25
US Heatseekers Albums (Billboard)	9
US Top Rock Albums (Billboard)	40
