= Weathers (band) =

American rock band

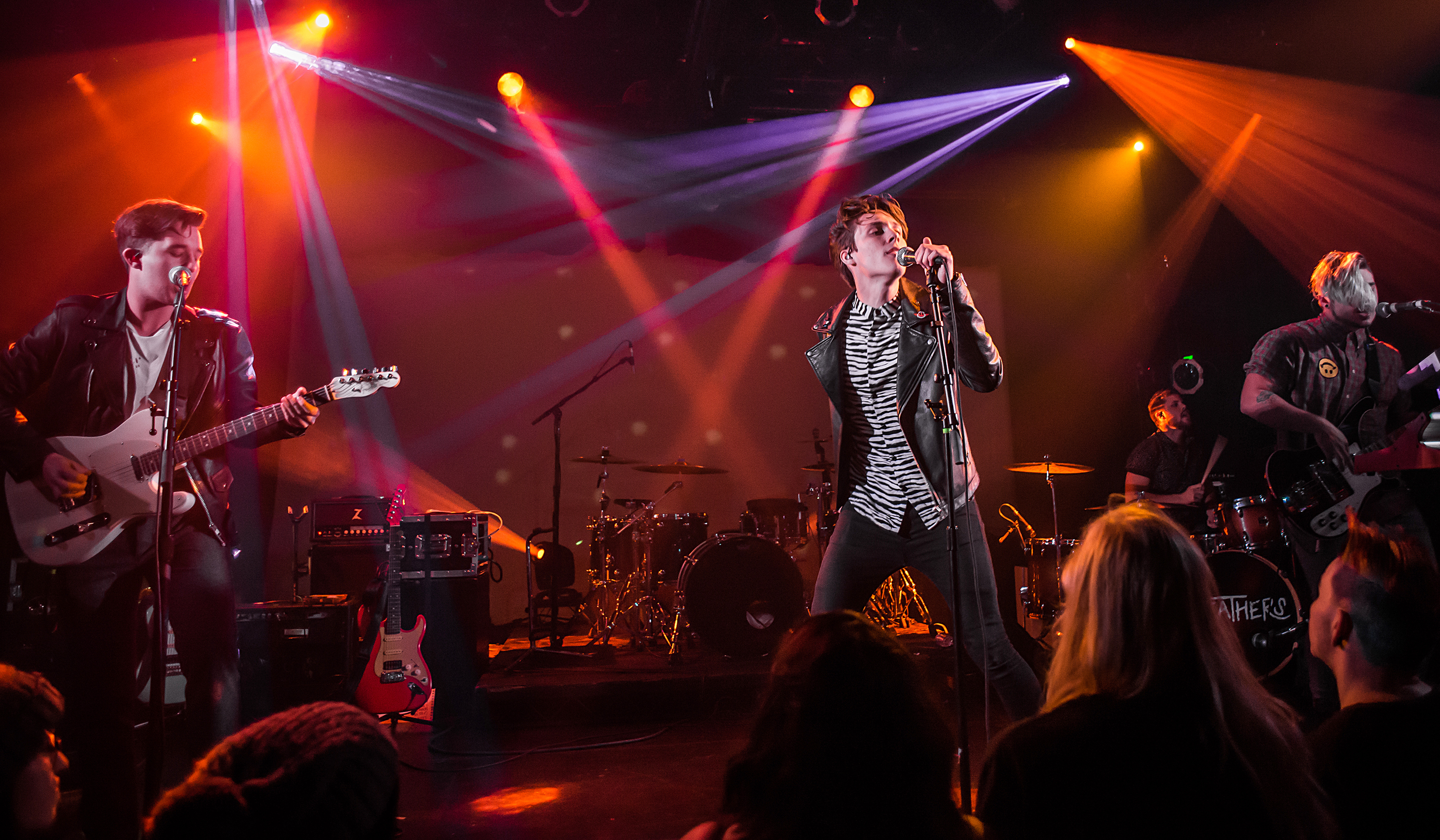
- Weathers band performing in 2016. Left to right: Cameron Olsen, Cameron Boyer, Cole Carson, Brennen Bates

Background information
- Origin: Los Angeles, California, US
- Genres: Alternative rock; indie rock; pop rock; emo
- Years active: 2015–present
- Labels: RCA; Sumerian
- Members: Cameron Boyer; Cameron Olsen; Brennen Bates; Christian Champion
- Past members: Cole Carson
- Website: weathersband.com

Weathers is an American alternative rock band from Los Angeles consisting of lead vocalist Cameron Boyer, guitarist Cameron Olsen, bassist Brennen Bates, and drummer Christian Champion. Their music is characterized by driving, upbeat anthems contrasted by introspective lyrics that focus on the themes of coming of age and mental health.

Their style is inspired by the counterculture of the late twentieth and early twenty-first century. Weathers has toured supporting many alternative acts, including Saint Motel, Nothing but Thieves, Dreamers, K.Flay, Palaye Royale, One Ok Rock, Badflower, Echosmith, Meg Myers, and The Maine.

== History ==
=== Formation ===
The band's roots trace to 2011 when Cameron Boyer initially formed an ensemble known as One Youth, before transitioning to the moniker Above Seclusion, under which two albums were released. Brennen Bates was recruited to the band after responding to Boyer's audition post on Facebook.

Cameron Olsen crossed paths with Boyer during the 2012 Manhattan Beach Battle of the Bands, where Olsen was competing with his own band, called Colorblind. Former member Cole Carson was recruited as the band’s drummer in the fall of 2013. Carson's father and Boyer's father were members of a high school cover band called Wild Cats, establishing a musical connection between the two.

On July 9, 2014, Above Seclusion underwent another rebranding, adopting the name Signal City. The band unveiled their debut track, "Fortune". The band released four singles before officially forming as Weathers in October 2015. Members of the band have cited modern acts such as The Killers, The All American Rejects, Sir Sly, My Chemical Romance, as well as bands of the 80's and 90's such as Depeche Mode, The Cure, Pixies, and The Police, as influences.

=== Debut singles and Kids In The Night (2018) ===
Weathers released the singles "I Don't Wanna Know" and "Happy Pills" in 2015. "Happy Pills" was the most added song on alternative radio on its impact date, receiving the most adds for a new artist in the 2010s. "Happy Pills" peaked at No. 21 on the Billboard Alternative Songs chart.

Weathers debuted their album Kids In The Night (2018) in two separate EPs. Lead singer Cameron Boyer claimed that the first part of the album is about "accepting your flaws and realizing that the so-called 'bad' things about you are actually what shape you into who you are now — a stronger, better person. It's asking, 'Are the bad things really bad or are they just temporarily hard?'".

=== Pillows & Therapy (2021) and EPs ===
In 2018, the non-album single "Problems" and its acoustic version were released. The subsequent year saw the release of non-album singles "Dirty Money", "Lonely Vampire", and "Always Tired". In 2020, non-album single "Feel Good" and a cover of Britney Spears’ "Lucky" were released, along with the web exclusive EP Our Little Secret. In 2021, Weathers released their second web exclusive EPs Our Other Little Secret and later their second album Pillows & Therapy.

In February 2022, Weathers released the single "Alone Again" featuring Robert DeLong. The single was part of their third web exclusive EP My Friends Have Better Friends. Four days later, drummer Cole Carson announced his departure.

=== Are We Having Fun? (2023) ===
On May 5, 2023, Weathers released Are We Having Fun? The album was produced by Jason Suwito. The album includes the single "All Caps" featuring John the Ghost. "All Caps" remains their highest charting song to date. Music videos were released for both "All Caps" and "One of a Kind".

== Band members ==
=== Current members ===
- Cameron Boyer – lead vocals, rhythm guitar, piano, keyboards (2015–present)
- Cameron Olsen – lead guitar, backing vocals (2015–present)
- Brennen Bates – bass, backing vocals, piano, keyboards (2015–present)
- Christian Champion – drums (2024–present; touring 2022-2024)

=== Former members ===
- Cole Carson – drums, percussion, backing vocals (2015–2022)

== Discography ==
=== Studio albums ===
- Kids in the Night (2018)
- Pillows and Therapy (2021)
- Are We Having Fun? (2023)

=== Extended plays ===
- Kids in the Night - Part 1 (2018)
- Kids in the Night - Part 2 (2018)
- Our Little Secret (2020)
- Our Other Little Secret (2021)
- Demos & Relics Vol 1 (2021)
- Demos & Relics Vol 2 (2021)
- Demos & Relics Vol 3 (2021)
- My Friends Have Better Friends (2022)

=== Singles ===
As Primary Artist

Title	Year	Peak chart positions		Certifications	Album
Title	Year	Alternative Songs	Rock Airplay	Certifications	Album
"I Don't Wanna Know"	2016	—	—		Non-album singles
"Happy Pills"	2016	21	42	RIAA: Gold	Non-album singles
"Dirty Money"	2019	—	—		Non-album singles
"Problems"	2019	—	—		Non-album singles
"Problems" (Acoustic)	2019	—	—		Non-album singles
"Lonely Vampire"	2019	—	—		Non-album singles
"Always Tired"	2019	—	—		Non-album singles
"Feel Good"	2020	—	—		Non-album singles
"C'est La Vie"	2020	—	—		Pillows & Therapy
"Lucky" (with Songs That Saved My Life)	2020	—	—		Non-album single
"Losing Blood"	2021	—	—		Pillows & Therapy
"C'est La Vie" (Cinematic Mix)	2021	—	—		Non-album single
"Rehab"	2021	—	—		Pillows & Therapy
"Karma"	2021	—	—		Pillows & Therapy
"Alone Again" (featuring Robert DeLong)	2022	—	—		Non-album single
"Where Do I Sign?"	2022	—	—		Are We Having Fun?
"All Caps" (featuring John the Ghost)	2023	8	—		Are We Having Fun?
"She Hates Me"	2023	—	—		Are We Having Fun?
"All Caps" (featuring John the Ghost; Rock Mix)	2023	—	—		Non-album singles
"Wasn't Gonna Go Out"	2024	30	—		Non-album singles
"Killer"	2024	—	—		American Psycho (From The "American Psycho" Comic Series Soundtrack)
"Wasn't Gonna Go Out" (Demo)	2025	—	—		Non-album singles
"Birthday Song"	2025	—	—		Non-album singles
"Ugly"	2026	—	—		Non-album singles
"Waste Me"	2026	—	—		Non-album singles
"—" denotes a recording that did not chart.

As Featured Artist

Title	Year	Peak chart positions		Certifications	Album
Title	Year	Alternative Songs	Rock Airplay	Certifications	Album
"Unhappy Hour" (With Voilà)	2025	—	—		The Last Laugh (Part I)
"—" denotes a recording that did not chart.
