= Best Intentions (album) =

Studio album by We Are the In Crowd
- Released: October 4, 2011
- Recorded: June–July 2011
- Genre: Pop rock, alternative rock, pop punk
- Length: 31:52
- Label: Hopeless
- Producer: Zack Odom, Kenneth Mount

We Are the In Crowd chronology
Guaranteed to Disagree (2010)	Best Intentions (2011)	Weird Kids (2014)

Singles from Best Intentions
- 1. "Rumor Mill" Released: July 26, 2011; 2. "On Your Own" Released: November 16, 2011; 3. "Kiss Me Again" Released: March 13, 2012; 4. "Exits and Entrances" Released: July 10, 2012

Best Intentions is the debut studio album by American rock band We Are the In Crowd.

== Background ==
On May 12, 2011, the band posted a preview clip of a new song online. Also in May, the group supported Mayday Parade on their UK tour. On June 21, the group revealed they were in the last week of recording for their debut album. Four days later, the group posted a studio update video. On July 2, the band announced they had finished recording. In July, the band was planned to support Taking Back Sunday on their US tour. However, the group could not go it as they had gone "way over our recording schedule and it conflicts with the dates on the tour ... and we want to make sure we release something that wasn’t compromised because of timing or conflicts". On July 7, the group posted another studio video update. On July 17, Alternative Press reported that the group had recently finished recording with producers Zack Odom and Kenneth Mount.

"This Isn't Goodbye, It's BRB" was written for inclusion on the band's first EP, but was rejected. The bridge section was used for "Carry Me Home", resulting in a new version of the song being written for Best Intentions.

== Release ==
In July and August, the band supported All Time Low on their North America tour, dubbed Gimme Summer Ya' Love. "Rumor Mill" was released as a single on July 26. A lyric video was posted for the track the following day. On August 3, Best Intentions was announced for released in October. In addition, the album's artwork was revealed. On September 2, "On Your Own" was made available for streaming via Alternative Press. On September 26, "Better Luck Next Time" was made available for streaming. In late September and early October, the band toured Australia as part of the Soundwave Counter-Revolution festival. Best Intentions was made available for streaming on September 29, before being released on October 4 through Hopeless Records. The iTunes version of the album includes three bonus tracks. To celebrate its release, the band performed three in-store acoustic gigs at record shops. On October 26, a music video for "Rumor Mill" premiered on MTV. In October and November, the band supported Mayday Parade on their headlining US tour, titled Noise Tour.

In December, the band performed at a Glamour Kills holiday festival. In January and February 2012, the band supported All Time Low on their UK tour. In November and December, the band supported Yellowcard on their headlining tour of the US. On February 1, 2012, the band posted an acoustic version of "Rumor Mill" on their Facebook page as a free download. In February and March, the group went on a co-headlining US tour with Every Avenue. They were supported by Plug in Stereo, Simple as Surgery and The Audition. On March 12, the band released a new version of "Kiss Me Again" that included a feature from All Time Low frontman Alex Gaskarth. A lyric video for this version was released the following day. A music video subsequently followed on March 27, with a premier on MTV. The video was filmed in February. A music video was released for "Exits and Entrances" on July 10. In February and March 2013, the band supported The Summer Set on their headlining US tour. In April and May, the group went on a co-headlining UK tour with Never Shout Never. They then toured Japan in June 2013 with Hit the Lights, Set It Off, Divided by Friday, Like Torches and July.

== Reception ==
Professional ratings
Review scores
Source	Rating
AbsolutePunk	70%
Rock Sound	7/10 stars
Rockfreaks.net	6.5/10 stars
Stitched Sound	4/5 stars

The album was included at number 30 on Rock Sound's "The 51 Most Essential Pop Punk Albums of All Time" list.

In the UK the album has peaked at number 10 on the alternative chart.

== Track listing ==
All songs written by We Are the In Crowd, except where noted.

No.	Title	Length
1.	"Rumor Mill"	3:39
2.	"This Isn't Goodbye, It's BRB"	3:08
3.	"The Worst Thing About Me"	2:43
4.	"Kiss Me Again" (We Are the In Crowd, Alexei Misoul, Dan Book, Andrew Goldstein)	3:19
5.	"On Your Own" (Stevie Aiello, We Are the In Crowd)	3:23
6.	"All or Nothing" (We Are the In Crowd, Misoul, Book, Goldstein)	3:08
7.	"Exits and Entrances"	3:07
8.	"See You Around" (JP Clark, Nick Manic, Fred Fencke)	2:59
9.	"You've Got It Made"	3:42
10.	"Better Luck Next Time"	2:51
Total length:		31:52

iTunes bonus tracks
No.	Title	Length
11.	"On My Way" (Demo)	3:14
12.	"Rumor Mill" (acoustic)	3:49
13.	"Grenade" (Bruno Mars cover)	3:43
14.	"Kiss Me Again" (feat. Alex Gaskarth)	3:21
Total length:		46:01

== Personnel ==
Personnel per sleeve.

We Are the In Crowd

- Taylor Jardine – lead vocals, violin on "You've Got It Made"
- Jordan Eckes – co-lead vocals, guitar
- Mike Ferri – bass guitar
- Cameron Hurley – guitar
- Rob Chianelli – drums

Production and design

- Zack Odom – producer
- Kenneth Mount – producer
- Tom Falcone – photos
- Chris Hansen – layout

== Chart positions ==
Chart (2011)	Peak position
U.S. Billboard 200	122
U.S. Billboard Independent Albums	20
U.S. Billboard Top Heatseekers	2
