= Charles E. Kelly (soldier) =

United States Army soldier (1920–1985)

- Born: September 23, 1920; Pittsburgh, Pennsylvania, US
- Died: January 11, 1985 (aged 64); Pittsburgh, Pennsylvania, US
- Burial place: Highwood Cemetery, Pittsburgh, Pennsylvania
- Military career
- Allegiance: United States of America
- Branch: United States Army
- Service years: 1942 - 1945
- Rank: Technical Sergeant
- Nicknames: "Commando Kelly"; "The One Man Army"."
- Service number: 13085671
- Units: 3rd Battalion, 143rd Infantry Regiment, 36th Infantry Division
- Conflicts: World War II
- Awards: Medal of Honor

Charles E. Kelly (September 23, 1920 – January 11, 1985) was a United States Army soldier and a recipient of the United States military's highest decoration for valor—the Medal of Honor—for his actions in World War II. Kelly was the third enlisted man to be decorated with the Medal of Honor for action on the European continent, after S/Sgt Maynard H. Smith, 306th Bomb Group (St Nazaire and Brest May 1, 1943) and Flight Officer (a temporary, non-commissioned warrant rank) John C. "Red" Morgan, 92nd Bomb Group, Hanover, July 28, 1943.

== Biography ==
Prior to his military service, the youthful Charles Kelly had made his living with a street gang in his hometown of Pittsburgh, Pennsylvania and frequently got in trouble with the law. Kelly joined the Army in Pittsburgh in May 1942, and by September 13, 1943, was serving as a corporal in Company L, 143rd Infantry Regiment, 36th Infantry Division. After voluntarily participating in several patrols on that day, near Altavilla, Italy, he helped to defend an ammunition storehouse against attack by German forces. He held his position behind the storehouse all night, then took up a position inside the building. When withdrawal became necessary, he voluntarily stayed behind and held the German soldiers at bay until everyone had been evacuated from the storehouse, at which time he withdrew and was able to rejoin his unit. For these actions, he was awarded the Medal of Honor five months later, on February 18, 1944.

=== Medal of Honor citation ===
Kelly's official Medal of Honor citation reads:

For conspicuous gallantry and intrepidity at risk of life above and beyond the call of duty. On 13 September 1943, near Altavilla, Italy, Cpl. Kelly voluntarily joined a patrol which located and neutralized enemy machine gun positions. After this hazardous duty he volunteered to establish contact with a battalion of U.S. infantry which was believed to be located on Hill 315, a mile distant. He traveled over a route commanded by enemy observation and under sniper, mortar, and artillery fire; and later he returned with the correct information that the enemy occupied Hill 315 in organized positions. Immediately thereafter Cpl. Kelly, again a volunteer patrol member, assisted materially in the destruction of 2 enemy machinegun nests under conditions requiring great skill and courage. Having effectively fired his weapon until all the ammunition was exhausted, he secured permission to obtain more at an ammunition dump. Arriving at the dump, which was located near a storehouse on the extreme flank of his regiment's position, Cpl. Kelly found that the Germans were attacking ferociously at this point. He obtained his ammunition and was given the mission of protecting the rear of the storehouse. He held his position throughout the night. The following morning the enemy attack was resumed. Cpl. Kelly took a position at an open window of the storehouse. One machine gunner had been killed at this position and several other soldiers wounded. Cpl. Kelly delivered continuous aimed and effective fire upon the enemy with his automatic rifle until the weapon locked from overheating. Finding another automatic rifle, he again directed effective fire upon the enemy until this weapon also locked. At this critical point, with the enemy threatening to overrun the position, Cpl. Kelly picked up 60mm. mortar shells, pulled the safety pins, and used the shells as grenades, killing at least 5 of the enemy. When it became imperative that the house be evacuated, Cpl. Kelly, despite his sergeant's injunctions, volunteered to hold the position until the remainder of the detachment could withdraw. As the detachment moved out, Cpl. Kelly was observed deliberately loading and firing a rocket launcher from the window. He was successful in covering the withdrawal of the unit, and later in joining his own organization. Cpl. Kelly's fighting determination and intrepidity in battle exemplify the highest traditions of the U.S. Armed Forces.

After receiving the Medal, Kelly toured the country with a group of other infantrymen as part of the Army Ground Forces' "Here's Your Infantry," demonstrating various battle techniques and selling war bonds. When the tour ended, Kelly was assigned to the Infantry School at Fort Benning, Georgia.

Kelly received an honorable discharge from the Army in 1945, and the rank of technical sergeant.

=== Post war life ===
Kelly was less successful in his personal life. He opened a service station on the North Side of Pittsburgh in 1946, but was forced to sell it in 1947 after a downturn in business and a robbery. His wife Mae was diagnosed with uterine cancer that same year, and died in 1951. The cost of the radiation treatments for Mae eventually resulted in Kelly losing his home in foreclosure.

In 1950, Charles Kelly signed an age waiver for his younger brother Danny that enabled him to enlist in the army at age 17. Shortly after his training, Danny Kelly was deployed to the Korean War. One week after arriving in Korea, he was reported as missing in action and was never found.

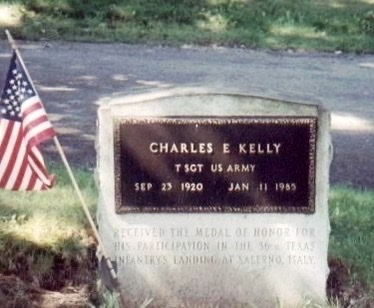
Graveside photo of Charles "Commando" Kelly

In 1952, while traveling across the country campaigning for Dwight D. Eisenhower, Kelly was reintroduced to Betty Gaskin, a young woman he had met while stationed at Fort Knox. The two were married six weeks later, and moved to Louisville, Kentucky. In a 1957 interview with Mike Wallace, Kelly defended Samuel David Hawkins, a Korean War captive who declined repatriation until that year and was called a turncoat.

Kelly spent most of his life holding down a series of short lived jobs. This, coupled with poor health, led to financial difficulties and problems with alcohol. Kelly left his second wife and children in 1961; they were divorced in 1962. In late 1984 Kelly was admitted to Veterans Hospital in Pittsburgh, suffering from kidney and liver failure. He died January 11, 1985, at age 64. A devoted Pittsburgh North Sider, his last known residence was the Hanuaer-Rosenberg Residence in Pittsburgh's Deutschtown. He was buried at Highwood Cemetery in his hometown of Pittsburgh.

Even though he had a problem with alcohol, his story and legacy have helped many many people achieve recovery. Two local Pittsburgh Alcoholics Anonymous meetings "Camp Kelly" and "Oakdale Beginners Group" have meetings 4 days a week for any one who has a desire to stop drinking.

== Awards and decorations ==

Badge	Combat Infantryman Badge		
1st row	Medal of Honor	Bronze Star Medal	Army Good Conduct Medal
2nd row	American Campaign Medal	European–African–Middle Eastern Campaign Medal with one campaign star	World War II Victory Medal

== Other honors ==
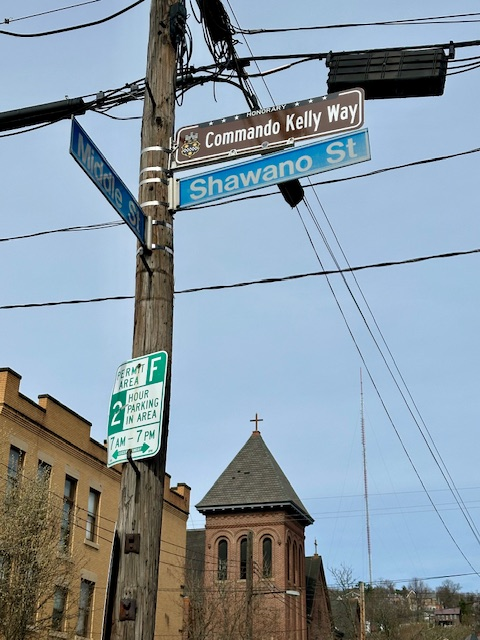
Honorary Commando Kelly Way sign in Pittsburgh

In 1987, the Oakdale Army Support Element in Oakdale, Pennsylvania was redesignated the Charles E. Kelly Support Facility. In 2024 the City of Pittsburgh dedicated Shawano Street (where Kelly grew up and returned home from the front) "Honorary Commando Kelly Way".

== See also ==
- List of Medal of Honor recipients
- List of Medal of Honor recipients for World War II
