= Joy Next Door =

Studio album by the Maine
- Released: April 10, 2026
- Studio: 8123 Studios
- Genres: Alternative rock; pop rock; indie rock
- Length: 39:37
- Labels: 8123; Photo Finish
- Producers: John O'Callaghan; Sean Slverman

The Maine chronology
Dyed (2008-2023) (2025)	Joy Next Door (2026)

Singles from The Maine
- 1. "Die to Fall" Released: January 28, 2026; 2. "Quiet Part Loud" Released: February 25, 2026; 3. "Palms" Released: March 24, 2026

Joy Next Door is the tenth studio album by American rock band the Maine. It was released on April 10, 2026, via 8123 and Photo Finish Records. The album is supported by three singles: "Die to Fall", "Quiet Part Loud" and "Palms".

The group embarked on a headlining I Love You But I Chose The Maine Tour, in support of the album, from March to May 2026. The band also made their first ever televised performance on The Kelly Clarkson Show in promotion of the record.

== Background ==
On July 10, 2024, the band released a new single titled, "Touch". According to bassist Garrett Nickelsen, this was the start of the writing process for the album. The track was inspired by an "early 2000s" sound, which they felt was going to be the theme for the next album. However, with lead singer John O'Callaghan writing more music and adding piano and acoustic, the theme for the record began to change. He ended up writing songs from his perspective and about things that "pertain" to him.

In January 2025, the group released a surprise EP titled Dyed (2008-2023). The EP features nine tracks which were unreleased demos from each of their previous albums. On September 29, the group joined the Jonas Brothers on their Jonas20: Greetings from Your Hometown Tour in Phoenix, Arizona, as a surprise guest performing "Black Butterflies and Deja Vu". Shortly after, O'Callaghan confirmed that they were working on their tenth studio album.

On January 22, 2026, the band announced the album's title, Joy Next Door, with a release date for April 10, 2026. Drummer Pat Kirch described the new era as "a new beginning." He also said the album's title comes from "the idea that happiness is not a destination you get to, it's a constantly evolving thing."

== Composition and recording ==
Recording for Joy Next Door took place in Arizona at 8123 Studios and was written over the course of 14–15 months. It was produced by O'Callaghan and Sean Silverman. The band decided to not have a deadline to complete the album, which resulted in the process being stretched out, according to O'Callaghan. It became their longest album to finish to date, though O'Callaghan believed it was also their most "complete record" to date. Additionally, he said they wanted to keep the album authentic, making it as raw and organic as possible. The songs were recorded in chronological order, so that the "mood" of the album "made sense and flowed together," according to Kirch. On the writing process, O'Callaghan said they wanted to "strip away what we thought people wanted and fully focus on what would make us feel fulfilled." Kirch felt that the album was the hardest one they've made to date, avoiding to repeat themselves and setting the bar high. The band was thinking of nature aspects when coming up with ideas for the album, leading to Kirch suggesting a song titled "Green", the album's opening track, which they believed "'just feels right'." O'Callaghan said "Die to Fall" was about his "desire" of letting go and appreciate "moments we can often take for granted." On "Quiet Part Loud", Kirch stated the track was an opportunity to showcase that the album "has depth." He also said the band tried not to overdo it with the instrumentation, so you could "really hear each part." The track is described as indie rock. By the time they entered the studio, "And Then", "It's Not Over Yet", and "Quiet Part Loud" were almost completed.

== Release ==
On January 28, 2026, "Die to Fall" was released as the album's lead single. Along with its release, a music video directed by Guadalupe Bustos, premiered on the band's YouTube channel. "Quiet Part Loud" was released on February 25, as the second single from the album. The band released the album's third single "Palms" on March 24. Ahead of the album's release, the band premiered the music videos to "Green" and "Half a Spark" in early April. On May 15, the band released a surprise track titled, "Parking Garage Song #5", which was added on the album. On June 24, the band released the music video for "3:31".

== Promotion ==
In December 2025, the band announced their first headlining tour in two years, called the I Love You But I Chose The Maine Tour. The tour, supporting the album, began on March 24, 2026, and concluded on May 2, taking place in North America. They were supported by Nightly, Grayscale, Franklin Jonas, Friday Pilots Club, Broadside, and Moody Joody, on selected dates. The group also made their first televised performance on The Kelly Clarkson Show to promote the album's release, performing "Die to Fall". A European leg was announced for the tour, with the band scheduled to perform in the United Kingdom in September 2026, with support from Grayscale.

== Critical reception ==
Professional ratings
Review scores
Source	Rating
Chorus.fm	Positive
Highlight Magazine	9/10
Melodic	2.5/5 stars
New Noise Magazine	4/5 stars

Joy Next Door was met with positive reviews from music critics. Adam Grundy of Chorus.fm said the album is "worthy of the legacy that the band has created for themselves." He further wrote, "Joy Next Door may not be the album that people expected from The Maine at the high point of their career, but it's a record that they needed to make and put out into the world in order to move forward [...] That concept is worth applauding The Maine for as they navigate their way through a life in music that is for the better because they're such a big part of it." Rachael Dowd of Highlight Magazine praised the tracks "Green" and "Alone for a Year", and remarked, "There are so many elements in Joy Next Door that really catch the listener's attention, from the instrumentals alone to the lyricism and beyond." Lamar Ramos of New Noise Magazine stated the band "doesn't try to reinvent [...] It feels like a band taking a step back to really appreciate how far they've come." A mixed response was written by Kaj Roth of Melodic, who felt the album was "a bit too safe." Though he praised "Half a Spark", "Palms" and "Die to Fall", calling them "stand outs" from the album, he described the rest of the album, "perfect as background music in the shopping mall."

== Track listing ==
All tracks are written by John O'Callaghan, except where noted.

CD edition
No.	Title	Writer(s)	Length
1.	"Green"	John O'Callaghan; Jared Monaco; Kennedy Brock; Pat Kirch; Garrett Nickelsen; Andrew Goldstein	2:50
2.	"Alone for a Year"		3:22
3.	"Half a Spark"		2:50
4.	"Palms"	O'Callaghan; Monaco; Brock; Kirch; Nickelsen	3:18
5.	"Joy Next Door"	O'Callaghan; Monaco; Brock; Kirch; Nickelsen	3:59
6.	"3:31"	O'Callaghan; Monaco; Brock; Kirch; Nickelsen	3:55
7.	"Quiet Part Loud"		3:08
8.	"Die to Fall"		3:20
9.	"A Brief Commercial Break"		1:51
10.	"It's Not Over Yet"		3:49
11.	"And Then"		4:14
Total length:			36:36

Digital edition
No.	Title	Length
8.	"Parking Garage Song #5"	3:01
9.	"Die to Fall"	3:20
10.	"A Brief Commercial Break"	1:51
11.	"It's Not Over Yet"	3:49
12.	"And Then"	4:14
Total length:		39:37

== Personnel ==
Credits retrieved from album's liner notes.

The Maine

- John O'Callaghan – vocals, composer, lyricist, guitar, keyboard
- Kennedy Brock – rhythm guitar, backing vocals, composer, lyricist
- Jared Monaco – lead guitar, composer, lyricist
- Garrett Nickelsen – bass guitar, composer, lyricist
- Pat Kirch – drums, percussion, composer, lyricist

Additional musicians

- Andrew Goldstein – composer, lyricist (1)
- Sean Silverman – composer (2–4, 6)
- Kevin Fisher – composer (2–3)
- Zofia Smith – vocals (11)

Additional personnel

- John O'Callaghan – producer
- Sean Silverman – producer
- Alex Silverman – recording engineer
- Matt Keller – recording engineer, mixing (9)
- Randy Merrill – mastering
- Doug Weier – mixing

== Charts ==
Chart performance for Joy Next Door
Chart (2026)	Peak position
US Top Album Sales (Billboard)	32
US Indie Store Album Sales (Billboard)	4
