= We Are the In Crowd =

American rock band

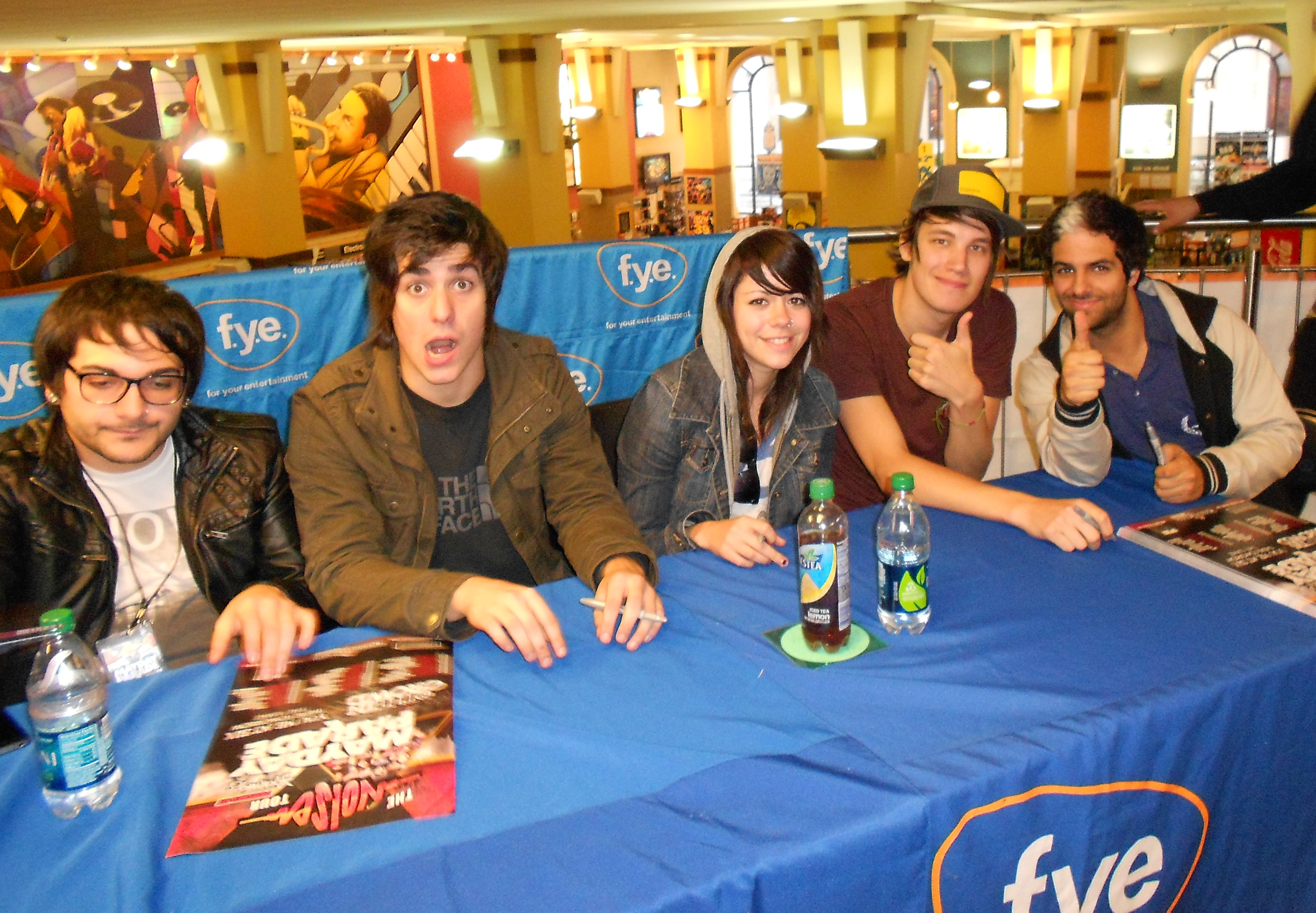
- We Are the In Crowd at a signing in Philadelphia

Background information
- Also known as: The In Crowd (2009)
- Origin: Poughkeepsie, New York, U.S.
- Genres: Pop rock; pop punk
- Years active: 2009–2016; 2019–present
- Label: Hopeless
- Members: Taylor Jardine; Jordan Eckes; Mike Ferri; Rob Chianelli; Cameron Hurley

We Are the In Crowd is an American rock band from Poughkeepsie, New York, formed in 2009. It consists of Taylor Jardine, Jordan Eckes, Mike Ferri, Rob Chianelli, and Cameron Hurley. They released their debut EP, Guaranteed to Disagree, in 2010, and followed it up with their first full-length album, Best Intentions, in 2011. Their second full-length album, Weird Kids, was released in 2014. The band announced a hiatus in February 2016. They have since performed at Slam Dunk Festival 2021, and When We Were Young Festival in 2024.

In 2025, Terry Bezer of Screen Rant included the band in his list of "10 Forgotten Pop-Punk Bands Who Deserve To Be Better Remembered".

== History ==
The band was formed in 2006.

In April 2009, We Are the In Crowd's Myspace page was hacked. The hacker was an ex-member of the band and deleted all of their friends and music. The news attracted the attention of someone at Hopeless Records who contacted the band shortly after. Jardine made a video on YouTube announcing the hack.

On November 10, 2009, the group announced their signing with Hopeless Records as "The In Crowd" and released their first single "For the Win" on iTunes. The band changed their name to "We Are the In Crowd" due to trademark issues with a reggae band from the seventies who were also called "The In Crowd".

In February 2010, We Are the In Crowd recorded their debut Hopeless Records EP with producers Zack Odom and Kenneth Mount (All Time Low, Mayday Parade, Jimmy Eat World, Cartel). The EP, titled Guaranteed To Disagree, was released on June 8, 2010.

We Are the In Crowd entered the studio in early May 2011 to begin recording their full-length debut. On August 3, 2011, it was announced the album would be titled Best Intentions, with a release date of October 4. It debuted on the U.S. Billboard 200 at No. 122. The band toured with acts such as All Time Low and Mayday Parade, and have appeared at Warped Tour in 2010 and 2012, and festivals such as Leeds. In 2013, the band toured around much of the world, including the UK.

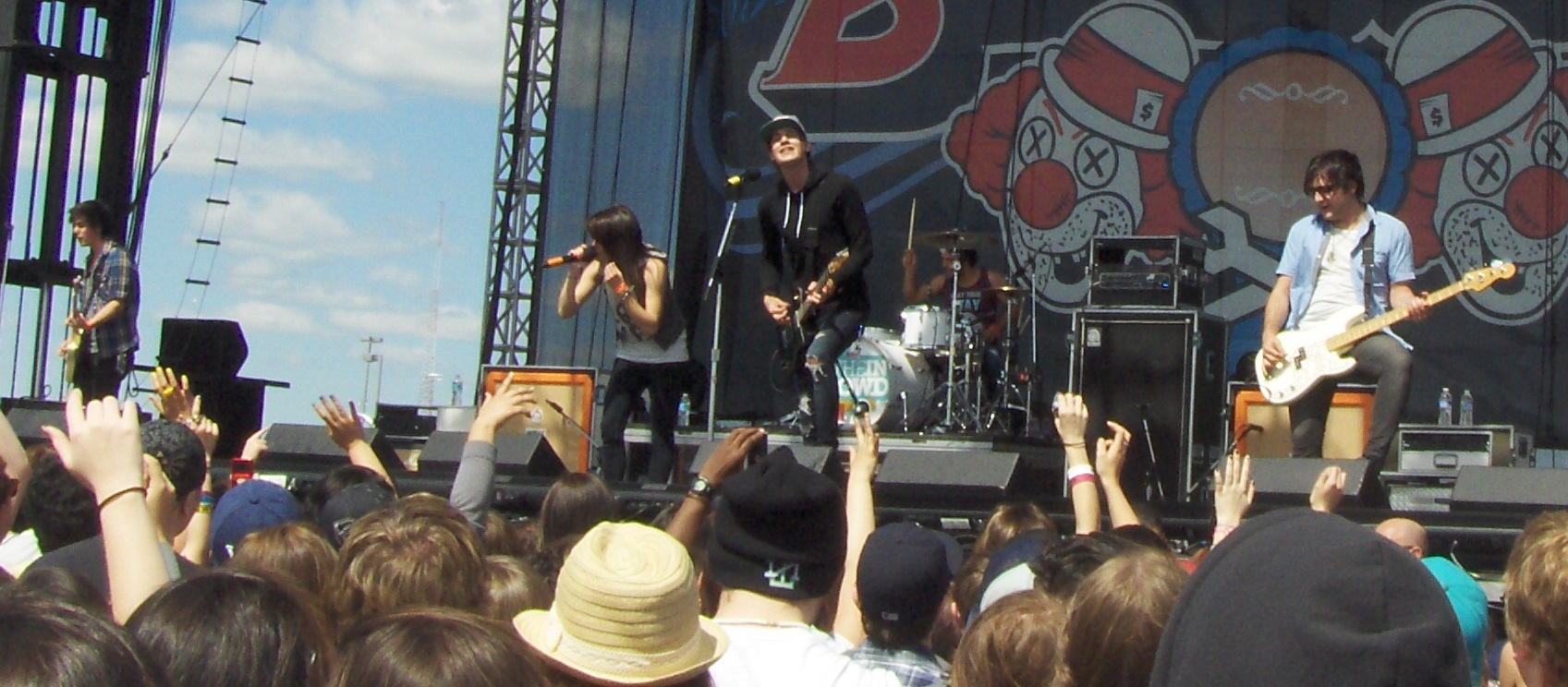
WATIC at Bamboozle 2011

The band announced via a Fuse video interview that they would be recording material for a new album. On August 20, 2013, they released their new single "Attention".

On the December 3, 2013, We Are the In Crowd announced that they would be releasing a new album entitled Weird Kids, set for release on the February 18, 2014. They also announced a UK tour in late January followed by a US tour. The second single from the album, "The Best Thing (That Never Happened)", was released on Spotify that same day, and due to the "overwhelming response" they released it on iTunes the same day, a few days early.

In August 2014 the band were announced as the support acts for British rock band Don Broco during their Kerrang! tour in February 2015.

In February 2015, Taylor Jardine made a video announcement confirming that the band would soon begin writing and recording their third full-length album.

On May 4, 2015, band members Mike Ferri, Cameron Hurley and Taylor Jardine all tweeted that the third full-length has been finished.

On February 10, 2016, Taylor Jardine announced the band were going on hiatus. During this hiatus, Jardine began performing under the name 'Sainte', with Cameron Hurley, Mike Ferri, and Rob Chianelli involved creatively. Under this moniker, Jardine released the album "Smile, and Wave" in 2017, and the EP "Bad Summer" in 2019. As of 2024, the website for Sainte is no longer active, and the Instagram username redirects to an unrelated account.

On October 21, 2019, the band tweeted an illustration of themselves dressed up as cowboys riding a horse, hinting at a potential reunion in the near future. Two days later, that reunion was officially confirmed when it was announced that they would be playing at Slam Dunk Fest in the UK in 2020, before the coronavirus pandemic hit and Slam Dunk Fest had to be pushed back to September 2021.

On November 16, 2023, the band shared that they would be performing at When We Were Young Festival in Las Vegas, Nevada. According to their own caption, this would mark their "first time on American soil since 2015".

== Band members ==
- Taylor Jardine – lead vocals, keyboards, violin
- Jordan Eckes – co-lead vocals, rhythm guitar
- Cameron Hurley – lead guitar, backing vocals
- Mike Ferri – bass
- Rob Chianelli – drums

== Discography ==
=== Studio albums ===
| Year | Album | Chart positions | | |
| Year | Album | Billboard 200 | Top Heatseekers | Independent Albums |
|---|---|---|---|---|
| 2011 | Best Intentions: Released October 4, 2011; Label: Hopeless Records | 122 | 2 | 20 |
| 2014 | Weird Kids: Released February 18, 2014; Label: Hopeless Records | 29 | – | 5 |

=== EPs ===
- Guaranteed to Disagree (2010)

=== Singles ===
| Year | Title |
|---|---|
| 2009 | "This Isn't Rocket Surgery" |
| 2009 | "Easy" |
| 2009 | "For the Win" |
| 2009 | "Never Be What You Want" |
| 2010 | "Both Sides of the Story" |
| 2010 | "Lights Out" |
| 2011 | "Rumor Mill" |
| 2011 | "On Your Own" |
| 2011 | "Kiss Me Again (ft. Alex Gaskarth)" |
| 2011 | "Exits and Entrances" |
| 2013 | "Attention" |
| 2013 | "The Best Thing (That Never Happened)" |
| 2014 | "Long Live The Kids" |
| 2014 | "Windows In Heaven" |
| 2014 | "Manners" |

=== Music videos ===
| Year | Title |
|---|---|
| 2010 | "This Isn't Rocket Surgery" |
| 2010 | "For the Win" |
| 2010 | "Never Be What You Want" |
| 2010 | "Both Sides of the Story" |
| 2011 | "Rumor Mill" |
| 2011 | "Kiss Me Again" (featuring Alex Gaskarth) |
| 2011 | "On Your Own" |
| 2012 | "Exits and Entrances" |
2013
| 2013 | "Sic Transit Gloria... Glory Fades" |
| 2013 | "The Best Thing (That Never Happened)" |
| 2013 | "Manners" |

== Tours ==
| Tour name | Other bands | Continent/country | Participating from – to |
|---|---|---|---|
| Vans Warped Tour | Skull Candy Stage w/ Breathe Electric, Confide, In Fear and Faith Of Mice and Men | North America | June 25 – August 15, 2010 |
| Hey Monday Fall Tour | Hey Monday, Cartel, The Ready Set, This Century | North America | October 20 – November 27, 2010 |
| The Glamour Kills Tour 2011 | The Ready Set, Allstar Weekend, The Downtown Fiction, Marianas Trench | North America | February 23 – April 9, 2011 |
| Spring Break Your Heart Tour | Forever the Sickest Kids, Breathe Carolina, This Century, Before Their Eyes, Tonight Alive | North America | April 12–28, 2011 |
| The Bamboozle 2011 | Jumbo Stage w/ State Radio, Anberlin, Tokyo Police Club, Thrice, Circa Survive, Dashboard Confessional, Taking Back Sunday | North America | April 29 – May 2, 2011 |
| Mayday Parade UK Tour 2011 | Mayday Parade, A Rocket to the Moon, Blitz Kids | United Kingdom | May 16 – June 1, 2011 |
| Slam Dunk Festival 2011 | Atticus Stage w/ The Dangerous Summer, A Rocket to the Moon, Not Advised, Versa Emerge, Francesqa, Framing Hanley, Mayday Parade, 3OH!3 | United Kingdom | May 19–20, 2011 |
| Gimme Summer Ya Love Tour | All Time Low, The Starting Line, Mayday Parade, Brighter, The Cab, Cartel | North America | July 28 – August 27, 2011 |
| Counter Revolution 2011 | Annex Stage w/ We Are the Ocean, Terrible Things, Go Radio, Make Do and Mend | Australia | September 24 – October 3, 2011 |
| The Noise Tour 2011 | Mayday Parade, You Me at Six, There for Tomorrow, The Make | North America | October 13 – November 19, 2011 |
| Dirty Work UK Tour | All Time Low, The Maine | United Kingdom | January 12 – February 5, 2012 |
| I Like Tourtles Tour | Every Avenue, Plug in Stereo, Simple As Surgery, The Audition | North America | February 14 – March 25, 2012 |
| Southeast Asia Tour | | Southeast Asia | April 3–5, 2012 |
| Dude Where's My Country Tour | The Summer Set, Super Prime | Europe | April 11–26, 2012 |
| Vans Warped Tour | Tilly's Stage w/ A Loss for Words, Bayside, Lostprophets, Machine Gun Kelly, Man Overboard, Senses Fail, Vanna | North America | June 16 – August 5, 2012 |
| All Time Low UK Tour | All Time Low | United Kingdom | August 20–23, 2012 |
| Reading and Leeds | Festival Republic Stage w/ Blood or Whiskey, The Minutes, Theme Park, Citizens!, The Knux, Oberhofer, Don Broco, Jake Bugg, Dog Is Dead, Lower Than Atlantis, Young Guns, Feeder, Bassnectar | United Kingdom | August 24–26, 2012 |
| NoCapricho Festival | We the Kings, Before You Exit | Brazil | September 28, 2012 |
| Vans' Off the Wall Music Nights | Young Guns, Marmozets, Your Demise | United Kingdom | October 8–17, 2012 |
| Southern Air Tour | Yellowcard, The Wonder Years, Sandlot Heroes | North America | November 2 – December 2, 2012 |
| Mayday Parade Australian Tour | Mayday Parade, Heroes for Hire | Australia | December 7–9, 2012 |
| Wake Up and Be Awesome Tour | The Summer Set, Go Radio, For The Foxes | North America | February 21 – March 28, 2013 |
| Co-Headline w/ Never Shout Never Tour | Never Shout Never | Europe | April 16 – May 10, 2013 |
| Circuit Fest | Mayday Parade, Allstar Weekend, The Downtown Fiction, Before You Exit, Yellowcard, A+ Dropouts, This Century, and Megan Nicole | Philippines | May 25, 2013 |
| Beyond the Blue Tour | Hit the Lights, Set it Off, Divided by Friday | Japan | June 2–8, 2013 |
| Reading and Leeds | Main Stage w/ Bury Tomorrow, Hadouken!, Don Broco, Editors, The Lumineers, Fall Out Boy, Nine Inch Nails, Biffy Clyro | United Kingdom | August 23–25, 2013 |
| New Found Glory European Tour | New Found Glory | Europe | August 26–29, 2013 |
| Reunion Tour UK | Neck Deep, Save Your Breath | United Kingdom | January 27 – February 10, 2014 |
| Reunion Tour US | William Becket, Set it Off, State Champs, Candy Hearts | North America | February 21 – April 4, 2014 |
| So Devastating, It's Unnatural Tour | Mayday Parade, Transit, Divided by Friday | North America | April 30 – May 11, 2014 |
| Slam Dunk Festival 2014 | Main Stage w/ Blitz Kids, Canterbury, The Skints, We the Kings, Motion City Soundtrack, Mallory Knox, The All-American Rejects | United Kingdom | May 23–27, 2014 |
| Vans Warped Tour | Warheads Stage w/ Anberlin, Bad Rabbits, Cute Is What We Aim For, The Maine, The Protomen, The Ready Set, Saves the Day, This Wild Life | North America | June 13 – August 3, 2014 |
| Bazooka Rocks III | Main Stage w/ You Me at Six, The Summer Set, Echosmith, Coldrain | Philippines | August 31, 2014 |
| Glamour Kills Tour 2014 | New Found Glory, Fireworks, Candy Hearts, Red City Radio, Better Off | North America | October 3 – November 4, 2014 |
| A Very Non-Denominational Holiday Tour | | North America | December 16–21, 2014 |
| Kerrang Tour 2015 | Don Broco, Bury Tomorrow, Beartooth | United Kingdom | February 6–20, 2015 |
