= Black & White (The Maine album) =

Studio album by The Maine
- Released: July 12, 2010
- Studios: Bay 7 Studios; Sparky Dark Studio; Valley Village
- Genre: Pop rock
- Length: 35:22
- Label: Warner Bros.
- Producer: Howard Benson

The Maine chronology
...And a Happy New Year (2008)	Black & White (2010)	Pioneer (2011)

Singles from Black & White
- 1. "Inside of You" Released: May 3, 2010; 2. "Growing Up" Released: May 17, 2010

Black & White is the second studio album by The Maine and was released on July 12, 2010. The album features singles "Inside of You" and "Growing Up". It debuted at No. 16 on the Billboard 200 with 22,634 copies sold in its first week.

== Background and recording ==
After being invited to dinner following a show in New Jersey with then-CEO of Warner Bros. Records, Tom Whalley, it was announced that the group had recently signed to the major label in July 2009. They also signed with Action Theory and Sire Records in March 2010, and began recording the album.

Recorded in California with producer Howard Benson, Black & White sees The Maine stepping out of their comfort zone and creating a cohesive body of work that is an "album", in the most traditional sense of the word. The album sees the group maturing in their songwriting and diving into a rock sounding album. Many of the album's songs are about girls, as well as tracks about life experiences. According to singer John O'Callaghan, the label wanted the band to have a "modern Tom Petty" feel for the album. They also spent recording sessions working with Butch Walker. Guitarist Jared Monaco said they were "going for a polished, big-production sound," while learning what worked for the group.

"We're trying to go for more of a raw feel – really just a free, loose record", O'Callaghan explains. The album was inspired by the classic sounds of American rock-n-roll while also containing relatable themes that retain the sense of youthfulness and fun that is distinctly The Maine. Acoustic versions of the songs "Inside of You" and "Right Girl" can be found on YouTube as well as the deluxe version of the record.

== Release ==
"Inside of You" was released on the band's website as a promotional single and later announced as the first official single off the album on May 3, 2010, shortly after it had been uploaded as a lyrics video on their official YouTube page. The song peaked at number 14 on the Billboard Rock Digital Song Sales chart. "Growing Up" was released on May 17, as the second single for the album. The band posted an album trailer on June 10, featuring a clip of the song "Right Girl". The group preview another track from the album on June 29, titled "Saving Grace". On July 8, the group streamed an album sampler via their website. That same day, "Right Girl" was released for streaming on their MySpace page. The song peaked at number 25 on the Rock Digital Song Sales chart. The album was officially released on July 12. On the release date of the album, the band and their crew embarked on an entire 24-hour event which had been streamed live via their MySpace page, Ustream, and website. Everyone who viewed the event online had chances to win some prizes, see acoustic sets, and also receive calls from the band through their "Say Now" account. A music video for "Inside of You", directed by Mike Jones and Jim Sullos, was released on July 19.

In support of the album, the band embarked on their first headlining tour from July to August 2010, An Evening with The Maine. A music video for "Right Girl" was released on November 24, directed by former A Rocket to the Moon drummer, Loren Brinton. In March, the group went on a tour of the UK. "Don't Stop Now" was released as a free download through the group's Facebook profile. A video for "Listen to Your Heart" premiered via PureVolume on July 1. Throughout July, the group released a multi-part documentary about the making of the album.

== Critical reception ==
Professional ratings
Review scores
Source	Rating
AbsolutePunk	4/10
AllMusic	3/5 stars
Alternative Addiction	4.5/5 stars
Alter the Press!	2/5
Billboard	4/5 stars
Melodic	4/5 stars
The Cambridge Student	Unfavorable
Ultimate Guitar	6.7/10

Black & White received mixed to positive reviews. Tim Sendra of AllMusic stated that the album had "a more mature and measured approach." He complimented songs like "Fuel to the Fire" and "Right Girl", however was a lot more critical of the overall album stating, "the record and the band lack the kind of individuality that will really hook people. Black & White sounds more like a genetically engineered record than the organic work of a bunch of guys who really care about what they are doing." Billboard said, "Black & White, finds the five-piece indulging in guitar pop-driven love anthems, mixed with a splash of ’80s hair band flare." Sean Reid of Alter the Press! stated, "It's a record that has decent hooks and catchy lyrics but other than that, there isn't much to shout about." Kaj Roth of Melodic praised the tracks, "Inside of You", "Growing Up" and "Don't Stop Now" that shows "the best of the pop/rock." Alternative Addiction felt that the album was a lot better than Can't Stop, Won't Stop and remarked, "They sound more like a straight-forward rock band, mix that with the alternative country style of bands like Augustana and the Counting Crows and then toss in some of their pop punk roots and you've got The Maine on Black & White."

The album debuted at number 16 on the Billboard 200 and in its first week, sold 22,634 copies. Despite performing well commercially, O'Callaghan said of the album in retrospect, "in our collective eyes, we have the most to say about the record we care the least about." The album won the Alternative Press "Album of the Year" award in 2010.

== Track listing ==
All lyrics are written by John O'Callaghan; all music is composed by The Maine.

No.	Title	Length
1.	"Don't Stop Now"	3:36
2.	"Right Girl"	3:36
3.	"Growing Up"	4:00
4.	"Fuel to the Fire"	3:11
5.	"Inside of You"	3:50
6.	"Every Road"	3:37
7.	"Listen to Your Heart"	3:15
8.	"Saving Grace"	3:53
9.	"Give It to Me"	2:42
10.	"Color"	3:41
Total length:		35:22

Bonus tracks

Deluxe edition (digital bonus songs)
No.	Title	Length
11.	"Right Girl (acoustic)"	3:42
12.	"Inside of You (acoustic)"	3:46
Total length:		42:51

European Edition
No.	Title	Length
11.	"Untangle Me (B-side)"	3:20
12.	"Free (home recording)"	3:22
13.	"Book of Me and You (home recording)"	3:01
14.	"Whoever She Is (home recording)"	4:01
Total length:		49:06

== Personnel ==
Credits adapted from AllMusic.

Members

- John O'Callaghan – lead vocals, piano
- Jared Monaco – lead guitar
- Kennedy Brock – rhythm guitar, vocals
- Garrett Nickelsen – bass guitar
- Pat Kirch – drums, percussion

Production

- Craig Aaronson – A&R
- Keith Armstrong – Mixing assistant
- Howard Benson – producer
- Martin Briley – composer
- Dana Calitri – composer
- Chris Concepcion – technical assistance
- David Bassett – composer
- Paul DeCarli – digital editing
- Hatsukazu "Hatch" Inagaki – engineer
- Nik Karpen – mixing assistant
- Tim Kirch – art conception
- Chris Lord-Alge – mixing
- Dirk Mai – art conception, photography
- The Maine – art conception, composer, primary artist
- Zac Maloy – composer
- Jon Nicholson – drum technician
- Nina Ossoff – composer
- Donny Phillips – art conception, art direction, design
- Mike Plotnikoff – engineer
- Xavier Ramos – marketing
- Michito Sánchez – percussion
- Andrew Schubert – mixing
- Brad Townsend – mixing
- Marc VanGool – guitar, guitar technician
- Butch Walker – composer
- Gregg Wattenburg – composer
- Mark Weinburg – composer

== Charts ==
Chart performance for Black & White
Chart (2010)	Peak position
Canadian Albums (Billboard)	48
US Billboard 200	16
US Top Alternative Albums (Billboard)	11
US Top Rock Albums (Billboard)	6
