= I Only Want to Live Once =

Studio album by John the Ghost
- Released: February 12, 2021
- Recorded: 2020–2021
- Genre: Pop; rock
- Label: 8123
- Producer: Matt Keller

John the Ghost chronology
| Sincerely, John the Ghost (2016) | I Only Want to Live Once (2021) |

Singles from I Only Want to Live Once
- 1. "Rolled Down Window" Released: April 16, 2020; 2. "Live Once" Released: December 18, 2020; 3. "Drive" Released: January 15, 2021; 4. "The Patterns" Released: February 5, 2021

I Only Want to Live Once is the debut studio album by American indie rock singer John O'Callaghan under his alias John the Ghost. The album was released on February 12, 2021.

== Background ==
John O'Callaghan spoke about how the album came together and the title of the album.

"What started out as a single song, turned into 3, turned into 7, which all turned into my debut 9 song album. A friend of mine interpreted the title, I Only Want to Live Once, as a negative, when in reality I meant for it to highlight my lust for life. Live today because you live once."

O'Callaghan further explained that, "I view it more as a positive. You're only given one walk around the block and I felt like, a lot of songs that I've put out prior to this and before I fell in love, I was singing about that shit all the time. Singing about all these things that I wanted, and I think 'Live Once' is all about the idea that I obtained those things and why I am not as thankful as I should be?." Originally, O'Callaghan wanted to release the songs individually. However, blending a multitude of styles and influences resulted into an album with each track being recording within a day.

== Composition ==
Songs from I Only Want to Live Once were written by O'Callaghan, while production handled by Matt Keller and was recorded in nine days. O'Callaghan described the album as a "compilation of different vibes," pulling out his love for pop music. He had ideas for the songs for over four years, while others came about in February 2020. Originally, these songs were written for The Maine's next album but "weren't good enough" to make the cut. Eventually, the songs made its way onto I Only Want to Live Once. "Drive" was written in 2020 and was a "response to the pandemic." "Live Once" was a "last-minute idea" that "embodies the message" behind the album's title. The lead single, "Rolled Down Windows" is described as "melancholic sounding" with an upbeat and dance-pop influence. O'Callaghan called the song, "an open letter" to his past, with a sound most fans wouldn't expect.

== Release ==
On April 16, 2020, O'Callaghan released "Rolled Down Windows" as the lead single from I Only Want to Live Once. "Live Once" was released on December 18, 2020 as the second single from the album. The third single, "Drive" was released on January 15, 2021, with a music video directed by Lupe Bustos premiering the same day. The fourth single, "The Patterns" was released on February 5, 2021.

== Critical reception ==
Professional ratings
Review scores
| Source | Rating |
|---|---|
| Redbrick | 7/10 stars |

I Only Want to Live Once was met with positive reviews from music critics. Sam DeVotta of idobi Radio stated, "Each track brings its own unique sound, blending together to paint a portrait of what it's like to be human, with all our joys and sorrows and every feeling in between." She described the lead single "Rolled Down Window" as a "retro bop." She also praised O'Callaghan's vocals on the fourth track, "Drive". She ended off remarking, "There's no denying that O'Callaghan has a vital talent that makes his work so relatable." Sammy Andrews of Redbrick called the singles, "the clear standouts" on the album. She praised the lyrics on the opening track, "Live Once". She also complimented the, "driving drumbeat... that lifts up the melancholic tone" on the seventh track, "So So". However, she was critical on songs such as "Y" and "8" calling them "quite repetitive" and that "they seem a little bit too weighed down by the electric effects layered throughout them."

== Track listing ==
All tracks are written by John O'Callaghan.

| No. | Title | Length |
|---|---|---|
| 1. | "Live Once" | 2:41 |
| 2. | "Y" | 3:00 |
| 3. | "Not Life at All" | 3:36 |
| 4. | "Drive" | 3:51 |
| 5. | "The Patterns" | 2:36 |
| 6. | "Rolled Down Windows" | 3:03 |
| 7. | "So So" | 3:33 |
| 8. | "Here/Gone" (featuring De'Wayne) | 3:33 |
| 9. | "8" | 5:28 |

== Personnel ==
Credits for I Only Want to Live Once.

- John the Ghost – primary artist, lyricist, composer, co-producer
- Matt Keller – mastering, mixing, recording, producer
- Adam Simon – additional guitar
- De'Wayne – featured artist

== Release history ==
Release history for I Only Want to Live Once
| Region | Date | Format | Label | Ref. |
|---|---|---|---|---|
| Various | February 12, 2021 | Digital download | 8123 | |
| Various | February 12, 2021 | Vinyl | 8123 | |
