= Taylor Jardine =

American singer (born 1990)

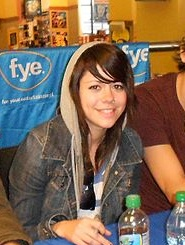

Background information
- Also known as: Tay Jardine
- Born: Taylor Kathleen Jardine; March 7, 1990 (age 36); Liberty, New York, U.S.
- Genres: Alternative rock; pop punk; pop rock
- Occupations: Singer; musician; songwriter
- Instruments: Vocals; keyboards; violin; guitar
- Years active: 2009–present

Taylor Kathleen "Tay" Jardine (born March 7, 1990) is an American musician, best known as the lead vocalist of the pop punk band We Are the In Crowd. During the band's hiatus from 2016-2019, Jardine released music under the name 'Sainte', along with two other members of We Are the In Crowd – Mike Ferri and Cameron Hurley. In 2024, Jardine released an independent self-titled EP under the name 'Tay Jardine'.

== Early life ==
Jardine was born to Ray and Robyn Jardine in Liberty, New York. Jardine is a triplet. She has a brother, Devin, and two sisters, Lindsey and Samantha. When she was young, her parents divorced, and her father moved to Florida. Her father died when she was 13 and inspired her to make music. In high school, Jardine played violin and was the lead vocalist in a band called Sofmoure.

== Career ==
=== We Are the In Crowd ===
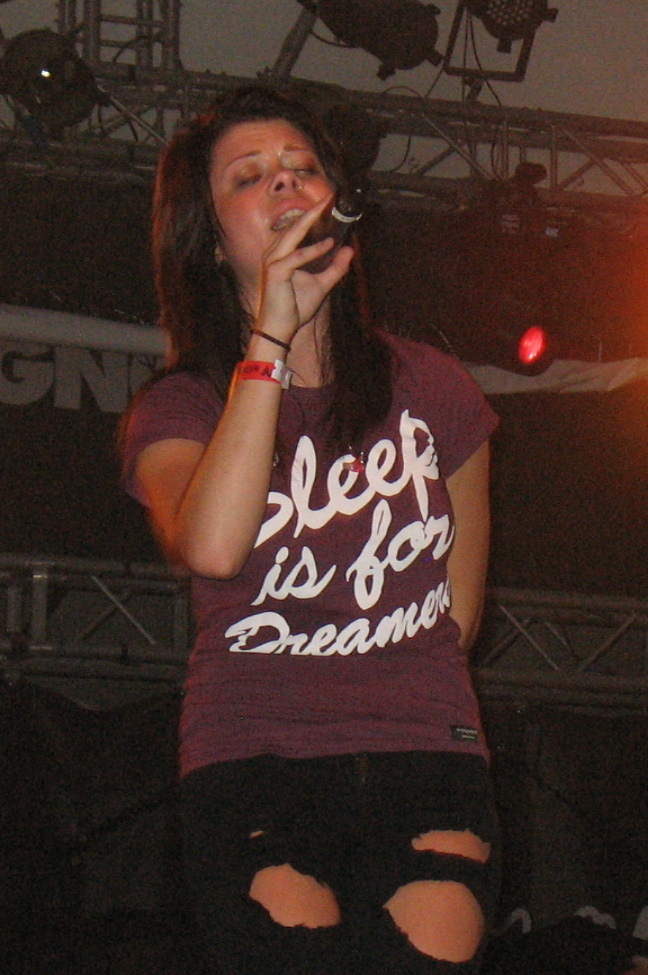
Jardine with We Are the In Crowd in 2013

In 2009, Jardine joined studio project, The In Crowd. The other members of the project were Jordan Eckes (vocals and guitar), Mike Ferri (bass), and Rob Chianelli (drums). The band released a digital sampler through Myspace and quickly gained a fanbase. Later that year, the band's Myspace was hacked by a former member. Jardine released a video on YouTube explaining the hacking to their fans, which garnered the attention of Hopeless Records. Shortly after, they were signed. After signing to the label, the band picked up Cameron Hurley (lead guitarist and backing vocals). The band changed their name after copyright problems with the Jamaican reggae band with the same name. Instead of changing their name completely, they added "We Are" to the original name. We Are The In Crowd has released an EP, Guaranteed to Disagree (2010), and two albums, Best Intentions (2011) and Weird Kids (2014).

=== Sainte ===
In February 2016, Jardine announced a new, unnamed musical project. The project would include We Are The In Crowd members Mike Ferri and Cameron Hurley. Jardine revealed that the project will be more "poppy" than We Are The In Crowd, and revealed in late September that the project would be called SAINTE. They released their debut single "Technicolor", with an accompanying music video; "With or Without Me" and "Eyes Are Open" followed as later singles. SAINTE announced on June 26, 2017, that their debut EP is called Smile, And Wave. It was released June 30, 2017.

=== Tay Jardine ===
On September 30, 2024, Jardine announced the release of the single "Bad News" under the name 'Tay Jardine', citing it as her first "solo single".

This initial release was followed by a second single, "Linear", on October 11, 2024, and a full EP titled "Tay Jardine" on October 25, 2024.

Jardine described the EP as 'DIY' and released it without a label, but credited We Are The In Crowd bandmates Rob Chianeli for production, engineering, and co-writing on the entire EP, and Jordan Eckes for co-writing the single "Bad News".

== Personal life ==
Jardine resides in New York.

In 2014, she partnered with Never Take It Off to start her own jewelry line. She also modelled for the clothing line Glamour Kills and had a signature bomber jacket there.

In 2020, Jardine shared news of her marriage on Instagram.

In September 2022, Jardine posted in honour of Achalasia Awareness Month, sharing her own diagnosis with the condition and news that she had undergone one procedure to reduce her symptoms earlier that year, and was due a second the following month.

In October 2024, Jardine revealed that she had divorced her ex-husband after coming to terms with the "empty feeling that I knew would only be filled by another woman as my life partner."

== Discography ==
=== As Sainte ===
==== EPs ====
- Smile, and Wave (2017)
- Bad Summer (2019)

==== Singles ====
- "Technicolor" (2016)
- "With Or Without Me" (2017)
- "Eyes Are Open" (2017)
- "Back 2 Me" (2019)
- "Everything Makes Me Sad" (2019)
- "Tough to Love" (2019)

=== Solo ===
==== EPs ====
- Tay Jardine (2024)

==== Singles ====
- "Bad News" (2024)
- "Linear" (2024)
