= Guaranteed to Disagree =

EP by We Are the In Crowd
- Released: June 8, 2010
- Genre: Pop punk, pop rock
- Length: 22:30
- Label: Hopeless Records
- Producer: Zack Odom, Kenneth Mount

We Are the In Crowd chronology
Guaranteed to Disagree (2010)	Best Intentions (2011)

Singles from Guaranteed to Disagree
- 1. "For the Win" Released: November 10, 2009; 2. "Never Be What You Want" Released: December 8, 2009; 3. "Lights Out" Released: April 13, 2010; 4. "Both Sides of the Story" Released: May 11, 2010

Guaranteed to Disagree is the first studio EP by American rock band We Are the In Crowd, released on June 8, 2010. The lead single, "For The Win", was released November 10, 2009. The second single, "Never Be What You Want", was released December 8, 2009. The third single, "Lights Out", was released April 13, 2010. The fourth single, "Both Sides Of The Story", was released May 11, 2010. Between late June and early August, the band performed on Warped Tour. A music video for "Lights Out" was filmed in New Jersey in late February 2011.

== Track listing ==
All songs written by We Are the In Crowd

No.	Title	Length
1.	"Carry Me Home"	2:55
2.	"Never Be What You Want" (Featuring Will Pugh of Cartel)	3:16
3.	"Both Sides Of The Story"	3:00
4.	"Lights Out"	3:22
5.	"We Need A Break"	3:12
6.	"For The Win"	3:21
7.	"Calendar Pages"	3:24
8.	"For the Win (Acoustic)"	3:29
Total length:		22:30

== Credits ==
We Are the In Crowd

- Taylor Jardine – Vocals
- Cameron Hurley – Guitar
- Jordan Eckes – Guitar, Vocals
- Mike Ferri – Bass
- Rob Chianelli – Drums

Production

- Zack Odom
- Kenneth Mount

== Chart performance ==
Guaranteed to Disagree peaked at #39 on the Billboard Heatseekers Albums.
