= Sandlot Heroes =

American pop rock band

- Also known as: SLH
- Origin: Bethlehem, Pennsylvania, US
- Genres: Pop rock
- Years active: 2005–2014
- Past members: Dan Kastelnik; Eamon Cunningham; Mike Kastelnik; Blaze Meyers; Joe DiTaconi; Ans Gibson; Dave Gibson; Chris Morrison; Jake Lare

Sandlot Heroes were an American pop rock band from Bethlehem, Pennsylvania. The band's singles, "Out of My Hands" and "Believer", were played regionally on Top 40 radio.

== History ==
The band self-released their first album, Pretend That We're Famous, on October 31, 2009. On April 15, 2012, the band released a five-song EP titled The Trace EP. On most of their recordings, the band has worked with producer Adam Richman in Coney Island, New York.

The band toured with Action Item in January 2011, Honor Society in November/December 2011, Hawthorne Heights in April 2012, Bowling for Soup in April/May 2012, Hollywood Ending in August 2012, and Yellowcard, We Are the In Crowd, and The Wonder Years in November/December 2012.

== Discography ==
Albums

- Pretend That We're Famous (2009)

EPs

- The Trace (2012)

== Band members ==
- Dan Kastelnik – lead vocals, guitar

== Music videos ==
- "Believer" (2010)
- "Freeway" (2011)
- "All in All" (2012)
