= American Dream (Rocky Loves Emily EP) =

American Dream EP

EP by Rocky Loves Emily
- Released: November 22, 2010
- Recorded: June–August 2010 in Seattle, Washington
- Genre: Indie rock, pop rock
- Length: 13:44
- Label: Tooth & Nail
- Producer: Casey Bates

Rocky Loves Emily chronology
What What What EP (2009)	American Dream EP (2010)	Secrets Don't Make Friends (2011)

American Dream is the second EP by pop rock band Rocky Loves Emily, released on November 22, 2010, by Tooth & Nail Records. It was produced by Casey Bates and is the follow-up to the band's independent debut, the What What What EP.

== Background and recording ==
In early 2010, Rocky Loves Emily was on Copeland's farewell tour. At a Seattle spot on the tour, an A&R executive from Tooth & Nail Records spotted them, subsequently bringing them to the attention of the label and getting them signed. While waiting for Tooth & Nail to officially announce the signing, the band spent the summer of 2010 recording demos for the inevitable album in Michigan, at a cabin owned by drummer Pete Kalinowski's family. At the end of the summer, Tooth & Nail flew the band back to Seattle to record with producer Casey Bates.

== Release and promotion ==
The EP was released on November 22, 2010. The release was preceded by the lead single "Clueless", which was accompanied by a music video depicting the band holding auditions to find a lead singer.

== Reception ==
Professional ratings
Review scores
Source	Rating
Jesus Freak Hideout	3.5/5 stars
AbsolutePunk	66%

American Dream received largely positive critical reception. Samantha Schaumberg of Jesus Freak Hideout deemed it a "more than satisfactory first release": "Very little new ground is explored musically, but Rock Loves Emily's polished sound definitely makes them a worthy competitor in the genre." AbsolutePunk's Ryan Gardner found the record's flaws to be "mainly a lack of depth or innovation," as well as the lyrics "[pulling] the record down incalculably, as well, with nearly every track being about girls." Nevertheless, he concluded that "there’s no denying how ridiculously catchy each track sounds...if these six guys can grow and mature with their music and lyrics – perhaps taking hints from many of T&N’s other bands – they definitely will have a bright future."

== Track listing ==
1. "American Dream" – 2:37
2. "Clueless" – 2:47
3. "See Her Again" – 2:39
4. "Name Of The Game" – 2:49
5. "There's A Word For You" – 2:52

== Personnel ==
- Brandon Ellis – vocals
- Sean Kick – guitar
- Wood Simmons – — bass
- Andrew Stevens – guitar
- Stephen Hull — keyboards
- Pete Kalinowski – drums
- Casey Bates – production
