= They Chose China =

Documentary film about Korean War POWs

- Directed by: Shui-bo Wang
- Produced by: Claude Bonin; Joanne Carriere; Eric Michel; Veronique Rabutaeu; Paul Saadoun
- Edited by: Ragnar Van Leyden
- Music by: Peter Chase
- Production companies: National Film Board of Canada; 13 Productions; ARTE
- Distributed by: Icarus Films; Canadian Broadcasting Corporation
- Release dates: April 5, 2006 (United States); November 2, 2007 (Canada)
- Running time: 52 minutes
- Country: Canada
- Language: English

They Chose China is a 2006 documentary film directed by Shui-bo Wang about the twenty-one American prisoners of war who opted to stay in China following the Korean War in 1953. The film won the Golden Gate Award at the 2006 San Francisco Film Festival.

== Summary ==
They Chose China is a story about twenty-one American POWs who, after the end of the Korean War in 1953, chose to stay in China instead of returning to the United States.

== Release ==
They Chose China premiered at the Chicago Asian American Showcase on April 5, 2006, and was screened at the Vancouver Asian Film Festival on November 2, 2007. It was broadcast by CBC Television on April 7, 2008.

== Reception ==
They Chose China won the REMI Award at the 2006 WorldFest-Houston International Film Festival and the Golden Gate Award at the 2006 San Francisco Film Festival.
