= Weird Kids =

Studio album by We Are the In Crowd
- Released: February 18, 2014
- Recorded: 2013–2014
- Genre: Pop punk, pop rock, alternative rock
- Length: 31:52
- Label: Hopeless
- Producer: John Feldmann

We Are the In Crowd chronology
Best Intentions (2011)	Weird Kids (2014)

Singles from Weird Kids
- 1. "Attention" Released: August 20, 2013; 2. "The Best Thing (That Never Happened)" Released: December 3, 2013; 3. "Long Live the Kids" Released: January 19, 2014; 4. "Windows in Heaven" Released: January 26, 2014; 5. "Manners" Released: February 2, 2014

Weird Kids is the second studio album by American rock band We Are the In Crowd.

== Production ==
Weird Kids was produced, mixing, and recorded by John Feldmann. Tommy English and Zakk Cervini did additional production and mixing; Joe Gastwirt mastered the album.

== Composition ==
"Attention", according to Taylor Jardine, "is about friendship, and needing friends to help you see it’s okay to change for the better."

== Release ==
On August 20, 2013, "Attention" was made available for streaming. In addition, a lyric video was also released. Later that month, the group performed three headlining shows in the UK, and appeared at the Reading and Leeds Festivals. Following this, they supported New Found Glory for a few shows in Europe. On December 3, Weird Kids was announced for release in February 2014. In addition, the album's track listing and artwork were revealed. A music video was released for "The Best Thing (That Never Happened)" on December 10, directed by Mark Staubach. A behind-the-scenes video followed five days later. On January 20, 2014, "Long Live the Kids" was made available for streaming. On January 27, "Windows in Heaven" was made available for streaming. In January and February, the group went on a UK tour with Neck Deep and Save Your Breathe.

"Manners" was made available for streaming on February 3. Weird Kids was made available for streaming via MTV on February 11, before being released on February 18 through independent label Hopeless Records. The group then embarked on a US tour between February and April, with William Beckett, Set It Off, State Champs and Candy Hearts. In April and May, the band supported Mayday Parade on their So Devastating, It’s Unnatural Tour in the US. Also in May, the band appeared at Slam Dunk Festival in the UK. Between June and August, the band went on Warped Tour. "Manners" was released to radio on August 4. On September 22, a music video was released for the track. The band supported New Found Glory on the Glamour Kills tour in October and November.

== Reception ==
Professional ratings
Aggregate scores
Source	Rating
Metacritic	67/100
Review scores
Source	Rating
Allmusic	3/5 stars
Alter The Press!	4/5
The Observer	1/5 stars

The album was included at number 45 on Rock Sound's "Top 50 Albums of the Year" list. The album was included at number 22 on Kerrang!'s "The Top 50 Rock Albums Of 2014" list. "The Best Thing (That Never Happened)" was nominated for Best Single at the Kerrang! Awards.

== Track listing ==
All songs written by We Are the In Crowd, additional composition by John Feldmann.

No.	Title	Length
1.	"Long Live the Kids"	4:11
2.	"The Best Thing (That Never Happened)"	2:51
3.	"Manners"	3:05
4.	"Come Back Home"	2:56
5.	"Attention"	3:22
6.	"Dreaming Out Loud"	3:06
7.	"Remember (To Forget You)"	3:04
8.	"Don't You Worry"	2:44
9.	"Windows in Heaven"	3:26
10.	"Reflections"	2:41
Total length:		31:52

Best Buy bonus tracks
No.	Title	Length
11.	"Perfect Reason"	3:06
12.	"Waiting"	2:39
Total length:		37:37

== Personnel ==
We Are the In Crowd

- Taylor Jardine – lead vocals, backing vocals
- Jordan Eckes – guitar, co-lead vocals (3–7, 10, 11), backing vocals
- Mike Ferri – bass
- Cameron Hurley – guitar
- Rob Chianelli – drums

Additional musicians

- Tommy English – programming, backing vocals
- Zakk Cervini – backing vocals
- Alex Goot – additional piano (1)
- Tom Schleiter – additional guitars (2, 4)

Production and design

- John Feldmann – producer, mixing, recording
- Tommy English – engineer, additional production, mixing
- Zakk Cervini – 2nd engineer, additional production, mixing
- Joe Gastwirt – mastering
- Kevin Andersson – artwork, layout
- Matthew Reid – additional artwork

== Charts ==
Chart (2014)	Peak position
US Billboard 200	29
US Alternative Albums	8
US Independent Albums	5
US Rock Albums	9
