= American Dreaming =

American Dreaming may refer to:

- "American Dreaming", a song by the Dead Can Dance from Toward the Within
- "American Dreaming", a song by Jay-Z from American Gangster
- Master of My Make-Believe or American Dreaming, an album by Santigold
- American Dreaming a song by Sierra Ferrell from Trail of Flowers

== See also ==
- American Dream (disambiguation)
