= James Veneris =

United States Army soldier

- Born: 1922; Vandergrift, Pennsylvania, U.S.
- Died: 2001 (aged 78–79); Jinan, Shandong, China
- Military career
- Allegiance: United States (until 1953); China (Defector; 1953–2004)
- Branch: United States Army
- Service years: Unknown–1953 (defected)
- Rank: Private
- Nickname: Lao Wen (老温)
- Conflicts: World War II: Pacific War; Korean War

James Veneris
- Simplified Chinese: 詹姆斯·乔治·温纳瑞斯
- Traditional Chinese: 詹姆斯·喬治·溫納瑞斯
Transcriptions
Standard Mandarin
- Hanyu Pinyin: Zhānmǔsī Qiáozhì Wēnnàruìsī

Lao Wen
- Simplified Chinese: 老温
- Traditional Chinese: 老溫
- Literal meaning: Old Wen
Transcriptions
Standard Mandarin
- Hanyu Pinyin: Lǎo Wēn

James George Veneris (March 30, 1922 – December 18, 2001) was an American soldier during the Korean War who was captured by the Chinese and was one of 21 American soldiers at the start of the armistice who decided they would rather stay in China than return to the United States.

== Early life and education ==
James Veneris was born into a Greek immigrant family, in Vandergrift, Pennsylvania, and grew up in Detroit, Michigan. He dropped out of high school and for the most part was involved in petty crime to survive. When given the option of joining the U.S. Armed Forces or going to jail, he decided to enter the Army in hopes of getting education and learning a trade.

== Career ==
Veneris had served in the South Pacific during World War II and said he re-enlisted because he couldn't find anything else to do and hoped Army life would provide security.

=== Defection ===
At the end of military action, all POWs in Korea were given the option by their captors of returning to their home countries or remaining with the Chinese. Veneris elected to stay in China since during his time in the prison camp he was treated well and learned Chinese. He was promised employment and education if he remained in China, so he decided to remain.

=== Life in China ===
Veneris and fellow former POW Howard Gayle Adams stayed in Jinan through the turmoil of the Cultural Revolution, sheltered by their factory co-workers and an announcement by Premier Zhou Enlai calling them "international freedom fighters". In 1963, he was allowed to study at the People's University of China. After graduation, Veneris returned to the same factory. His first Chinese wife died from lung disease after ten years of marriage. In 1967, Veneris married a Chinese divorcee. Together they had 2 children. In 1977, he became an English professor at Shandong University. Veneris returned to the United States twice, first in 1976 to celebrate the Bicentennial and again sometime in the late 1990s. He was one of the subjects of the 2005 documentary They Chose China which was directed by Shui-Bo Wang and produced by the National Film Board of Canada.

== Personal life ==
After he chose to live in China, the U.S. Army gave Veneris a dishonorable discharge and refused to provide back pay for his time in prison camp. The Chinese gave him a stipend and moved him to Shandong province, where he was given a job in a state-run pulp factory in Jinan that turned discarded cloth shoes into toilet paper for export to Hong Kong. He adopted the Chinese name Lao Wen (老温). Veneris had 2 daughters and 4 sons who were raised in China and 1 biological son and 1 biological daughter moved to the United States in the 1990s. (The other children were born to his wife and her ex-husband).

== Military awards and decorations ==
During his time in the Army, James received the following awards for his service

Badge	Combat Infantryman Badge with star denoting second award		
1st row	Bronze Star Medal		Prisoner of War Medal
2nd Row	Good Conduct Medal	American Defense Service Medal	American Campaign Medal
2nd row	Asiatic-Pacific Campaign Medal with at least one campaign star	World War II Victory Medal	National Defense Service Medal
3rd row	Korean Service Medal with one campaign star	United Nations Service Medal Korea	Korean War Service Medal
Unit awards	Korean Presidential Unit Citation		

== Death ==
Veneris died in Jinan in 2001 and is buried in a cemetery in the outskirts of that city.

== See also ==
- List of American and British defectors in the Korean War
- Samuel David Hawkins
- Korean War
- Greek Americans
