= Samuel David Hawkins =

American defector to China

- Born: August 11, 1933 (age 93); Oklahoma City, Oklahoma
- Military career
- Allegiance: United States (1950–1953)
- Branch: United States Army
- Service years: 1950–1953 (defected)
- Rank: Private
- Conflicts: Korean War

Samuel David Hawkins (born August 11, 1933) was an American serviceman who became the youngest of the American defectors of the Korean War. Hawkins was one of twenty-two American and British servicemen to defect to China after the conclusion of the war in 1953. Hawkins returned to the United States in 1957.

== Early life and Wartime Experience ==
Hawkins was born in Oklahoma City, Oklahoma. His father, Clayton O. Hawkins, whom Hawkins says he had an unhappy relationship with during his childhood, had served in World War II. He enlisted in the U.S. Army at the age of 16. He served in the Korean War and was captured and made a prisoner of war by the Chinese People's Volunteer Army troops. He chose to remain in China after the signing of the 1953 Korean Armistice Agreement, one of twenty-two American and British servicemen to do so. While in China, he studied politics at the People's University of China in Beijing, and later worked in Wuhan as a mechanic. Hawkins was featured in Virginia Pasley's 1955 book 21 Stayed: The Story of the American GIs Who Chose Communist China—Who They Were and Why They Stayed. His father died in a fire in Tuskahoma, Oklahoma, while Hawkins was in a prisoner-of-war camp in China. In 1954 Hawkins was dishonorably discharged from the U.S. Army. In 1956 he married a White Russian woman named Tanya who had grown up in a French convent in China and worked at the Soviet embassy in Beijing.

Hawkins was permitted to speak with the foreign press in China. His interviewers included journalist William Worthy, as well as correspondents from Reuters and Look magazine. As early as June 1956, Hawkins indicated his desire to return home in an interview with a British journalist. Finally, in late February 1957, he took a train from Guangzhou to the border with British-ruled Hong Kong and departed mainland China by walking across a rail-bridge to the British territory. Upon his arrival in Hong Kong he was met by U.S. Vice Consul S.M. Backe, who questioned Hawkins and issued him a one-way passport to the United States. He stated that the major motivation for his departure from China was the way the Soviets had suppressed the Hungarian Revolution of 1956, which turned him off Communism. He was the seventh ex-U.S. Army soldier to come back after defecting to China.

== Return to the United States ==
Neither the U.S. nor the Chinese government provided Hawkins with money for his return trip to North America, but a wealthy Oklahoma City oilman, M. H. Champion, paid for Hawkins' ticket after Hawkins' mother, Carley Sallee Jones, made a public plea for assistance. Champion also promised Hawkins a job after his return to America. Hawkins landed in Los Angeles on March 2, 1957, after having been gone for more than three years. On June 23, 1957, he was interviewed by Mike Wallace, and explained his decision to defect and his motivations for eventually returning to the United States. The following week, Wallace interviewed World War II veteran and Medal of Honor recipient Charles E. Kelly. Wallace described how Hawkins had been "accepted back into his community," and asked Kelly, "How do you think that we should treat U.S. Army turncoats?" Kelly responded:

He's a human being; we should treat him the same as we treat any other G.I. In my opinion, I think the boy deserves it; he just got off on the wrong track. And I know for a fact when he went to Korea, he didn't know whether he was going to come back or he was going to stay there. So, maybe he got a little scared when he was captured. Maybe he was pressured, tortured. I don't think it's the boy's own fault. No doubt at the time—I never seen him or never met him—no doubt he was young and he wasn't trained properly.

In June 1957, it was announced that Hawkins' wife Tanya would arrive in Hong Kong, with the intention of traveling to the United States to be with her husband. She arrived in the U.S. in the fall of 1957. She claimed that after her husband left China, she lost her job there.

After his return to the United States, David Hawkins worked in Oklahoma City as a salesman in an oil firm. In 2001, the United Press and Associated Press reported that Hawkins had studied to become a physician's assistant, was married, and had children.

== See also ==
- James Veneris
