= John O'Callaghan (singer) =

American singer-songwriter and musician

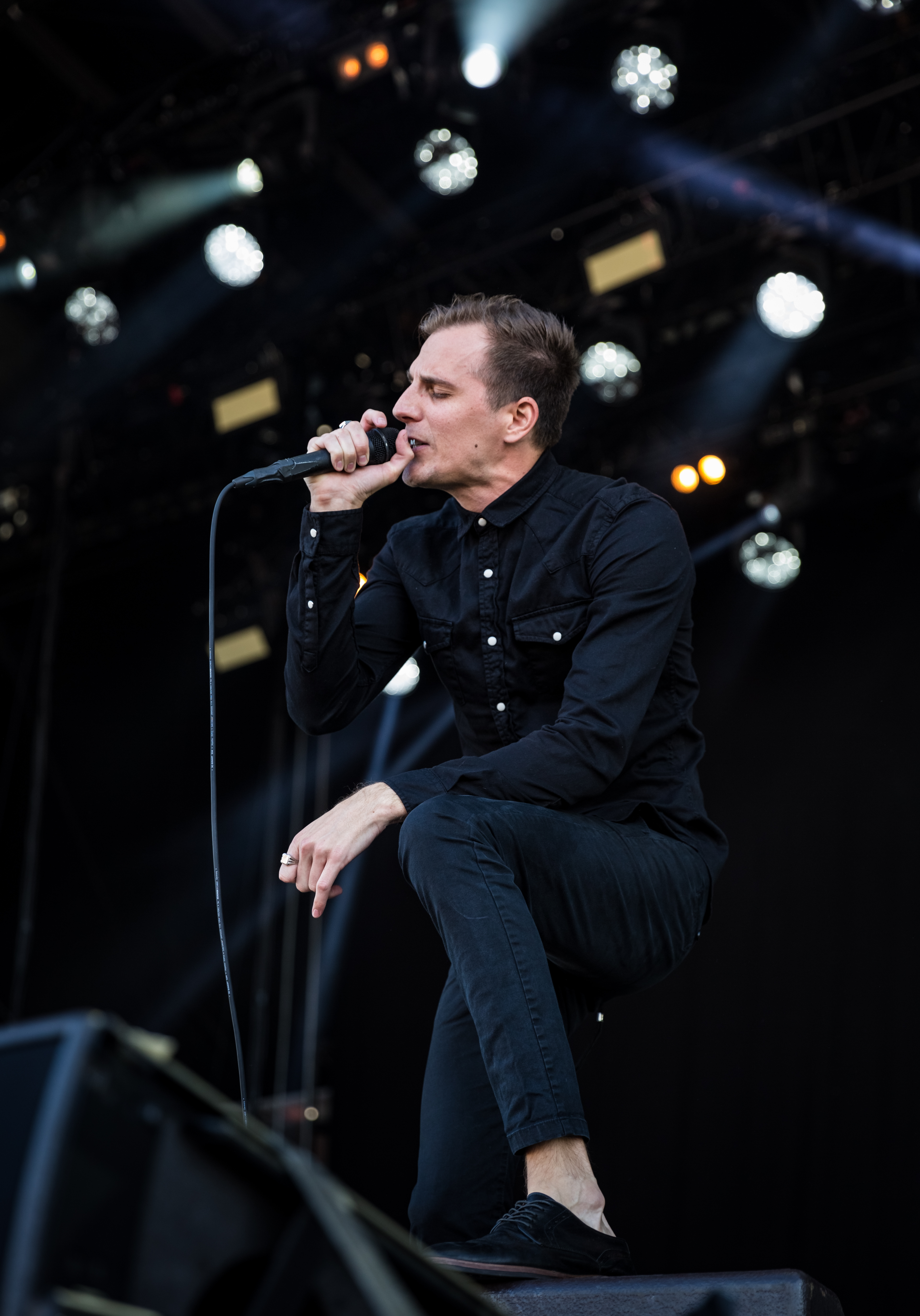
- O'Callaghan performing at the 2018 Rock am Ring

Background information
- Also known as: John the Ghost
- Born: John Cornelius O'Callaghan V August 4, 1988 (age 38); Phoenix, Arizona, United States
- Occupations: Singer-songwriter; musician
- Years active: 2007–present
- Musical career
- Genres: Pop punk; indie pop; indie rock
- Instruments: Vocals; guitar; keyboards
- Label: 8123
- Member of: The Maine
- Website: www.johntheghost.com

John Cornelius O'Callaghan V (born August 4, 1988) is an American singer-songwriter and musician. He is best known for being the lead vocalist, guitarist and pianist of American rock band The Maine which he joined in 2007. He debuted a solo project under the name John the Ghost in 2016.

== Early life ==
John O'Callaghan was born and raised in Phoenix, Arizona. He attended Arizona State University for two semesters before dropping out to join American rock band The Maine. Before turning to music, O'Callaghan played baseball.

== Career ==
O'Callaghan began his career by auditioning for The Maine with no prior vocal experience. The group have released ten studio albums including You Are OK that reached number one on the Billboard Independent Albums chart. They were featured in various Punk Goes Pop compilation albums. The band won the "Power of Music Award" in 2017 and O'Callaghan spoke about winning the award stating, "For me, awards are never something you should think about unless it's directly impacting you as far as being voted by the people that dig what you do, but for me it's really special because you guys are acknowledging the people that make it all possible for us."

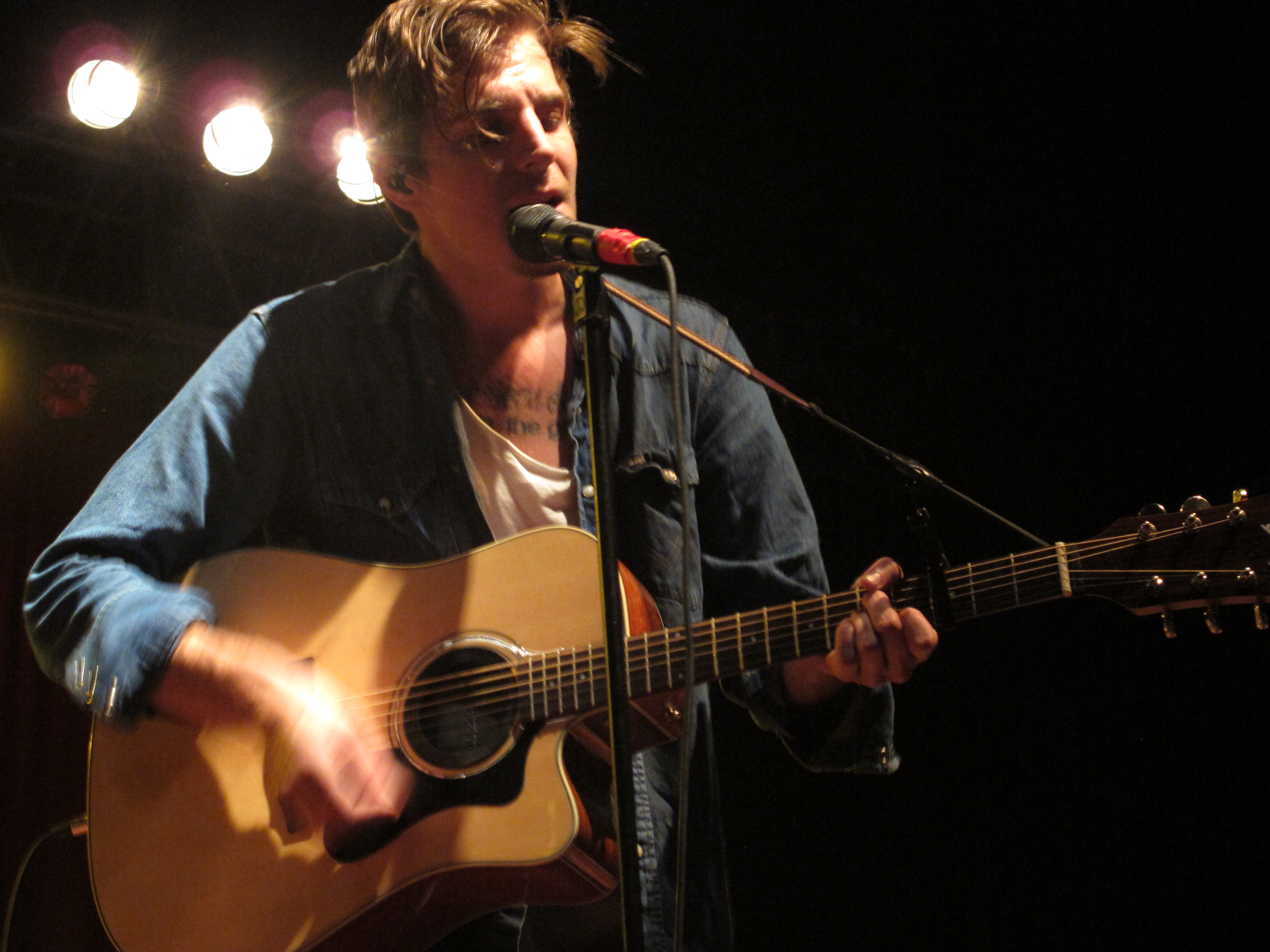
O'Callaghan performing with The Maine in 2012

In 2008, O'Callaghan was featured on the song "Just Another One" by A Rocket to the Moon from their EP, Greetings From.... In 2011, he was featured on Arkells' "On Paper", from their album, Michigan Left. In 2014, he formed a side project along with guitarist Jared Monaco called Eagles in Drag. Their self-titled EP was released in 2014 and peaked at number 35 on the US Heatseekers Albums chart. O'Callaghan co-wrote and provided additional vocals for the song "Long Way Home" on Nick Santino's debut studio album, Big Skies.

In 2016, he began a solo project under the moniker John the Ghost releasing his first single titled, "Sour Grapes" on April 12, 2016. He released his debut extended play, Sincerely, John the Ghost on April 29, 2016. In 2020, O'Callaghan returned to the solo project and released his comeback single "Rolled Down Window". On January 15, 2021, he released his single "Drive" and announced the upcoming release of his debut album, I Only Want to Live Once. Days before the release of his album, he released another single "The Patterns" that featured other previous singles such as "Drive" and "Live Once". O'Callaghan released his debut album, I Only Want to Live Once on February 12, 2021.

In 2017, he was nominated at the Alternative Press Music Awards for "Best Vocalist" but lost to Lynn Gunn of Pvris. O'Callaghan has worked as a composer and songwriter for the band Grayscale. In 2010, O'Callaghan collaborated with photographer Dirk Mai in the creation of Exaltation, a book containing 15 poems written by O'Callaghan complemented by nine accompanying photographs by Mai. He also released a book of poetry titled Sincerely, John The Ghost in 2016 to accompany his solo EP of the same name. In 2024, he released a book titled The Highly Unqualified Hand-Guide To Keeping Plants Alive, consisting of poems, ideas and advice.

In 2020, O'Callaghan was featured in the Mayday Parade's cover of "I Want to Hold Your Hand" by The Beatles. In 2023, O'Callaghan was featured as a guest artist on the track "All Caps" by Weathers. O'Callaghan also co-produced the track alongside Jason Suwito. He produced the track "I Should Call My Friends" by Hey Violet in October 2023. He released the single "A Monday" on October 6, 2025.

== Personal life ==
O'Callaghan married Megan Harder in October 2020. The couple welcomed a daughter in November of the following year and a son in December 2023. As of 2015, O'Callaghan resides in Chandler, Arizona.

== Musical influences ==
O'Callaghan cites Arizona as his inspiration for music. He stated, "I think Arizona has a heavy effect on everything that I write about. Having the experience of being able to leave Arizona and see other parts of the world made me really appreciate what I have here — the sunsets, the weather and, of course, family and friends. It’s really just a long way of saying that I love Arizona and I feel like I was very fortunate to have been born here and to live here."

== Discography ==
with The Maine

- Can't Stop Won't Stop (2008)
- Black & White (2010)
- Pioneer (2011)
- Forever Halloween (2013)
- American Candy (2015)
- Lovely Little Lonely (2017)
- You Are OK (2019)
- XOXO: From Love and Anxiety in Real Time (2021)
- The Maine (2023)
- Joy Next Door (2026)

with Eagles in Drag

- Eagles in Drag (2014)

=== Albums ===
List of studio albums with selected details
Title	Album details
I Only Want to Live Once	Released: February 12, 2021; Label: 8123 Records; Format: Digital download, vinyl

=== Extended plays ===
List of extended plays with selected chart positions
Title	Details	Peak chart positions		
Title	Details	US Alt.	US Rock	US Heat.
Sincerely, John the Ghost	Released: April 29, 2016; Label: 8123 Records; Format: CD digital download	25	40	9

=== Singles ===
List of singles as lead artist
Title	Year	Album
"Sour Grapes"	2016	Sincerely, John the Ghost
"Rolled Down Window"	2020	I Only Want to Live Once
"Live Once"	2020	I Only Want to Live Once
"Drive"	2021	I Only Want to Live Once
"The Patterns"	2021	I Only Want to Live Once
"Young at Heart"	2022	Non-album singles
"Lately" (featuring Worry Club)	2022	Non-album singles
"A Monday"	2025	Non-album singles

=== As featured artist ===
List of singles as featured artist, with selected chart positions, showing year released and album name
Title	Year	Peak chart positions	Album
Title	Year	US Alt.	Album
"ALL CAPS" (Weathers featuring John the Ghost)	2023	8	Are We Having Fun?
"—" denotes a recording that did not chart or was not released in that territory.

=== Other appearances ===
Title	Year	Artist	Album	Notes
"Just Another One"	2008	A Rocket to the Moon	Greetings From...	Vocals
"On Paper"	2011	Arkells	Michigan Left	Vocals
"Long Way Home"	2014	Nick Santino	Big Skies	Additional vocals, songwriter
"In Violet"	2019	Grayscale	Nella Vita	Songwriter
"I Want to Hold Your Hand"	2020	Mayday Parade	N/A	Vocals
"ALL CAPS"	2023	Weathers	Are We Having Fun?	Vocals, co-producer
"I Should Call My Friends"	2023	Hey Violet	N/A	Producer

== Awards and nominations ==
Year	Association	Category	Nominated work	Result	Ref.
2017	Alternative Press Music Awards	Best Vocalist	Himself	Nominated	
