= 2011 in American music =

The following is a list of notable events and releases that happened in 2011 in music in the United States.

== Events ==
=== January ===
- 24 – Original Adema vocalist Mark Chavez leaves the band for the second time.
- 29 – Britney Spears's Hold It Against Me debuts at #1 on US Billboard Hot 100, making Spears the second artist to have more than one single to debut at no. 1, behind Mariah Carey. She also being the third female artist, behind Cher, Madonna and Janet Jackson to top the Hot 100 in three decades, as well as the seventh artist overall.

=== February ===
- 11 – Lady Gaga released "Born This Way" the first single off her new album of the same name. It became the fastest iTunes single at the time. It later went on to remain number 1 on the Billboard Hot 100 for 6 consecutive weeks, as well as the 1,000th number-one single in chart's history.
- 13 – The 53rd Annual Grammy Awards were held at Staples Center in Los Angeles, California. Lady Antebellum win five awards, including both Record of the Year and Song of the Year for "Need You Now". Arcade Fire's The Suburbs wins Album of the Year, while Esperanza Spalding wins Best New Artist making her the first jazz singer to win this award.
- 14 – Justin Bieber released his second remix album Never Say Never: The Remixes, three days after the release of his first movie Justin Bieber: Never Say Never.

=== March ===
- 11 – Kyuss began their reunion tour in Europe under the moniker Kyuss Lives.
- 15 – Former rapper Nate Dogg dies at age 41 from strokes.

=== April ===
- 3 – LCD Soundsystem played their final show at New York City's Madison Square Garden.
  - The 46th Academy of Country Music Awards took place at the MGM Grand Garden Arena in Las Vegas.
- 20 – TV on the Radio bassist Gerard Smith dies of lung cancer at the age of 36, just nine days after the band released their fourth album, Nine Types of Light.

=== May ===
- 12 – Katy Perry, with her fourth single from Teenage Dream, "E.T.", becomes the only artist in history to spend 52 consecutive weeks in the top ten of the Billboard Hot 100.
- 23 – Lady Gaga released her sophomore studio album, Born This Way. It sold 524,000 copies on its first day, and one million copies on its first week, making Gaga the first person to do that.
- 25 – Scotty McCreery is crowned winner of the tenth season of American Idol. Lauren Alaina is named runner-up.

=== June ===
- 18 – Clarence Clemons, Bruce Springsteen's longtime saxophonist for the E Street Band dies at the age of 69.
- 28 – Taking Back Sunday released their self-titled fifth album, which was the band's first album to feature their original lineup since their 2002 debut, Tell All Your Friends.
  - Limp Bizkit released their first studio album in eight years, Gold Cobra. It was the first album with the band's original lineup since 2000's Chocolate Starfish and the Hot Dog Flavored Water.
- 29 – Javier Colon won the inaugural season of The Voice. Dia Frampton was named runner-up. Vicci Martinez and Beverly McClellan was declared third and fourth place.

=== July ===
- 17 – Cheap Trick is unharmed after a stage collapses during a performance at the Cisco Bluesfest in Ottawa, Ontario, Canada.
- 19 – Cold released their first studio album in six years, Superfiction.

=== August ===
- 8 – JAY Z and Kanye West release their highly anticipated collaboration album, Watch the Throne.
- 15 – Blink-182 started their 20th Anniversary Tour. The tour visited Canada in 2011, the United States and Europe in 2012 and Australia in 2013.
- 27 – "Last Friday Night (T.G.I.F.)" by Katy Perry becomes the fifth single from the album Teenage Dream to reach #1 on the Billboard Hot 100, tying Michael Jackson's record for the most singles from one album to do so. She is the second artist and only woman in history to achieve this.
- 29 – Red Hot Chili Peppers released their first studio album in five years, I'm with You. It was also their first album with guitarist Josh Klinghoffer.

=== September ===
- 2 – It was announced that drummer Mike Pedicone was kicked out of My Chemical Romance due to Pedicone stealing from the band. No charges were pressed.
- 17 – With Katy Perry's fifth single from Teenage Dream, "Last Friday Night (T.G.I.F.)", she completed 69 consecutive weeks inside the top ten, more than any artist in history.
- 21 – Rock and Roll Hall of Famers R.E.M. disband after 31 years together. They played their last show in 2008.
- 24 – "I Wanna Go" by Britney Spears became Spears's 21st top-forty single, the third-highest female total since her first week on the chart on November 21, 1998, and only behind Taylor Swift with 27 and Rihanna with 22. It also broke the record for longest duration between the first and last # 1 on the pop chart.
- 27 – Blink-182 released their sixth studio album Neighborhoods. This is the first album they recorded together since their indefinite hiatus in 2005. It debuted at number 2 on the Billboard 200. This was their last album with Tom DeLonge until he returned to the band in 2022.

=== October ===
- 8 – Tony Bennett's Duets II debuted at No. 1 on the Billboard 200, becoming the oldest male with a No. 1 solo album, at age 85.

=== November ===
- 1 – Justin Bieber released his first Christmas album Under the Mistletoe and it became an instant success becoming Bieber's third consecutive number-one album and third platinum-selling album in the United States following Never Say Never: The Remixes earlier in the year
- 9 – The 2011 Country Music Association Awards took place at the Bridgestone Arena in Nashville, Tennessee.
- 7 – David Lynch released his first studio album in ten years, Crazy Clown Time. It is the first album credited solo to Lynch; he had previously released to collaborative albums.
- 21 – Pentatonix wins Season 3 of NBC's The Sing-Off, beginning their rise in popularity.

=== December ===
- 6 – Korn's tenth studio album, The Path of Totality, debuts at number 10 on the Billboard 200 with 55,000 copies sold in its first week. This album marks the beginning of a new direction for nu metal, with artists like Skrillex and many more contributing to the album with dubstep and more electronic sounds.

== Bands formed ==
- Adrenaline Mob
- Against the Current
- Art of Anarchy
- Banks & Steelz
- Big Talk
- Charly Bliss
- Chris Robinson Brotherhood
- Crosses
- Deap Vally
- DIIV
- Downtown Boys
- Empress Of
- Foxing
- A Great Big World
- Houndmouth
- The Internet
- The Interrupters
- McCafferty
- The Milk Carton Kids
- Modern Baseball
- The Moth & The Flame
- MS MR
- The Neighbourhood
- Ninja Sex Party
- Nothing
- Pentatonix
- Pistol Annies
- Poliça
- The Record Company
- Rozwell Kid
- Speedy Ortiz
- SuperHeavy
- Tremonti
- Waxahatchee
- Young Buffalo
- Your Favorite Martian

== Bands reformed ==
- Bad Meets Evil
- Ben Folds Five
- Blink-182
- Evanescence
- Gym Class Heroes
- Dispatch
- Grant Lee Buffalo
- Live
- O-Town
- System of a Down
- Five Iron Frenzy

== Bands on hiatus ==
- Atreyu
- The Black Eyed Peas
- Disturbed
- Good Charlotte
- Idiot Pilot
- Iglu & Hartly
- Innerpartysystem
- Jonas Brothers
- Nevermore
- Sonic Youth
- The Spill Canvas
- Story of the Year
- Thrice
- Thursday
- Velvet Revolver
- Tally Hall

== Bands disbanded ==
- The Academy Is...
- Anal Cunt
- Bad City
- Big Star
- The Bravery
- Buckner & Garcia
- Course of Nature
- The Depreciation Guild
- Double Dagger
- Draco and the Malfoys
- The Famine
- The Graduate
- Haste the Day
- LCD Soundsystem
- Monty Are I
- Nick Jonas & the Administration
- One Day as a Lion
- Pontytail
- P.S. Eliot
- pureNRG
- R.E.M.
- Rilo Kiley
- The Takeover UK
- Thelonious Monster
- Trachtenburg Family Slideshow Players
- The Von Bondies
- The White Stripes

== Albums released ==
=== January ===
Date	Album	Artist
11	Fuckin' A	Anal Cunt
11	Outside	Tapes 'n Tapes
11	Rehab: The Overdose	Lecrae
11	Showroom of Compassion	Cake
11	Thank You, Happy Birthday	Cage the Elephant
17	Decoder	Decoder
17	Live on Ten Legs (live)	Pearl Jam
18	Hard Times and Nursery Rhymes	Social Distortion
18	Hi-Five Soup!	The Aquabats
18	The King Is Dead	The Decemberists
18	Tear the Fences Down	Eulogies
21	Amanda Palmer Goes Down Under	Amanda Palmer
21	What If...	Mr. Big
25	Gotta Get Up Now	Roger Miret and the Disasters
25	Mine Is Yours	Cold War Kids
25	There Are Rules	The Get Up Kids

=== February ===
Date	Album	Artist
1	Until We Have Faces	Red
8	California Fade	Anna Waronker
8	Sever the Wicked Hand	Crowbar
8	Tao of the Dead	...And You Will Know Us by the Trail of Dead
15	Angels & Devils	Sarah Darling
15	Identity on Fire	A Skylit Drive
15	Justice	Rev Theory
15	The People's Key	Bright Eyes
15	Runner Runner	Runner Runner
15	To Hell with God	Deicide
22	Beast	DevilDriver
22	D.R.U.G.S.	Destroy Rebuild Until God Shows
22	The End of the World Party	I See Stars
22	Killing Time	Bayside
22	Rugged Road	The Aggrolites

=== March ===
Date	Album	Artist
1	Alexander	Alex Ebert
1	Forever the Sickest Kids	Forever the Sickest Kids
1	Going Out in Style	Dropkick Murphys
8	Civilian	Wye Oak
8	Collapse into Now	R.E.M.
8	Downtown Battle Mountain II	Dance Gavin Dance
8	Dreaming in Black and White	TRUSTcompany
8	Lasers	Lupe Fiasco
8	My Devil In Your Eyes	The Color Morale
8	Pedals	Rival Schools
8	Skins	Buffalo Tom
8	Stronger	Sara Evans
15	Dancing Backward in High Heels	New York Dolls
15	Endgame	Rise Against
15	First World Manifesto	Screeching Weasel
15	Give the Drummer Some	Travis Barker
15	Megalithic Symphony	Awolnation
15	Oh Land	Oh Land
22	Angles	The Strokes
22	Awesome as Fuck (live)	Green Day
22	F.A.M.E.	Chris Brown
22	I Remember Me	Jennifer Hudson
22	Live on I-5 (live)	Soundgarden
22	My Life, My Way	Agnostic Front
22	Vices & Virtues	Panic! at the Disco
22	Under Your Skin	Saliva
22	When You're Through Thinking, Say Yes	Yellowcard
29	All Eternals Deck	The Mountain Goats
29	Disguises	Aiden
29	Doggumentary	Snoop Dogg
29	Femme Fatale	Britney Spears
29	Rolling Papers	Wiz Khalifa
29	Swan	Unwritten Law

=== April ===
Date	Album	Artist
5	American Tragedy	Hollywood Undead
5	Apocalypse	Bill Callahan
5	Blood Pressures	The Kills
5	Cocoon	Meg & Dia
5	Razorback Killers	Vicious Rumors
5	What if We Were Real	Mandisa
11	Nine Types of Light	TV on the Radio
12	C'mon	Low
12	The Family Sign	Atmosphere
12	Lollipop	Meat Puppets
12	Murder the Mountains	Red Fang
12	No Devolución	Thursday
12	So Beautiful or So What	Paul Simon
12	Wasting Light	Foo Fighters
19	Whokill	Tune-Yards
26	All at Once	The Airborne Toxic Event
26	Fishing for Woos	Bowling for Soup
26	Speak-Ahh	Eastern Conference Champions
26	Take Care, Take Care, Take Care	Explosions in the Sky
26	Atavist	Otep
26	The Hollow	Memphis May Fire

=== May ===
Date	Album	Artist
3	And the Tears Washed Me, Wave After Cowardly Wave	Dreamend
3	Are You Gonna Eat That?	Hail Mary Mallon
3	Chuckles & Mr. Squeezy	Dredg
3	Helplessness Blues	Fleet Foxes
3	Hot Sauce Committee, Pt. 2	Beastie Boys
3	In Your Dreams	Stevie Nicks
3	Love?	Jennifer Lopez
3	Move Like This	The Cars
3	Musiqinthemagiq	Musiq Soulchild
3	This Is Gonna Hurt	Sixx:A.M.
10	Goblin	Tyler the Creator
10	I Am Very Far	Okkervil River
10	Let's Cheers to This	Sleeping With Sirens
10	Life Fantastic	Man Man
10	Separation	Balance and Composure
10	Simple Math	Manchester Orchestra
10	Worst Thing I've Been Cursed With	Sparks the Rescue
10	Rock & Roll Submarine	Urge Overkill
10	Volcanic Sunlight	Saul Williams
17	Destroyed	Moby
17	Laugh Now, Laugh Later	Face to Face
17	Mona	Mona
17	Rome	Danger Mouse
17	Running from a Gamble	Company of Thieves
17	Too Cool to Care	New Boyz
23	Born This Way	Lady Gaga
23	Torches	Foster the People
24	Back Burner	For the Fallen Dreams
24	D	White Denim
24	Eclipse	Journey
24	Valleyheart	She Wants Revenge
31	Circuital	My Morning Jacket
31	Codes and Keys	Death Cab for Cutie
31	Macabre Eternal	Autopsy
31	Panic of Girls	Blondie
31	Speed of Darkness	Flogging Molly
31	Ukulele Songs	Eddie Vedder

=== June ===
Date	Album	Artist
7	All 6's and 7's	Tech N9ne
7	The Color Spectrum	The Dear Hunter
7	Cults	Cults
7	Dirty Work	All Time Low
7	Gloss Drop	Battles
7	Illud Divinum Insanus	Morbid Angel
14	All Things Bright and Beautiful	Owl City
14	Find Me	Christina Grimmie
14	Hell: The Sequel	Bad Meets Evil
14	Set The World on Fire	Black Veil Brides
14	Time Together	Michael Franks
21	Alpocalypse	"Weird Al" Yankovic
21	Bon Iver, Bon Iver	Bon Iver
21	The Light of the Sun	Jill Scott
21	Good & Evil	Tally Hall
21	Planet Pit	Pitbull
21	We All Bleed	Crossfade
28	4	Beyoncé
28	Finally Famous	Big Sean
28	Gold Cobra	Limp Bizkit
28	I'm American	Billy Ray Cyrus
28	Taking Back Sunday	Taking Back Sunday
28	This Loud Morning	David Cook
28	The Verge	There for Tomorrow
28	When the Sun Goes Down	Selena Gomez & the Scene

=== July ===
Date	Album	Artist
5	King of Hearts	Lloyd
8	Regional At Best	Twenty One Pilots
12	Best Kind of Mess	Get Scared
12	If Not Now, When?	Incubus
12	Second Family	Patent Pending
12	Sunshine State of Mind	We the Kings
12	Within and Without	Washed Out
12	Yours Truly	Sublime with Rome
13	13 Chambers	Wugazi
19	Everything's Fine	The Summer Set
19	In the Mountain in the Cloud	Portugal. The Man
19	Join Us	They Might Be Giants
19	Sunrise Sessions	Kottonmouth Kings
19	Superfiction	Cold
19	Time of My Life	3 Doors Down
19	Universal Pulse	311
19	War Paint	The Dangerous Summer
26	Follow Me Home	Jay Rock
26	Here I Am	Kelly Rowland
26	Rabbits on the Run	Vanessa Carlton
26	Wilderness	The Features

=== August ===
Date	Album	Artist
2	Bad Habits	Every Avenue
2	Hold On 'til the Night	Greyson Chance
2	King	O.A.R.
2	Sky Full of Holes	Fountains of Wayne
2	Tripper	Fruit Bats
2	Last Words: The Final Recordings	Screaming Trees
2	Victorious soundtrack	Victorious Cast
2	Wicked Will	The Ettes
8	Watch the Throne	Jay-Z and Kanye West
9	In Waves	Trivium
9	Success Is Certain	Royce da 5'9"
9	White Lotus	Eyes Set to Kill
16	Any Man in America	Blue October
16	Deus Ex Machina	Greek Fire
16	Out of Love	Mister Heavenly
16	Shallow Bay: The Best of Breaking Benjamin	Breaking Benjamin
23	The R.E.D. Album	Game
23	Symphony Soldier	The Cab
29	I'm with You	Red Hot Chili Peppers
30	Am I the Enemy	The Red Jumpsuit Apparatus
30	Black and White America	Lenny Kravitz
30	Tha Carter IV	Lil Wayne
30	Re:(disc)overed	Puddle of Mudd
30	WTF	Vanilla Ice
30	Yes and Also Yes	Mike Doughty

=== September ===
Date	Album	Artist
6	Daydreams	Ballyhoo!
6	Trips	Samiam
13	Daybreak	Saves the Day
13	Dead Throne	The Devil Wears Prada
13	A Dramatic Turn of Events	Dream Theater
13	Green Naugahyde	Primus
13	Own the Night	Lady Antebellum
13	s/he	s/he
13	Staind	Staind
13	Strange Mercy	St. Vincent
13	Welcome 2 My Nightmare	Alice Cooper
13	Worship Music	Anthrax
20	Major/Minor	Thrice
20	Night of Hunters	Tori Amos
20	Pearl Jam Twenty	Pearl Jam
20	The Reckoning	Needtobreathe
20	Sweeter	Gavin DeGraw
20	Time Travel	Never Shout Never
20	Unbroken	Demi Lovato
27	Cole World: The Sideline Story	J. Cole
27	Future History	Jason Derülo
27	Music Is Better Than Words	Seth MacFarlane
27	Neighborhoods	Blink-182
27	Unto the Locust	Machine Head
27	Vice Verses	Switchfoot
27	The Whole Love	Wilco
27	Wild Blessed Freedom	Carolina Liar
27	The Year of Hibernation	Youth Lagoon
29	NSFW	Ninja Sex Party

=== October ===
Date	Album	Artist
4	Awakening	Blessthefall
4	Best Intentions	We Are The In Crowd
4	Clear as Day	Scotty McCreery
4	Christmas in Diverse City	tobyMac
4	Mayday Parade	Mayday Parade
4	Odd Soul	Mutemath
4	People and Things	Jack's Mannequin
4	Pighammer	Wayne Static
4	Radiosurgery	New Found Glory
11	American Capitalist	Five Finger Death Punch
11	B in the Mix: The Remixes Vol. 2	Britney Spears
11	Eleven	Martina McBride
11	Evanescence	Evanescence
11	Fastlife	Joe Jonas
11	Third Power	DJ Drama
11	Wildflower	Lauren Alaina
18	The Great Escape Artist	Jane's Addiction
18	Penguin Prison	Penguin Prison
18	Soul Punk	Patrick Stump
24	KABOOM!	I Fight Dragons
24	Stronger	Kelly Clarkson
25	Clancy's Tavern	Toby Keith
25	Violence Begets Violence	Jedi Mind Tricks

=== November ===
Date	Album	Artist
1	Ambition	Wale
1	Four the Record	Miranda Lambert
1	Lulu	Lou Reed and Metallica
1	Open Invitation	Tyrese
1	Smile	The Beach Boys
1	Thirteen	Megadeth
8	Blue Slide Park	Mac Miller
8	Fear of God II: Let Us Pray	Pusha T
8	The Lost Children	Disturbed
8	Love: Part Two	Angels & Airwaves
8	Welcome to Strangeland	Tech N9ne Collabos
15	Camp	Childish Gambino
15	Love After War	Robin Thicke
15	The Papercut Chronicles II	Gym Class Heroes
21	Elevate	Big Time Rush
22	Break the Spell	Daughtry
22	The Day After Tomorrow	Maino
22	My Life II... The Journey Continues (Act 1)	Mary J. Blige
22	Speak Now World Tour – Live	Taylor Swift
29	Whatever	Hot Chelle Rae

=== December ===
Date	Album	Artist
2	Pioneer	The Maine
6	El Camino	The Black Keys
6	Hats Off to the Bull	Chevelle
6	The Magic of Youth	The Mighty Mighty Bosstones
6	The Path of Totality	KoЯn
6	Red	Dia Frampton
6	Revolver	T-Pain
6	Underrated	Bow Wow
6	undun	The Roots
12	Alone III: The Pinkerton Years	Rivers Cuomo
13	Beyond Magnetic	Metallica
13	Rebels	Black Veil Brides
20	The Dreamer, The Believer	Common
20	Thug Motivation 103: Hustlerz Ambition	Young Jeezy

== Top songs on record ==
=== Billboard Hot 100 No. 1 Songs ===
- "Black and Yellow" – Wiz Khalifa (1 week)
- "Born This Way"- Lady Gaga (6 weeks)
- "E.T." – Katy Perry feat. Kanye West (5 weeks)
- "Firework" – Katy Perry (2 weeks in 2010, 2 weeks in 2011)
- "Give Me Everything" – Pitbull feat. Ne-Yo, Afrojack, and Nayer (1 week)
- "Grenade" – Bruno Mars (4 weeks)
- "Hold It Against Me" – Britney Spears (1 week)
- "Last Friday Night (T.G.I.F.)" – Katy Perry (2 weeks)
- "Moves Like Jagger" – Maroon 5 feat. Christina Aguilera (4 weeks)
- "Party Rock Anthem" – LMFAO feat. Lauren Bennett and GoonRock (6 weeks)
- "Rolling in the Deep" – Adele (7 weeks)
- "S&M" – Rihanna (1 week)
- "Someone Like You" – Adele (5 weeks)
- "We Found Love" – Rihanna feat. Calvin Harris (8 weeks in 2011, 2 weeks in 2012)

=== Billboard Hot 100 Top 20 Hits ===
All songs that reached the Top 20 on the Billboard Hot 100 chart during the year, complete with peak chart placement.

- "5 O'Clock" – T-Pain feat. Wiz Khalifa and Lily Allen (#10)
- "6 Foot 7 Foot" – Lil Wayne feat. Cory Gunz (#9)
- "All of the Lights" – Kanye West feat. Rihanna (#18)
- "Back to December"- Taylor Swift (#18 in 2011, #6 in 2010)
- "Best Thing I Never Had" – Beyoncé (#16)
- "Black and Yellow" – Wiz Khalifa (#1)
- "Blow" – Ke$ha (#7)
- "Born This Way" – Lady Gaga (#1)
- "Bottoms Up" – Trey Songz feat. Nicki Minaj (#8 in 2011, #6 in 2010)
- "Cheers (Drink to That)" – Rihanna (#7)
- "Coming Home" – Diddy-Dirty Money feat. Skylar Grey (#11)
- "Dance (A$$)" – Big Sean feat. Nicki Minaj (#12)
- "Dirt Road Anthem" – Jason Aldean (#7)
- "Dirty Dancer"- Enrique Iglesias and Usher feat. Lil Wayne (#18)
- "DJ Got Us Fallin' in Love" – Usher feat. Pitbull (#15 in 2011, #4 in 2010)
- "Don't Wanna Go Home"- Jason Derülo (#14)
- "Down on Me" – Jeremih feat. 50 Cent (#4)
- "Dynamite" – Taio Cruz (#16 in 2011, #2 in 2010)
- "E.T." – Katy Perry feat. Kanye West (#1)
- "Every Teardrop Is a Waterfall" – Coldplay (#14)
- "Firework" – Katy Perry (#1)
- "Fly" – Nicki Minaj feat. Rihanna (#19)
- "Forget You" – Cee Lo Green (#2)
- "Fuckin' Perfect" by Pink (#2)
- "Get It Right" – Glee Cast (#16)
- "Give Me Everything" – Pitbull feat. Ne-Yo, Afrojack, and Nayer (#1)
- "Good Feeling" – Flo Rida (#4)
- "Good Life" – OneRepublic (#8)
- "Grenade" – Bruno Mars (#1)
- "Hair" – Lady Gaga (#12)
- "Headlines" – Drake (#13)
- "Hey Baby (Drop It to the Floor)" – Pitbull feat. T-Pain (#7)
- "Hit the Lights" – Jay Sean feat. Lil Wayne (#18)
- "Hold It Against Me" – Britney Spears (#1)
- "Honey Bee" – Blake Shelton (#13)
- "How to Love" – Lil Wayne (#5)
- "I Love You This Big" – Scotty McCreery (#11)
- "I Need a Doctor" – Dr. Dre feat. Eminem and Skylar Grey (#4)
- "I Wanna Go" – Britney Spears (#7)
- "I'm on One" – DJ Khaled feat. Drake, Rick Ross, and Lil Wayne (#10)
- "If I Die Young" – The Band Perry (#14)
- "If This Was a Movie" – Taylor Swift (#10)
- "In the Dark" – Dev (#11)
- "Inventing Shadows" – Dia Frampton (#20)
- "It Girl" – Jason Derülo (#17)
- "It Will Rain" – Bruno Mars (#3)
- "Jar of Hearts" – Christina Perri (#17)
- "Judas" – Lady Gaga (#10)
- "Just a Dream" – Nelly (#10 in 2011, #3 in 2010)
- "Just a Kiss" – Lady Antebellum (#7)
- "Just Can't Get Enough" – The Black Eyed Peas (#3)
- "Just the Way You Are" – Bruno Mars (#6 in 2011, #1 in 2010)
- "Knee Deep" – Zac Brown Band feat. Jimmy Buffett (#18)
- "Last Friday Night (T.G.I.F.)" – Katy Perry (#1)
- "Lighters" – Bad Meets Evil feat. Bruno Mars (#4)
- "Like a G6" – Far East Movement feat. The Cataracs and Dev (#14 in 2011, #1 in 2010)
- "Like My Mother Does" – Lauren Alaina (#20)
- "Look at Me Now" – Chris Brown feat. Lil Wayne and Busta Rhymes (#6)
- "Loser like Me" – Glee Cast (#6)
- "Love on Top" – Beyoncé (#20)
- "Make Me Proud" – Drake feat. Nicki Minaj (#9)
- "Mirror" – Lil Wayne feat. Bruno Mars (#16)
- "Mistletoe" – Justin Bieber (#11)
- "Moment 4 Life" – Nicki Minaj feat. Drake (#13)
- "More" – Usher (#15)
- "Motivation" – Kelly Rowland feat. Lil Wayne (#17)
- "The Motto" – Drake feat. Lil Wayne (#18)
- "Moves Like Jagger" – Maroon 5 feat. Christina Aguilera (#1)
- "Mr. Know It All" – Kelly Clarkson (#10)
- "Never Say Never" – Justin Bieber feat. Jaden Smith (#8)
- "Niggas in Paris" – Jay-Z and Kanye West (#6)
- "No Hands" – Waka Flocka Flame feat. Roscoe Dash and Wale (#13)
- "No Sleep" – Wiz Khalifa (#6)
- "On the Floor" – Jennifer Lopez feat. Pitbull (#3)
- "Only Girl (In the World)" – Rihanna (#7 in 2011, #1 in 2010)
- "Otis" – Jay-Z and Kanye West feat. Otis Redding (#12)
- "Ours" – Taylor Swift (#13)
- "Paradise" – Coldplay (#15)
- "Party Rock Anthem" – LMFAO feat. Lauren Bennett and GoonRock (#1)
- "Please Don't Go" – Mike Posner (#20 in 2011, #16 in 2010)
- "Princess of China" – Coldplay and Rihanna (#20)
- "Pumped Up Kicks" – Foster the People (#3)
- "Raise Your Glass" – Pink (#4 in 2011, #1 in 2010)
- "Red Solo Cup" – Toby Keith (#17)
- "Remind Me" – Brad Paisley and Carrie Underwood (#17)
- "Rocketeer" – Far East Movement feat. Ryan Tedder (#7)
- "Roll Up" – Wiz Khalifa (#13)
- "Rolling in the Deep" – Adele (#1)
- "Rumour Has It/Someone Like You" – Glee Cast (#11)
- "S&M" – Rihanna (#1)
- "Set Fire to the Rain" – Adele (#13)
- "Sexy and I Know It" – LMFAO (#2)
- "She Will" – Lil Wayne feat. Drake (#3)
- "Skyscraper" – Demi Lovato (#10)
- "Someone Like You" – Adele (#1)
- "Stereo Hearts" – Gym Class Heroes feat. Adam Levine (#4)
- "Stereo Love" – Edward Maya feat. Vika Jigulina (#16)
- "Stitch by Stitch" – Javier Colon (#17)
- "Strange Clouds" – B.o.B feat. Lil Wayne (#7)
- "Super Bass" – Nicki Minaj (#3)
- "Take Care" – Drake feat. Rihanna (#9)
- "The Edge of Glory" – Lady Gaga (#3)
- "The Lazy Song" – Bruno Mars (#4)
- "The One That Got Away" – Katy Perry (#4)
- "The Show Goes On" – Lupe Fiasco (#9)
- "The Time (Dirty Bit)" – The Black Eyed Peas (#8 in 2011, #4 in 2010)
- "Till the World Ends" – Britney Spears (#3)
- "Tonight (I'm Lovin' You)" – Enrique Iglesias feat. Ludacris and DJ Frank E (#4)
- "Tonight Tonight" – Hot Chelle Rae (#7)
- "We Are Young" – Glee Cast (#12)
- "We Found Love" – Rihanna feat. Calvin Harris (#1)
- "We R Who We R" – Ke$ha (#3 in 2011, #1 in 2010)
- "What the Hell" – Avril Lavigne (#11)
- "What's My Name?" – Rihanna feat. Drake (#3 in 2011, #1 in 2010)
- "Where Them Girls At" – David Guetta feat. Flo Rida and Nicki Minaj (#14)
- "Without You" – David Guetta feat. Usher (#4)
- "Work Out" – J. Cole (#14)
- "Written in the Stars" – Tinie Tempah feat. Eric Turner (#12)
- "Yeah 3x" – Chris Brown (#15)
- "Yoü and I" – Lady Gaga (#6)
- "You da One" – Rihanna (#14)
- "You Make Me Feel..." – Cobra Starship feat. Sabi (#7)
- "Young, Wild & Free" – Snoop Dogg and Wiz Khalifa feat. Bruno Mars (#10)

== Deaths ==
- January 1 – Charles Fambrough, 60, jazz bassist, composer and record producer
- January 7 – Bobby Robinson, 93, record producer and songwriter
- January 9 – Debbie Friedman, 59, singer-songwriter
- January 10 – Margaret Whiting, 86, singer
- January 14 – Georgia Carroll, 91, singer, actress and model
- January 17 – Don Kirshner, 76, record producer, music publisher, and songwriter
- January 19 – James O'Gwynn, 82, singer
- January 21 – Tony Geiss, 86, television writer and composer (Sesame Street)
- January 22 – Bobby Poe, 77, singer, songwriter, and record producer
- January 24 – Barrie Lee Hall, Jr., 61, trumpeter and band leader
- January 26
  - Gladys Horton, 65, singer (The Marvelettes)
  - Charlie Louvin, 83, singer-songwriter and guitarist (The Louvin Brothers)
- January 27 – Don Rondo, 81, singer
- January 29
  - Milton Babbitt, 94, composer
  - Emanuel Vardi, 95, violist
- January 31 – Doc Williams, 96, country music performer
- February 8 – Marvin Sease, 64, blues and soul singer-songwriter
- February 10 – Blanche Honegger Moyse, 101, conductor
- February 12 – Betty Garrett, 91, singer and actress
- February 14 – John Strauss, 90, television and film composer
- February 16 – David Shapiro, 58, jazz musician
- February 20 – Eddie Brandt, 90, composer and songwriter
- February 22
  - Beau Dollar (69), soul-R&B singer and drummer
  - Jean Dinning, 86, singer and songwriter (The Dinning Sisters)
- February 24 – Eddie Serrato, 65, drummer (? and the Mysterians)
- February 25 – Rick Coonce, 64, drummer (The Grass Roots)
- February 26 – Mark Tulin, 62, bassist (The Electric Prunes)
- February 27 – Eddie Kirkland, 87, blues musician
- March 8
  - St. Clair Lee, 66, singer (The Hues Corporation)
  - Mike Starr, 44, bassist (Alice in Chains)
- March 10 – Eddie Snyder, 92, songwriter
- March 11 – Hugh Martin, 96, songwriter
- March 15 – Nate Dogg, 41, rapper, singer, and actor
- March 17 – Ferlin Husky, 85, country music singer
- March 21 – Loleatta Holloway, 64, singer
- March 23
  - Ken Arcipowski, 66, singer (Randy & the Rainbows)
  - Henry Jerome, 93, big band leader, trumpeter, arranger, composer
- March 24 – Rozetta Johnson, c. 68, soul and gospel singer
- March 29 – Ray Herr, 63, rock guitarist (The Ides of March)
- March 31 – Mel McDaniel, 68, country music singer-songwriter
- April 9 – Orrin Tucker, 100, bandleader
- April 20 – Gerard Smith, 36, bassist (TV on the Radio)
- April 23
  - Tom King, 68, guitarist and songwriter (The Outsiders)
  - Peter Lieberson, 64, classical composer
- April 26 – Phoebe Snow, 60, singer-songwriter
- May 3 – Odell Brown, 70, jazz organist
- May 13 – Bernard Greenhouse, 95, cellist
- May 27 – Gil Scott-Heron, 62, singer, instrumentalist, poet, and author
- June 2 – Ray Bryant, 79, jazz pianist and composer
- June 3 – Benny Spellman, 79, singer
- June 4 – David "Frankie" Toler, 59, drummer (The Allman Brothers Band)
- June 18 – Clarence Clemons, 69, saxophone player for Bruce Springsteen's E Street Band
- July 11 – Rob Grill, 67, singer-songwriter and bass player (The Grass Roots)
- July 15 – Cornell MacNeil, 88, operatic baritone
- July 24 – Dan Peek, 60, singer-songwriter (America)
- July 29
  - Jack Barlow, 87, country music singer and songwriter
  - Gene McDaniels, 76, singer-songwriter
- August 10 – Billy Grammer, 85, country singer
- August 11 – Jani Lane, 47, glam rock singer (Warrant)
- August 22 – Jerome "Jerry" Leiber, 78, songwriter and record producer
- August 29 – Fred Farran, 74, pop singer (The Arbors)
- September 21 – John Larson, 61, trumpeter (The Ides of March)
- September 27 – Johnny "Country" Mathis, 80, country music singer and songwriter (Jimmy & Johnny)
- October 3 – Kay Armen, 95, singer
- October 8 – Mikey Welsh, 40, bassist (Weezer)
- October 12 – Joel DiGregorio, 67, keyboardist (The Charlie Daniels Band)
- November 7 – Andrea True, 68, porn performer and singer
- November 8
  - Heavy D, 44, rapper, singer, record producer, and actor
  - Jimmy Norman, 74, musician and songwriter
- November 17 – Gary Garcia, 63, musician and songwriter (Buckner & Garcia)
- November 25 – Coco Robicheaux, 64, singer-songwriter and guitarist
- December 3 – Ronald Mosley, 72, singer (Ruby & the Romantics)
- December 6 – Dobie Gray, 71, singer-songwriter
- December 7 – Bob Burnett, 71, folk musician (The Highwaymen)
- December 14 – Billie Jo Spears, 74, country music singer
- December 18 – Ralph MacDonald, 67, percussionist and songwriter
- December 20 – Sean Bonniwell, 71, rock singer, songwriter and guitarist (The Music Machine)

== See also ==
- 2010s in music
- 2011 in American television
- Timeline of musical events
