= Cry Baby Cry =

- Cover of the Northern Songs sheet music

Song by the Beatles

from the album The Beatles
- Released: 22 November 1968
- Recorded: 15, 16, 18 July 1968
- Studio: EMI, London
- Genre: Rock
- Length: 3:03
- Label: Apple
- Songwriter(s): Lennon–McCartney
- Producer(s): George Martin

"Cry Baby Cry" is a song by the English rock band the Beatles from their 1968 double album The Beatles (also known as the "White Album"). It was written by John Lennon and credited to the Lennon–McCartney partnership. The coda of the song is a short segment referred to as "Can You Take Me Back", written by Paul McCartney, which was actually an outtake from the "I Will" session.

== Composition ==
Demos indicate that John Lennon composed the song in late 1967. The original lyrics were "Cry baby cry, make your mother buy." Lennon described to biographer Hunter Davies how he got the words from an advertisement. Some of the lyrics of the song are loosely based on the nursery rhyme "Sing a Song of Sixpence". In a 1980 interview, Lennon denied writing the song, calling it "a piece of rubbish".

== Recording ==
The Beatles' recording engineer Geoff Emerick resigned during the recording of "Cry Baby Cry". His departure was precipitated by Lennon and Paul McCartney's obsessions over the recording of both "Revolution" and "Ob-La-Di, Ob-La-Da", respectively, and the overall tensions of the Beatles sessions. Emerick did not work with the Beatles again until the session for "The Ballad of John and Yoko" nine months later.

After a day-long rehearsal, on 16 July 1968 the basic tracks were laid down for Lennon's guitar part and his vocal on the introduction, McCartney's bass and Ringo Starr's drums, along with Lennon's piano and George Martin's harmonium. All other parts were dubbed in two days later: Lennon's lead vocal, Lennon/McCartney falsetto backing vocals and tambourines, Martin's harmonium introduction, sound effects for tea, and George Harrison's lead guitar – a Gibson Les Paul borrowed from Eric Clapton and soon to be a permanent gift.

== "Can You Take Me Back?" ==
The song is followed on the album by an unrelated and unlisted track, ad libbed and sung by Paul McCartney. Though the song originally had no official name, it popularly became known as "Can You Take Me Back?" after the primary lyric of the song, and has been officially deemed so on the track listing for the 50th anniversary edition of The Beatles, where an unabridged version of the song is referred to as "Can You Take Me Back? (Take 1)" and included among the bonus tracks. The hidden track is an improvised jam recorded by McCartney during a 16 September 1968 session for "I Will".

== Legacy ==
Coinciding with the 50th anniversary of its release, Jacob Stolworthy of The Independent listed "Cry Baby Cry" at number 19 in his ranking of the White Album's 30 tracks. He wrote of the song: "Lennon translated elements of the nursery rhyme 'Sing a Song of Sixpence' for this effort, which comes with an added eerie McCartney segment titled "Can You Take Me Back?" He said that the song is "unremarkable, but remains easy listening". A version of the song was included on the Anthology 3 album in 1996.

== Personnel ==
According to Ian MacDonald:

"Cry Baby Cry"

- John Lennon – lead vocal and harmony vocal, falsetto vocals, acoustic guitar, piano, organ
- Paul McCartney – bass guitar, falsetto vocals
- George Harrison – lead guitar
- Ringo Starr – drums, tambourine
- George Martin – harmonium

"Can You Take Me Back?"

- Paul McCartney – lead vocal, acoustic guitar
- John Lennon – percussion, maracas
- Ringo Starr – bongos

== Cover versions ==
- Ramsey Lewis recorded an instrumental version of this song on his 1968 album Mother Nature's Son.
- Commander Cody and His Lost Planet Airmen covered this song on the 1987 album Flying Dreams.
- The jam band Phish covered this song as part of its near-complete 1994 cover of the White Album released on Live Phish Volume 13, and in 1998 on Hampton Comes Alive. The 1994 version includes "Can You Take Me Back" while the 1998 version does not.
- Samiam recorded a cover of the song, omitting the McCartney coda, for their 1997 album You Are Freaking Me Out.
