= Stumbling Skyward =

EP by Sparks the Rescue
- Released: 2005
- Length: 22:55

Sparks the Rescue chronology
Stumbling Skyward (2005)	Hey, Mr. Allure (2006)

Sparks the Rescue's Stumbling Skyward EP is the band's debut release, and only release without vocalist Alex Roy. Opening track "The Runaway Romance" was re-recorded and re-released for the 2007 EP, The Secrets We Can't Keep.

== Track listing ==
All songs written by Sparks the Rescue.

1. "The Runaway Romance" – 3:28
2. "These Gray Skies" – 3:05
3. "Feet Of Angels" – 3:35
4. "You're Not Alone" – 2:49
5. "Psalm 39" – 3:54
6. "Distance From Regret" – 4:25
7. "Mob Scene" – 2:59
