= Sparks the Rescue (EP) =

EP by Sparks the Rescue
- Released: August 28, 2012
- Recorded: April, 2012 in Westbrook, Maine (Halo)
- Length: 21:47
- Producer: Jonathan Wyman

Sparks the Rescue chronology
Worst Thing I've Been Cursed With (2011)	Sparks the Rescue (2012)	Truth Inside the Fiction (2013)

Sparks the Rescue's Sparks the Rescue EP is the first EP release from the band since 2007's The Secrets We Can't Keep, and the first release featuring David Pait and Dylan Taylor. After being dropped from Fearless Records, the band funded the EP through Kickstarter, generating more than double their $6000 goal. On August 13, the band released a music video for the song "Disaster," which features former member Marty McMorrow.

Professional ratings
Review scores
Source	Rating
AbsolutePunk	(7.5/10) link
The Phoenix (newspaper)	(positive) link

== Track listing ==
All songs written by Sparks the Rescue.

1. "Intro" – :29
2. "Disaster" – 3:11
3. "Water Your Heart (Safe, Sound, and Buried)" – 3:35
4. "Last Chance for Romance" – 3:32
5. "Burn All of My Clothes" – 3:19
6. "Dream. Catch. Her." – 3:39
7. "Phoenix" – 4:02
