= Reach for the Sun =

Studio album by The Dangerous Summer
- Released: May 5, 2009
- Genre: Alternative rock, pop punk
- Length: 41:03
- Label: Hopeless
- Producer: Paul Leavitt

The Dangerous Summer chronology
If You Could Only Keep Me Alive EP (2007)	Reach for the Sun (2009)	War Paint (2011)

Singles from Reach for the Sun
- 1. "Where I Want to Be" Released: April 14, 2009

Professional ratings
Review scores
Source	Rating
AbsolutePunk.net	95%
Kerrang!	3/5 stars
Lost In The Sound	92%
Melodic	3.5/5 stars
Rock on Request	favorable
The Tune	A−

Reach for the Sun is the debut studio album by American alternative rock band The Dangerous Summer.

== Background ==
On November 19, 2008, it was mentioned that the band had started recording their debut album at Valencia Studios with producer Paul Leavitt.

== Release ==
In January 2009, the band went on tour with School Boy Humor and Select Start. On February 6, Reach for the Sun was announced for release in May, and its track listing was revealed. On March 4, "Surfaced" was made available for streaming through the band's Myspace profile. On March 27, it was revealed that the album would be titled Reach for the Sun. In March and April, the band went on tour with Racing Kites, Sparks the Rescue and This Time Next Year. The first single from the album was "Where I Want to Be", which was released to iTunes on April 14, 2009. The album was released on May 5 through Hopeless Records. In June and July 2009, the band went on a US tour with Ace Enders and Person L. In October and November, the group went on a US tour alongside Straylight Run, Brian Bonz and Dave Melillo.

== Track listing ==
1. "Where I Want to Be" – 3:39
2. "Settle Down" – 3:41
3. "Weathered" – 3:54
4. "Symmetry" – 3:00
5. "Surfaced" – 4:05
6. "A Space to Grow" – 4:03
7. "Reach for the Sun" – 3:27
8. "The Permanent Rain" – 3:24
9. "Northern Lights" – 4:31
10. "This Is War" – 4:03
11. "Never Feel Alone" – 3:23

Bonus tracks

1. "Where I Want to Be (Acoustic Version)" – 3:44 (iTunes bonus track)
2. "Good Things" (Vinyl Bonus Track)

== Chart performance ==
Chart (2009)	Peak position
US Billboard Top Heatseekers	42
