= Whatever's Got You Down =

Studio album by Samiam
- Released: September 26, 2006
- Recorded: May & June 2006
- Genre: Punk rock
- Length: 42:36
- Label: Hopeless Records / Burning Heart Records / No Idea Records (remix)
- Producer: Chris Moore

Samiam chronology
Astray (2000)	Whatever's Got You Down (2006)	Trips (2011)

Professional ratings
Review scores
Source	Rating
AllMusic	3.5/5 stars
Alternative Press	4/5 stars
Punknews.org	3.5/5 stars

Whatever's Got You Down is the seventh album from the American band Samiam. It was released on September 26, 2006 on Hopeless Records and Burning Heart Records. It was the band's first album after a six-year hiatus. The re-mix was re-released on November 19, 2013.

== Track listing ==
No.	Title	Writer(s)	Length
1.	"When We're Together"	Beebout, Kennerly	3:14
2.	"Take Care"	Beebout, Loobkoff	3:11
3.	"Get It Right"	Beebout, Loobkoff	3:47
4.	"Do You Want to Be Loved"	Beebout, Loobkoff	3:18
5.	"Storm Clouds"	Beebout, Loobkoff	3:37
6.	"Anything"	Beebout, Kennerly	3:26
7.	"Come Home"	Beebout, Loobkoff	3:25
8.	"Are You Alright"	Beebout, Kennerly	2:37
9.	"Lullaby"	Beebout, Kennerly	4:26
10.	"Believer"	Beebout, Kennerly	2:45
11.	"Holiday Parade"	Beebout, Loobkoff	4:05
12.	"Bide My Time"	Beebout, Loobkoff	3:37
13.	"Bonus track 1" (untitled hidden track)		0:59

== Personnel ==
- Sean Kennerly - guitar
- Jeremy Bergo - bass
- Johnny Cruz - drums
- Jason Beebout - vocals
- Sergie Loobkoff - guitar
