= Billy (Samiam album) =

Studio album by Samiam
- Released: 1992
- Genre: Skate punk
- Length: 49:13
- Label: New Red Archives
- Producer: Armand John Petri, Samiam

Samiam chronology
Soar (1991)	Billy (1992)	Clumsy (1994)

Professional ratings
Review scores
Source	Rating
AllMusic	3/5 stars

Billy is an album from American punk rock band Samiam. It was released in 1992 via New Red Archives.

== Track listing ==
No.	Title	Writer(s)	Length
1.	"Don't Break Me"	Beebout, Loobkoff	5:31
2.	"Well"	Brogan	2:43
3.	"Head Trap"	Beebout, Loobkoff	3:55
4.	"The Pith"	Brohm	2:51
5.	"Go Away"	Brohm	2:14
6.	"Why Where When"	Beebout, Loobkoff	5:16
7.	"Regret"	Beebout, Loobkoff	3:49
8.	"Get Out"	Beebout, Brogan	2:53
9.	"Conditions"	Beebout, Loobkoff	5:07
10.	"Hey Brother"	Beebout, Loobkoff	3:24
11.	"Homeboy"	Beebout, Brogan	2:09
12.	"Ten Feet Tall"	Beebout, Brogan	2:05
13.	"At the Bottom"	Beebout, Loobkoff	7:14

== Personnel ==
- David Ayer – drums
- Jason Beebout – vocals
- James Brogan – guitar
- Martin Brohm – bass
- Sergie Loobkoff – guitar
