= Short Dogs Grow =

American former alternative rock band, active between 1985 and 1990

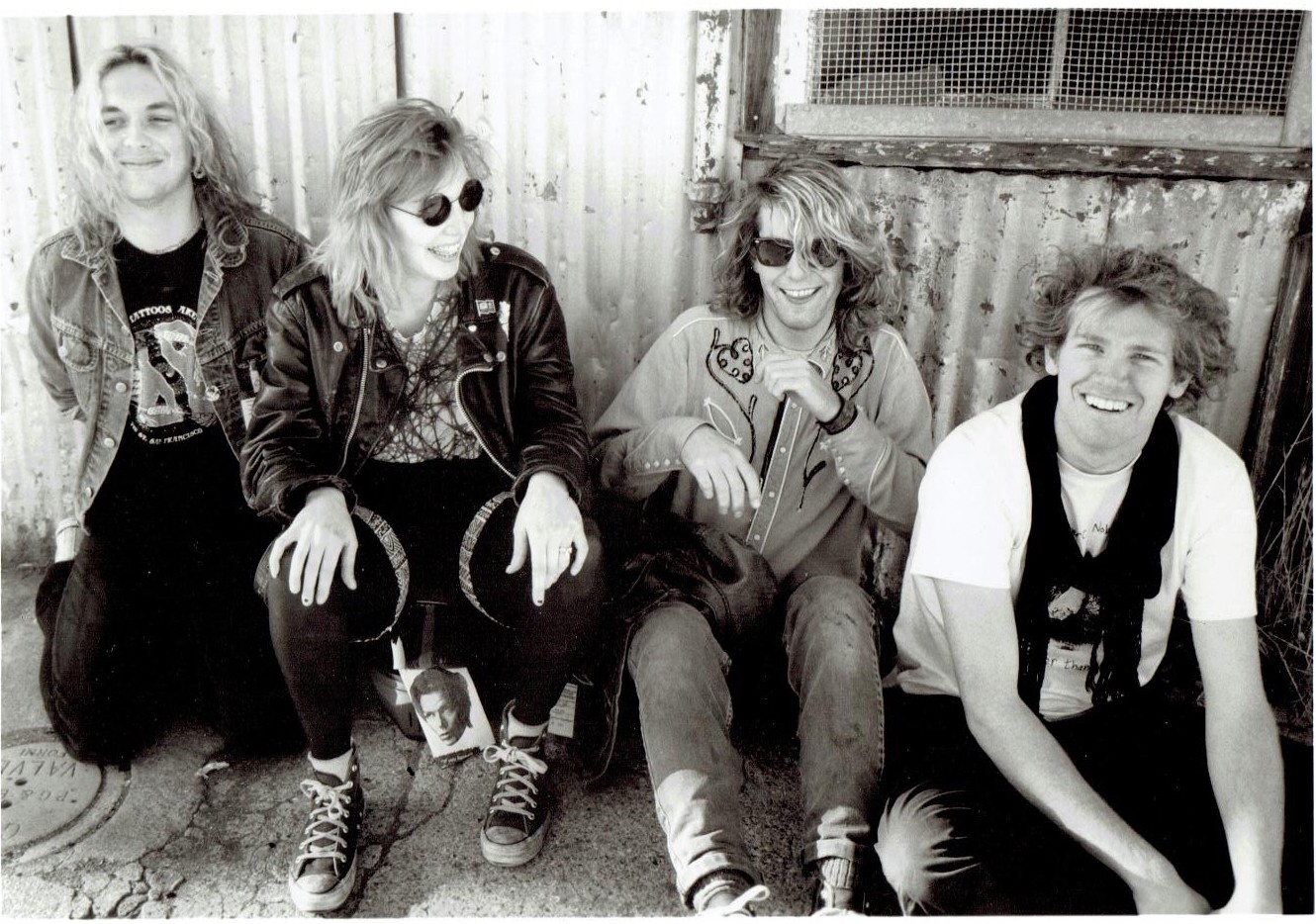
Short Dogs Grow in 1987

Short Dogs Grow was an American alternative rock group, based in San Francisco, that released two albums on Rough Trade Records in 1987 and 1988.

Fellow Bay Area group Samiam counted this band as a major early influence. Samiam guitarist Sergie Loobkoff said, "There was also a local band called Short Dogs Grow that we were really into. They had this great sound that was similar to early Soul Asylum."

Short Dogs Grow included Tom Pitts, who went on to a notable career as a writer, mainly of dark crime fiction.

== Career ==
Tom Pitts and Carmela Thompson formed Short Dogs Grow in 1985. Tom and Carmela were both working for Lightning Messenger service at the time. Carmela was the only female motorcycle messenger in San Francisco. They drew their band's name from the lyrics of the Tom Waits song “On the Nickel” from the 1980 album Heartattack and Vine. The song's title refers to Fifth Street in Los Angeles, long known as a slum, and a "short dog" is a small bottle of cheap wine favored by winos. Pitts and Thompson felt it symbolized the band's philosophy of "not being tied to anything and giving yourself room to grow."

Maximumrocknroll, the San Francisco-based zine of punk subculture run by Tim Yohannan, described Short Dogs Grow in 1987 as "a Bay Area band that tirelessly supports their scene, play great shows and just 'care' in general."

The music of Short Dogs Grow was also likened to Sticky Fingers-era Rolling Stones. Short Dogs Grow was also influenced by the San Pedro band the Minutemen - SDG's demo tape was called Short Songs in a Row. Another writeup noted "power-chord harmonies and bold time changes, reminiscent though not derivative of early Hüsker Dü, with strong, unconventional imagery."

The band called it quits after playing its last show on July 20, 1990. It reunited with all original members for three shows between 2008 and 2012. Tom and Carmela reformed the band in 2024 with drummer, Chewy Marzolo. They released an EP in 2025, titled Quit While You're Young.

== Personnel ==
- Tom Pitts: vocals, guitar (1985–1990, (2024-present)
- Carmela Thompson: bass (1985–1990, (2024-present)
- Greg Kim (a.k.a. Greg Foot): guitar, backing vocals (1986–1990)
- Joe Pethoud: drums (1985–1987)
- George Grunewald (a.k.a. George Fenley): drums (1987–1990)
- Marc Heathfield: vocals (1985–1986)
- Chewy Marzolo: drums, vocals (2024-present)

== Discography ==
- Self-Entitled (1987)
- Matt Dillon (1988)
- Quit While You're Young (2025)
