= Golden Record (album) =

Studio album by The Dangerous Summer
- Released: August 6, 2013
- Label: Hopeless
- Producer: Paul Leavitt

The Dangerous Summer chronology
War Paint (2011)	Golden Record (2013)	The Dangerous Summer (2018)

Singles from Golden Record
- 1. "Catholic Girls" Released: June 4, 2013; 2. "Sins" Released: July 7, 2013

Golden Record is the third studio album by American alternative rock band The Dangerous Summer, scheduled for release on August 6, 2013 through Hopeless Records. The band performed as part of Warped Tour Australia in November and December.

Professional ratings
Review scores
Source	Rating
idobi	4.5/5 stars
Alter the Press	4.5/5 stars
Blare Magazine	6.2/10
Ultimate Guitar	5.7/10

== Track listing ==
No.	Title	Length
1.	"Catholic Girls"	3:43
2.	"Sins"	3:31
3.	"Drowning"	4:12
4.	"Knives"	3:51
5.	"Honesty"	3:45
6.	"We Will Wait in the Fog"	4:17
7.	"Miles Apart"	5:04
8.	"Into the Comfort"	3:18
9.	"I'm So Pathetic"	3:38
10.	"Anchor"	4:15

=== Deluxe version ===
No.	Title	Length
11.	"Sins (Revisited)"	3:54
12.	"Catholic Girls (Revisited)"	3:48
13.	"Miles Apart (Revisited)"	5:28
14.	"Sins (Acoustic Demo Version)"	2:16
