= Astray (album) =

Studio album by Samiam
- Released: August 29, 2000
- Recorded: April & May 2000
- Genre: Hardcore punk
- Length: 44:00
- Label: Hopeless Records / Burning Heart Records
- Producer: Tim O'Heir

Samiam chronology
You Are Freaking Me Out (1997)	Astray (2000)	Whatever's Got You Down (2006)

Professional ratings
Review scores
Source	Rating
AllMusic	3/5 stars
Pitchfork	3.8/10

Astray is an album by the American punk rock band Samiam. It was released in 2000 on Hopeless Records and Burning Heart Records.

== Production ==
The album was produced by Tim O'Heir.

== Critical reception ==
CMJ New Music Monthly wrote that "Samiam makes a smarter, deeper and all the while catchier kind of rawk, filled with dirty guitars and pummeling drums." NME called the album "pop-speckled bittersweet hardcore executed with studied panache."

== Track listing ==
No.	Title	Writer(s)	Length
1.	"Sunshine"	Beebout, Kennerly	3:16
2.	"Wisconsin"	Beebout, Loobkoff	1:51
3.	"Super Brava"	Beebout, Kennerly	3:42
4.	"Mud Hill"	Loobkoff	3:28
5.	"Paraffin"	Beebout, Loobkoff	2:31
6.	"Calloused"	Beebout, Brogan	4:04
7.	"Mexico"	Beebout, Brogan	3:09
8.	"Dull"	Beebout, Loobkoff	4:28
9.	"Curbside"	Beebout, Kennerly	4:43
10.	"Bird Bath"	Beebout, Kennerly	2:36
11.	"How Long"	Kennerly, Loobkoff	3:57
12.	"Why Do We"	Beebout, Loobkoff	6:07

== Personnel ==
- Sean Kennerly - bass
- James Brogan - guitar
- Johnny Cruz - drums
- Jason Beebout - vocals
- Sergie Loobkoff - guitar

== Music video ==
- The music video for "Mud Hill" (Track 4) was shot in the Van Nuys district.
