= Hey, Mr. Allure =

EP by Sparks the Rescue
- Released: April 18, 2006
- Length: 10:30

Sparks the Rescue chronology
Stumbling Skyward (2005)	Hey, Mr. Allure (2006)	The Secrets We Can't Keep (2007)

Sparks the Rescue's Hey, Mr. Allure EP is the band's second release, and first to feature lead vocalist Alex Roy. All three songs were re-released on the 2007 EP, The Secrets We Can't Keep.

== Track listing ==
All songs written by Sparks the Rescue.

1. "Nurse! Nurse! (I'm Losing My Patients)" – 3:41
2. "Saco Boys Have No Class" – 3:48
3. "The Scene: Your Bedroom" – 3:01
