= Truth Inside the Fiction =

EP by Sparks the Rescue
- Released: July 30, 2013
- Length: 26:57

Sparks the Rescue chronology
Sparks the Rescue (EP) (2012)	Truth Inside the Fiction (2013)

Sparks the Rescue's Truth Inside the Fiction EP is the first release featuring Matt Petrin on bass and Nick Bilotta on drums. It is also the first release as a four-piece with Alex Roy sharing guitar duties. The band worked with producer/writer Leland Grant and recorded in Nashville. The band described the release as exploring their "softer side." It is the band's seventh release overall. Upon its release, the EP went to number 51 on the iTunes pop charts.

== Track listing ==
1. "Broken Wings" – 2:55
2. "Suicide King" – 3:12
3. "Coldest Coast" – 3:26
4. "Sunburn" – 3:40
5. "Ceara Belle" – 3:19
6. "Shake Me" – 3:31
7. "Cold Cash Girls" – 3:45
8. "Madison" – 3:09
