= You Are Freaking Me Out =

You are freaking me out

Studio album by Samiam
- Released: 1997
- Recorded: Spring 1996
- Genres: Emo, hardcore punk
- Length: 45:05
- Labels: Ignition Records, Burning Heart Records
- Producer: Steven Haigler

Samiam chronology
Clumsy (1994)	You are freaking me out (1997)	Astray (2000)

Professional ratings
Review scores
Source	Rating
Allmusic	3.5/5 stars
Punknews.org	3/5 stars

You Are Freaking Me Out is the fifth album from the American band Samiam. It was released in 1997 on Burning Heart Records and (the now defunct) Ignition Records.

== Track listing ==
No.	Title	Writer(s)	Length
1.	"Full On"	Beebout, Rubin	3:45
2.	"She Found You"	Beebout, Loobkoff	3:32
3.	"Factory"	Beebout, Loobkoff	3:28
4.	"Ordinary Life"	Beebout, Loobkoff	4:31
5.	"If You Say So"	Beebout, Brogan	4:48
6.	"Good Enough"	Beebout, Loobkoff	3:10
7.	"Mr. Walker"	Beebout, Brogan	3:26
8.	"My Convenience"	Beebout, Brogan	2:58
9.	"Charity"	Beebout, Loobkoff	2:41
10.	"While You Were Waiting"	Beebout, Loobkoff	3:08
11.	"Nothing New"	Beebout, Loobkoff, Rubin	3:34
12.	"Out Of My Mind"	Beebout, Loobkoff	3:07
13.	"Cry Baby Cry" (Beatles cover)	Lennon, McCartney	2:48

== Personnel ==
- Aaron Rubin - bass
- James Brogan - guitar
- Michael Petrak "MP" - drums
- Jason Beebout - vocals
- Sergie Loobkoff - guitar

== Miscellanea ==
- "She Found You" (Track 2) was made twice into a music video, first in the UK and then, secondly in the USA.
- You Are Freaking Me Out was actually completed in 1996 as the follow-up album to Clumsy under contract with Atlantic Records. Nonetheless, Atlantic dropped Samiam from the label and refused to release it. In 1997, Samiam secured the rights to the album and took it to Burning Heart Records for release.
