= Eyes to the Sun =

Studio album by Sparks the Rescue
- Released: October 7, 2008
- Studios: Halo Studios, Westbrook, Maine
- Genres: Alternative rock, pop punk
- Length: 38:07
- Label: Double Blind Music
- Producer: Jonathan Wyman

Sparks the Rescue chronology
The Secrets We Can't Keep (2007)	Eyes to the Sun (2008)	Worst Thing I've Been Cursed With (2011)

Re-release cover
- Cover of the Fearless Records re-release.

Professional ratings
Review scores
Source	Rating
AbsolutePunk	86%

Eyes to the Sun is the first studio album by alternative rock band Sparks the Rescue. It was originally released on October 7, 2008 under the Double Blind Music record label. The album was re-released by Fearless Records on May 5, 2009, and featured new songs, a different track listing, and had all previous tracks remixed and remastered.

== Track listing ==
1. "My Heart Radio" – 2:32
2. "I Swear That She's the One" – 3:29
3. "Autumn" – 3:26
4. "Shipwreck" – 3:16
5. "Hello Mexico" – 3:56
6. "Skeleton" – 3:33
7. "The Gravity" – 3:45
8. "Chemistry Set" – 3:14
9. "Saco Boys Have No Class" – 3:27
10. "We May Be Cruel" – 3:32
11. "Pangaea" – 3:57

== Re-release ==
On May 5, 2009, Fearless Records re-released Eyes to the Sun, featuring new songs and a different track listing and album cover. The previous tracks were remixed and remastered. The digital release features four bonus tracks and a download of the music video for "Autumn".

=== Track listing ===
1. "My Heart Radio" – 2:34
2. "Pine Tree State" – 3:30
3. "Autumn" – 3:26
4. "Hello Mexico" – 3:53
5. "Skeleton" – 3:30
6. "We Love Like Vampires" – 2:56
7. "Shipwreck" – 3:14
8. "I Swear That She's the One" – 3:27
9. "American Blues" – 2:45
10. "The Gravity" – 3:44
11. "Chemistry Set" – 3:13
12. "Saco Boys Have No Class" – 3:27

=== iTunes bonus tracks ===
13. "We May Be Cruel" – 3:32
14. "Pangaea" – 3:57
15. "Autumn" (Acoustic) – 3:17
16. "Hello Mexico" (Alternate version) – 3:54

== Personnel ==
- Alex Roy – lead vocals, keyboards, guitar
- Patrick O'Connell – guitar, backing vocals
- Toby McAllister – guitar, backing vocals
- Ben Briggs – bass
- Nate Spencer – drums
