= Clumsy (Samiam album) =

Studio album by Samiam
- Released: August 23, 1994
- Genre: Hardcore punk; melodic hardcore; punk rock
- Length: 43:26
- Label: Atlantic
- Producer: Lou Giordano

Samiam chronology
Billy (1992)	Clumsy (1994)	You Are Freaking Me Out (1997)

Clumsy is an album by the American band Samiam, released in 1994 on Atlantic Records. The band had been the subject of a bidding war, following the early 1994 success of Green Day; it was Samiam's first album for a major label.

Clumsy's first single was "Capsized". The band promoted the album by opening for Bad Religion on the Stranger Than Fiction tour. Clumsy sold around 13,000 copies in its first six months of release.

== Production ==
The album was produced by Lou Giordano.

== Critical reception ==
Professional ratings
Review scores
Source	Rating
AllMusic	4/5 stars
Robert Christgau	(dud)
MusicHound Rock: The Essential Album Guide	3/5 stars

The Washington Post thought that "if not bursting with originality, such tunes as 'As We're Told' and 'Bad Day' are nonetheless appealingly energetic and melodic." The Philadelphia Inquirer determined that "Samiam favors a thick power-chord attack that supports lithe, wrenching and surprisingly melancholy vocals... The result is music that wallops and cries at the same time."

The Gazette concluded: "No problems here with their Westerberg Jr. angst nor their rock ambitions, but if '94 is the year punk 'broke,' '95 is the year it will be broken." The Press-Enterprise stated that Clumsy "flows between hard-core punk and hippie grunge with lyrics telling of childhood pain and misery." The Albuquerque Tribune referred to the album as melodic hardcore, filled with "underlined aggression, bottled like a clinched-fisted rage."

AllMusic wrote that, "'As We're Told' and 'Bad Day' swell with monstrous punk hooks; meanwhile, two slower numbers, 'Tag Along' and 'Cradle' are, respectively, dreamy and angry enough while still retaining can't-miss melodicism."

== Track listing ==
No.	Title	Writer(s)	Length
1.	"As We're Told"	Beebout, Brogan	3:24
2.	"Capsized"	Beebout, Loobkoff	4:12
3.	"Stepson"	Beebout, Loobkoff	4:16
4.	"Bad Day"	Beebout, Loobkoff	4:01
5.	"Tag Along"	Beebout, Brogan, Rubin	4:17
6.	"Routine"	Beebout, Brogan	2:41
7.	"Simca"	Beebout, Brogan	3:01
8.	"No Size That Small"	Beebout, Loobkoff	3:30
9.	"She's a Part of Me"	Beebout, Loobkoff	3:31
10.	"Cradle"	Beebout, Brogan	4:27
11.	"Time by the Dime"	Beebout, Loobkoff	6:02
Total length:			43:26

== Personnel ==
- Jason Beebout – vocals
- James Brogan – guitar
- Victor Indrizzo – drums
- Sergie Loobkoff – guitar
- Aaron Rubin – bass
