= House (album) =

Studio album by Young Buffalo
- Released: March 3, 2015
- Genre: Indie rock
- Length: 40:25
- Label: Votiv
- Producer: Dave Schiffman

House is an album by Young Buffalo. It was released by Votiv on March 3, 2015. The album was supported by three singles. The video for their first single "Sykia" was released on August 7, 2014. The video for their second single "No Idea" was released on March 4, 2015. The video for their third single "My Place" was released on April 10, 2015.

== Track listing ==
All songs written by Jim Barrett, Ben Yarbrough, and Will Eubanks.

No.	Title	Length
1.	"Man In Your Dreams"	3:49
2.	"No Idea"	3:58
3.	"Guilt"	3:26
4.	"Cliff Diver"	3:34
5.	"My Place"	3:43
6.	"Sykia"	3:42
7.	"Black Eye"	3:17
8.	"Summertime Blondes"	3:50
9.	"Pill"	3:47
10.	"Old Soul"	3:32
11.	"Beat Back"	3:37

== Personnel ==
Young Buffalo

- Jim Barrett – guitars, lead vocals
- Ben Yarbrough - guitars, lead vocals
- Will Eubanks - keyboards, piano

Studio

- Garrett Ray - percussion

Technical

- Dave Schiffman - Engineer, Mixing, Producer
- Nick Rowe - Editing
- Howie Weinberg - Mastering

Photography

- Natalie Moorer - Cover Photo
