= War Paint (The Dangerous Summer album) =

Studio album by The Dangerous Summer
- Released: July 19, 2011
- Genre: Alternative rock, pop-punk
- Length: 44:12
- Label: Hopeless
- Producer: Paul Leavitt

The Dangerous Summer chronology
Reach for the Sun (2009)	War Paint (2011)	Golden Record (2013)

Professional ratings
Review scores
Source	Rating
AllMusic	3/5 stars
Alternative Press	3.5/5 stars
BLARE Magazine	4.5/5 stars

War Paint is the second studio album by American alternative rock band The Dangerous Summer. The album was released on July 19, 2011 through Hopeless Records.

The album was the band's second full-length release on Hopeless Records. The first single, "War Paint" was released on July 7, 2011, and was accompanied by a montage music video. The songs "Work in Progress" and "No One's Gonna Need You More" would also receive music videos after the release of the album. Along with the standard edition of the album, a digital deluxe edition was released the same day, adding two acoustic versions. The album was met with critical acclaim from fans and critics alike. Heather McDaid of DIY applauded the album for the improvements in comparison to the band's debut album and considered it to be a "far more solid and considered release than their debut".

War Paint debuted on the Billboard 200 at number 149, the band's first appearance on the chart. In October 2012, the band supported Lower Than Atlantis on their headlining UK tour.

== Track listing ==
1. War Paint – 4:11
2. Work in Progress – 4:49
3. No One’s Gonna Need You More – 4:16
4. Good Things – 3:16
5. Siren – 3:59
6. Everyone Left – 4:24
7. Miscommunication – 4:04
8. I Should Leave Right Now – 3:37
9. Parachute – 3:31
10. In My Room – 4:21
11. Waves – 3:44
