= Penguin Prison =

American musician

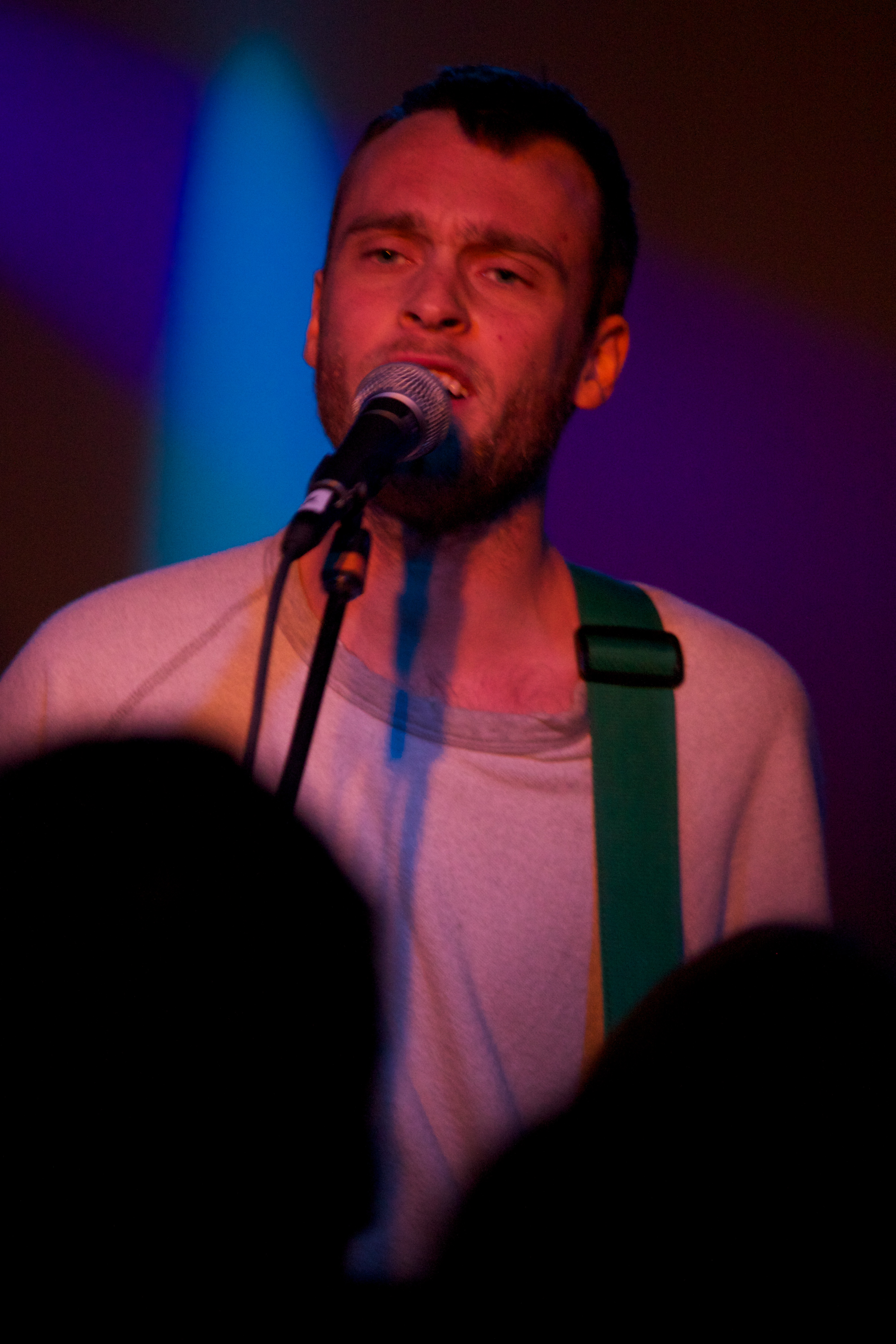
- Penguin Prison in October 2010

Background information
- Origin: New York City, New York, U.S.
- Genres: Synthpop, dance-pop, indietronica, Disco
- Years active: 1999–present
- Label: Downtown
- Members: Chris Glover; Andrew Pertes (on tour); Ben Grubin (on tour); David Gross (on tour)
- Past members: Ernesto Karolys (on tour)
- Website: penguinprison.com

Penguin Prison (born 1983) is an electropop project composed solely of New York City singer, musician, producer and remixer Chris Glover. His stage name comes from a freestyle rap he created with his friend about George W. Bush when they started saying "He's a penguin vision, he went to the penguin prison, and assumed a penguin position". Penguin Prison is known a solo act, but his original songs are often created with the help of other musicians. He has a band for live shows and tours consisting of Andrew Pertes, David Gross, Ben Grubin (of the band Hockey), and formerly Ernesto Karolys.

== Life and career ==
=== Early life ===
Chris Glover was born in 1983 and grew up in New York City's Upper East Side. His early musical influences came mostly from his mother's love of country music. Glover's favorite artists growing up were Johnny Cash, Patsy Cline, and Hank Williams. Glover showed an interest in performing music at an early age when he joined his school's gospel choir at age 10, singing alongside future R&B artist Alicia Keys. When he was 12 years old he was on Star Search. In high school, he performed at CBGB's with his punk band The Museum.

=== 1999-2008: Career beginnings and first album ===
He attended Bard College, where he formed a popular "crazy, fake boy band" called Smartest People At Bard, which he describes as "a cross between Backstreet Boys and Beastie Boys". He was signed to Interscope in 2005 under his birth name in quotes, and recorded an unreleased pop-rap album called Hell Isn't Even That Funny. The album was promoted with the single "Stand On Your Seat" (2005). The album went unreleased because "[The record label] didn't really seem to know what to do with it so I just waited... and then finally said I'm gonna just do something else... and I started doing Penguin Prison shortly after that.".

=== 2009-2014: Penguin Prison ===
As Penguin Prison, he started remixing with the Jamiroquai song "White Knuckle Ride", the Faithless song "Feel Me", the Goldfrapp song "Rocket", and the Marina and the Diamonds song "I Am Not a Robot". These remixes, among others, led into the release of his self titled album Penguin Prison on October 11, 2011 through Downtown Records to positive reviews. After this, he continued remixing songs, and created two songs for the soundtrack of the web series "Dirty Work".

=== 2014-2016: Lost In New York ===
In 2014, Glover collaborated with other artists such as RAC and Viceroy, and made covers of "All Night Long" by Lionel Richie and "Hang On to Your Love" by Sade. On May 5, 2015 he released his sophomore album "Lost In New York".

=== 2017-2024: Turn It Up EP and singles ===
Glover continued making remixes, and released the Turn It Up EP on February 9, 2018. On May 10, 2019, he released "The Heat". On October 9, 2020, he released "Better", a song about the COVID-19 pandemic. Glover stated on his Instagram "This has been a very difficult year for a lot of people - a global pandemic, social injustice, climate change and countless other troubling developments. I wanted to make a song about rising above it all". On February 12, 2021, he released "All Your Love". He explained the meaning of the song on his Instagram, saying "This song is my version of a ballad and a dedication to my wife - an acknowledgement put into record. The past year has brought on a lot of feelings for everyone. For me, a renewed sense of gratitude for the people closest to me." On February 23, 2024, he released a remix of "The Worst" by The Sometimes Island.

=== 2025-Present: Fundamental Feelings ===
In late 2025, Glover announced he has been working on a new album entitled Fundamental Feelings, named after the public access show he had in high school with his friend. He also provided background vocals for the single Undone by Alex Frankel (formerly a member of Holy Ghost!).

== Discography ==
=== With Smartest People at Bard ===
EPs
Title	Details	Track Listing
Welcome To The CD	Release Date: 1999; Label: Self-released; Format: Digital	List: 1. "Uh Oh"; 2. "Dancing And Romancing"; 3. "Don't Fuck With Me Baby"; 4. "Car Crash Girl Die"
...Or Both	Release Date: 2001; Label: Self-released; Format: Digital	List: 1. "Holla At Me Now"; 2. "Playadate"; 3. "____________"; 4. "Baby Cakes"; 5. "This Crazy Game"; 6. "Tao Te Bling"

=== As "Chris Glover" ===
Studio Albums and EPs
Title	Details
Hell Isn't Even That Funny	Release Date: 2005; Label: A&M Records; Formats: CD, Digital
Stand On Your Seat EP	Release Date: March 22, 2005; Label: A&M Records; Formats: CD, Digital download

Singles
Title	Details
Go To Church	Release Date: September 12, 2025; Label: Act Normal Music; Formats: Digital download
You're My Baby (But I Ain't Gonna Burp You)	Release Date: September 26, 2025; Label: Act Normal Music; Formats: Digital download

=== As Penguin Prison ===
Studio Albums
Title	Details
Penguin Prison	Release Date: October 18, 2011; Label: Downtown Records; Formats: CD, Vinyl, Digital download
Lost In New York	Release Date: May 5, 2015; Label: Downtown Records; Formats: Vinyl, Digital download

Extended Plays
Title	Details
Golden Train Remixes	Release Date: November 1, 2010; Label: Stranger Records Ltd.; Formats: CD, Digital download
Multi-Millionaire Remixes	Release Date: June 8, 2011; Label: Stranger Records Ltd.; Formats: CD, Digital download
Fair Warning Remixes	Release Date: August 29, 2011; Label: Stranger Records Ltd.; Formats: CD, Digital download
Don't Fuck With My Money Remixes	Release Date: January 24, 2012; Label: Downtown Records; Formats: Digital download
Calling Out Remixes	Release Date: December 15, 2014; Label: Downtown Records; Formats: Digital download
Turn It Up	Release Date: February 19, 2018; Label: Act Normal Music; Formats: CD, Digital download

Singles
Title	Details
Calling Out	Release Date: October 14, 2014; Label: Downtown Records; Formats: Digital download
Never Gets Old	Release Date: February 10, 2015; Label: Downtown Records; Formats: Digital download
The Heat	Release Date: May 10, 2019; Label: Act Normal Music; Formats: Digital download
Better	Release Date: October 9, 2020; Label: Act Normal Music; Formats: Digital download
All Your Love	Release Date: February 12, 2021; Label: Act Normal Music; Formats: Digital download

Remixes
Title	Year	Artist(s)
I Am Not A Robot	2009	Marina and the Diamonds
Hurtful	2009	Erik Hassle
Rocket	2010	Goldfrapp
Fingers of Steel	2010	Sébastien Tellier
Resurrection	2010	The Temper Trap
Little Secrets	2010	Passion Pit
White Knuckle Ride	2010	Jamiroquai
Get Outta My Way	2010	Kylie Minogue
Zombie	2010	Natalia Kills
Feel Me	2010	Faithless
Settle Down	2010	Kimbra
Remedy	2011	Vinnie Who
Talk Talk Talk	2011	Darren Hayes
Little White Doves	2011	Dirty Vegas
Starry Eyed	2011	Ellie Goulding
True Romance	2011	Golden Silvers
Bang Bang	2011	Mani
It's Time	2012	Imagine Dragons
Paddling Out	2012	Miike Snow
Blue Velvet	2012	Lana Del Rey
She Gets Down On Her Knees	2012	Yoko Ono
Blue Jeans	2012	Lana Del Rey
My Mind	2013	Hockey
Change	2013	Churchill
Too Young	2013	Ghost Beach
Dark Again	2013	Gold Fields
Love Somebody	2013	Maroon 5
Stars	2013	Youngblood Hawke
Weekend	2014	Verite
Blast	2015	Allan Kingdom
Molecules	2015	Atlas Genius
Legs	2015	Chuck Inglish
Love Me Badder	2015	Elliphant
Head Up High	2015	Oh Land
Too Much To Handle	2015	Great Good Fine Ok
Us	2016	Kaskade & CID
Bridges	2016	Broods
I Wish	2016	The Knocks
I Am My Only Love	2016	Baby Raptors
Big Girls Cry	2016	Sia
As Long As I Can See	2017	Broke Royals
Junkie	2017	Freedom Fry
Waiting On The Summer	2017	VHS Collection
Cellophane	2018	Soren Bryce
Electric Touch	2019	A R I Z O N A
Electric	2019	CLARA-NOVA
Stripes + Squares	2019	Julietta
Down Low	2019	Lyrah
So Many Ways	2019	Monogem
Preach	2020	Saint Motel
Together Lonely	2020	Tim Atlas
The World We Were Born Into No Longer Exists	2021	Dotlights
I'm Alright	2021	LEADR
Aslan	2022	Kyle McEvoy & Sunshine Recorder
The Worst	2024	The Sometimes Island
