= Eddie Brandt =

American screenwriter (1920–2011)

Eddie August Brandt (August 5, 1920 – February 20, 2011) was an American composer and songwriter and television writer and animator, but is best remembered for his North Los Angeles store, Eddie Brandt's Saturday Matinee, which rents and sells videos and memorabilia.

== Early life ==
Born in Chicago, the "teenage movie-theater usher" was able to collect film memorabilia. One day, a man bought movie posters from him to decorate his bar, and Brandt realized there was a market for memorabilia.

== Music ==
While serving in the United States Navy during World War II as a "radar specialist" stationed in San Francisco, the self-taught piano player formed a band, Eddie Brandt and the Hollywood Hicks. "He composed music with Spike Jones, Spade Cooley, Eddie Cantor and George Motola in the 1940s, producing hit songs including "Heaven Knows," "None but the Lonely Heart," "There's No Place Like Hawaii," "I'm Drowning My Sorrows," "The Tears in Your Eyes," "High School Romance," "Shortnin' Bread Rock" and "Rock and Roll Wedding."" After the war, he moved to Hollywood. In the early 1950s, he toured with trios and married a member of one of them, singer Ruthie James. James, as Kay Cee Jones, sang the lead vocal on the first recording of Brandt's popular "Shortnin' Bread Rock". The marriage ended in 1956. He was also a bandleader for KLAC-TV Channel 13.

== Television ==
In the 1950s, he wrote for the television shows The Colgate Comedy Hour and The Spike Jones Show, and both wrote for and performed on The Spade Cooley Show. In the 1960s, he worked first as a cartoonist, writer (for a couple of episodes), composer and even voice performer for Bob Clampett on Beany and Cecil. He later became a writer for Hanna-Barbera, where he met his second wife, an animator named Claire. They married in 1968.

== Eddie Brandt's Saturday Matinee ==
In 1967, the couple opened a memorabilia and thrift store in North Hollywood. In the late 1970s, it became the first to rent videos in Los Angeles. As of June 2011, it offered the largest selection of videos in one location in the country: 82,000 videos and 20,000 DVDs, including many that were rare and out of print. There were also about two million photographs and tens of thousands of movie posters. It was considered such a mecca for film buffs that Ben Mankiewicz taped a segment about the store for Turner Classic Movies.

Brandt suffered the first of a series of strokes and had to retire from the store. His wife Claire and their son Donovan now manage the business.

He died at the age of 90 of colon cancer. He was survived by his wife, four daughters and two sons.
