= Mona (band) =

American rock band

MONA
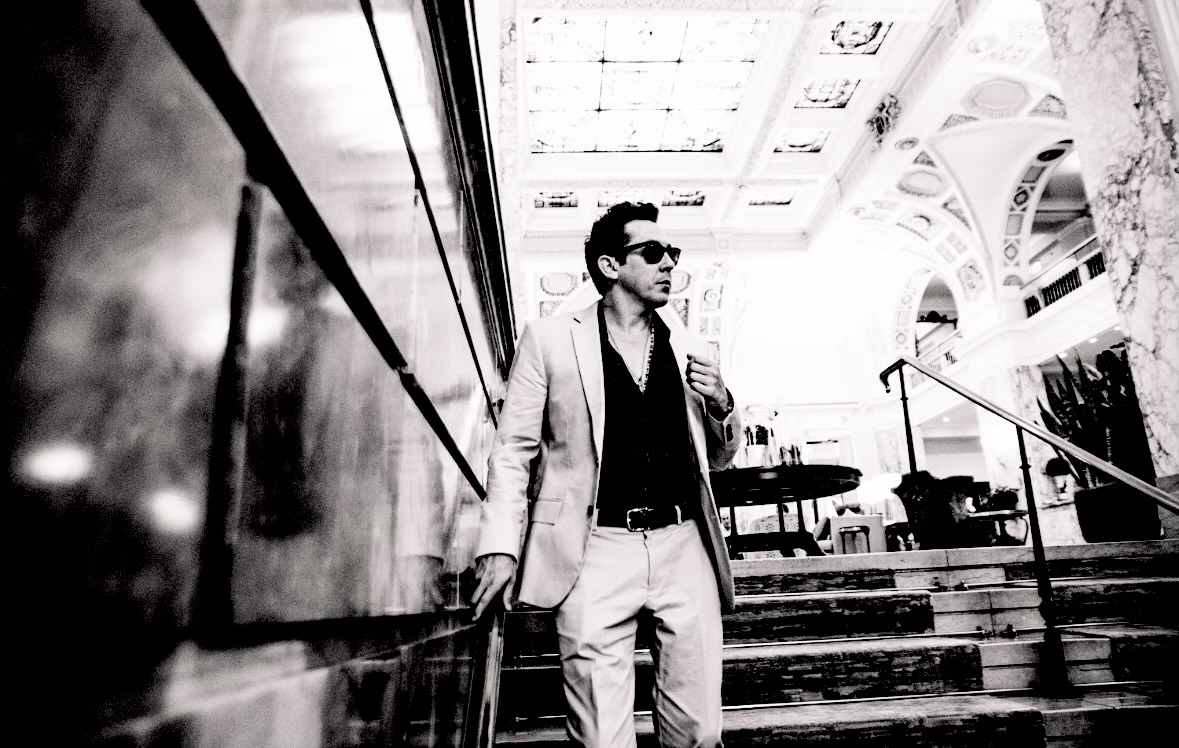
- Nick Brown of MONA in 2023

Background information
- Origin: Dayton, Ohio, (now based in Nashville, Tennessee), United States
- Genres: Alternative rock, indie rock
- Years active: 2004–present
- Members: Nick Brown
- Website: www.monatheband.com

MONA is a project started by Nick Brown. Though there has been a revolving cast of band members, Nick has been the sole driving force behind the band. He began in Dayton, Ohio, though he is now based in Nashville, Tennessee. Brown revealed the band's name refers to his grandmother, Mona Brown.

The band rose to fame appearing as part of the BBC's Sound of 2011 poll; which was revealed on 5 December 2010. The band was also crowned the Brand New for 2011 title at the MTV Awards. Their debut album was released on May 16, 2011 in the UK through ZionnoiZ Recordings/Island Records and was released on February 28, 2012 in the US through ZionnoiZ Recordings/Mercury Records.

== Career ==
=== Nick Brown (2009–2010) ===
In April 2009, Brown was introduced to Saul Galpern, creator of Nude Records by a mutual friend. Soon after their online introduction, Galpern flew to Nashville to meet Nick. Having been very impressed by him, Galpern signed a management contract with the band which led to a record deal with Island Records and Mercury Records in September 2010.

=== MONA (2010–present) ===
On November 20, 2010, the band appeared on the BBC's Later... with Jools Holland, in which they performed the songs "Teenager", "Listen to Your Love" and "Lines In the Sand". On December 6, 2010, it was revealed that Mona had been longlisted on the BBC's Sound of 2011 poll, which predicts artists that will become successful in the year ahead. It was also revealed that month the band had made the longlist of MTV Awards' Brand New for 2011. On February 3, 2011, it was announced Mona had won the title.

The band released their debut single "Listen to Your Love" in the United Kingdom on September 13, 2010 through their own independent record label ZionoiZ Recordings. Second single "Trouble On the Way" was then released through ZionnoiZ Recordings/Island Records on December 13, 2010. Mona released their third single "Teenager" on February 7, 2011. Their fourth and final UK single, "Shooting the Moon", was released on July 31, 2011.

In February 2011 MONA announced the release date of their self-titled debut album which was self-produced by Nick in their basement in Nashville and mixed by producer Rich Costey (Foo Fighters, Muse, Arctic Monkeys).

==== European album release (2011) ====
The official album artwork was released on March 21, 2011.

Mona was released in the United Kingdom on May 16, 2011. They also released the "Listen to Your Love – EP" the same day. Following the album's release the band embarked on a world-spanning tour which saw them play most of the world's largest and most prestigious festivals; including Glastonbury Festival and Reading and Leeds Festival in the UK, Summer Sonic Festival in Japan and Splendour in the Grass in Australia. As well as touring the festival circuit they supported fellow Nashville band Kings of Leon on selected dates of their summer tour, including shows at Slane Concert near Slane, County Meath, Ireland on May 28, 2011 and Hyde Park, London on June 22, 2011.

They also headlined their own tour of the United Kingdom and Europe in the summer and early fall of 2011 culminating in a sold-out show at London's O2 Shepherd's Bush Empire.

==== U.S. album release (2012–present) ====
MONA released their debut album in the United States on February 28, 2012. On that day they made their national television debut on The Tonight Show with Jay Leno performing "Lean Into The Fall", they also appeared on the Conan show on March 2, 2012, playing lead US single "Lean Into The Fall".

=== Torches & Pitchforks (2013) ===
On 12 June 2013 MONA announced that they would release their second album, Torches & Pitchforks, on Mercury Records July 23. The band also announced new tour dates, starting in Columbus, OH on July 7. Their 2013 single Goons (Baby, I Need It All) now serves as the goal song for the Tampa Bay Lightning of the NHL.

=== In the Middle EP (2016) ===
On September 23, 2016, MONA announced that they would release their new EP In the Middle on October 28, on Bright Antenna Records. This will be the first release from the band in 3 years. The band also announced a string of fall tour dates with labelmates The Wombats, followed by a late fall run with July Talk kicking off on Nov 3 2016.

=== Soldier On (2018) ===
MONA's third album Soldier On was released in the summer of 2018. The band toured the U.S. in support of the record, before going to Europe to tour as the opener for Kings of Leon in the winter of 2018–2019. In March 2019 MONA began an extensive 4-month run as the opener on both North American legs of Blue October's King tour.

== Discography ==
=== Studio albums ===
Title	Details	Peak chart positions	
Title	Details	UK	US Heat.
Mona	Released: May 16, 2011; Label: Zion Noiz Recordings/Island Records; Formats: CD, Digital download, Vinyl	39	20
Torches & Pitchforks	Released: July 23, 2013; Label: Mercury Records; Formats: CD, Digital download, Vinyl	—	—
Soldier On	Released: June 22, 2018; Label: Bright Antenna; Formats: CD, Digital download, Vinyl	—	—
Smiley Creatures	Released: January 26, 2024; Label: Zion Noiz Recordings; Formats: CD, Digital download, Vinyl	—	—
Ten Songs From a Memory	Released: June 20, 2025; Label: Zion Noiz Recordings; Formats: CD, Digital download, Vinyl	—	—

=== Singles ===
Year	Single	Album
2010	"Listen To Your Love"	Mona
2010	"Trouble On the Way"	Mona
2011	"Teenager"	Mona
2011	"Listen To Your Love" (reissue)	Mona
2011	"Shooting the Moon"	Mona
2012	"Lean Into the Fall"	Mona
2013	"Goons (Baby I Need It All)"	Torches and Pitchforks
2016	"In the Middle"	In the Middle
2018	"Kiss Like a Woman"	Soldier On
2018	"Not Alone"	Soldier On
2020	"What's Real? (idchyf)"	Non-album single
2023	"All I'm Seeing"	Smiley Creatures
2023	"Nothing is Dead"	Smiley Creatures
2023	"Told Ya"	Smiley Creatures
2023	"Blue Christmas"	Non-album singles
2023	"Sweetheart Like You"	Non-album singles
2023	"Mermaid"	Smiley Creatures
2024	"U Gotta"	Smiley Creatures
2025	"Ain't All Right"	Ten Songs From a Memory
2025	"Oh What a Bother"	Ten Songs From a Memory

=== Music videos ===
2010: "Listen to Your Love" – Mona (Dir. Jordan Noel)

2010: "Trouble On the Way" – Mona (Dir. Jordan Noel)

2010: "Teenager" – Mona

2011: "Listen To Your Love" (reissue) – Mona

2011: "Shooting the Moon" – Mona

2012: "Lean Into the Fall" – Mona (Dir. Jorden Noel)

2012: "Lines in The Sand" – Mona (Dir. Jorden Noel)

2014: "Wasted" – Torches and Pitchforks

2014: "Like You Do" – Torches and Pitchforks

2018: "Kiss Like a Woman" – Soldier On

== Band members ==
Current members

- Nick Brown – lead vocals, guitar, piano (2004–present)

== Awards and nominations ==
Year	Organisation	Nominated work	Award	Result
2010	BBC Sound of 2011	Mona	Sound of 2011	Nominated
2010	MTV Awards	Mona	Brand New for 2011	Won

== See also ==
- The Long Goodbye (Candlebox album)
