= Mona (album) =

Studio album by Mona
- Released: May 13, 2011
- Recorded: Jan–July 2010 in the band's basement, Nashville, Tennessee
- Genre: Alternative rock, indie rock
- Length: 35:20
- Label: Zion Noiz Recordings, Island, Mercury
- Producer: Self-produced

Singles from Mona
- 1. "Listen To Your Love" Released: September 13, 2010; 2. "Trouble On the Way" Released: December 13, 2010; 3. "Teenager" Released: February 7, 2011; 4. "Shooting the Moon" Released: July 31, 2011

Professional ratings
Review scores
Source	Rating
Clash	(7/10)
Daily Dischord	(8/10)
The Music Service	(5/10)
Addict Music	3.5/5 stars

Mona is the debut album by the American alternative rock band Mona. It was released in the United Kingdom and Europe on May 16, 2011 via Zion Noiz Recordings/Island Records and in the United States on February 28, 2012 via Zion Noiz Recordings/Mercury Records.

The album was recorded and produced by the band independently and mixed by producer Rich Costey.

Four singles were released from the album in the UK: "Listen to Your Love", "Trouble On the Way", "Teenager" and "Shooting the Moon". "Teenager" is featured in the soundtracks of the racing video games F1 2011 and Forza Horizon.

Mona was released on CD, digital download and limited edition collector's vinyl which was limited to 500 hand numbered copies.

== Origins ==
Following some turbulent line-up changes, the band's current line up of Nick Brown (vocals/guitar), Vince Gard (drums/percussion), Zach Lindsey (bass/backing vocals) and Jordan Young (guitar/backing vocals) began recording what would become their debut album.

== Recording and production ==
The album was recorded in the band's basement in Nashville, Tennessee. Originally conceived as merely demos (they recorded nearly 100 songs leading up to the selection of the album's track list) each song was recorded live, most in just 2-3 takes. After deciding to release these demos as their debut album, the band added minimal overdubs and gave the tracks to acclaimed producer Rich Costey (Foo Fighters, Muse, Arctic Monkeys) to mix.

== Release and promotion ==
The official album art was released on March 21, 2011.

The album was released in the UK on May 16, 2011. The next day Mona played their biggest show to date at the sold out Electric Ballroom in Camden Town, London, England.

They followed the release with a world win run which saw them play most of the world's largest festivals; including Glastonbury Festival and Reading and Leeds Festival in the UK, Summer Sonic Festival in Japan and Splendour in the Grass in Australia. As well as touring the festival circuit they supported fellow Nashville band Kings of Leon on selected dates of their summer tour, including shows at Slane Concert near Slane, County Meath, Ireland and Hyde Park, London. They also headlined their own tour in the summer and early fall culminating in a sold out show at London's O2 Shepherd's Bush Empire.

== Track listing ==
All music is composed by Nick Brown, Vincent Gard, Zachary Lindsey, Jordan Young.

No.	Title	Length
1.	"Cloak & Dagger"	2:40
2.	"Listen To Your Love"	3:25
3.	"Teenager"	2:55
4.	"Lines In the Sand"	3:23
5.	"Taboo Lights"	2:54
6.	"Lean Into the Fall"	3:10
7.	"Say You Will"	4:11
8.	"Shooting the Moon"	3:26
9.	"Pavement"	3:00
10.	"Trouble On the Way"	2:36
11.	"Alibis" (hidden track not listed on album)	3:38
12.	"All This Time" (bonus track available only with pre ordered copies from HMV stores)	3:15
13.	"The Tally" (track 7 on US release)	2:35
14.	"I Seen" (track 12 on US release)	3:33

== Personnel ==
- Nick Brown – vocals, guitar
- Vincent Gard – drums, percussion
- Zachary Lindsey – bass guitar
- Jordan Young – lead guitar

== Release history ==
Region	Date	Label	Format(s)
United Kingdom	May 16, 2011	Zion Noiz Recordings/Island	CD, digital download
Europe	May 16, 2011	Zion Noiz Recordings/Island	CD, digital download
United States	February 28, 2012	Zion Noiz Recordings/Mercury	CD, digital download
