= Worst Thing I've Been Cursed With =

Studio album by Sparks the Rescue
- Released: May 10, 2011
- Recorded: March 11, 2011
- Studio: Halo Studios, Westbrook, Maine
- Genre: Alternative rock, pop punk
- Length: 41:02
- Label: Fearless
- Producer: Jonathan Wyman

Sparks the Rescue chronology
Eyes to the Sun (2008)	Worst Thing I've Been Cursed With (2011)	Sparks the Rescue (EP) (2012)

Professional ratings
Review scores
Source	Rating
AbsolutePunk	8/10
The Phoenix	(positive)
Lexington Music Press	8.5/10
Mind Equals Blown	6.5/10
The Sound Alarm	7.5/10

Worst Thing I've Been Cursed With is the second studio album and fifth release overall by alternative rock band Sparks the Rescue. The album and track listing were announced by the band on March 11, 2011. The album was released on May 10, 2011. Mike Naran makes his debut on this album following the departure of former rhythm guitarist Patrick O'Connell.

== Release ==
Sparks the Rescue released previews for all their songs shortly after announcing the album. The first song available on iTunes was "She's a Bitch, and I'm a Fool," followed by "The Weirdest Way." The band then announced they would be releasing the eponymous track "Worst Thing I've Been Cursed With." The track was first made available on the iTunes Store in April 2011.

== Track listing ==
1. "Saturday Skin" – 3:30
2. "She's a Bitch, and I'm a Fool" – 2:53
3. "The Weirdest Way" – 3:46
4. "High and Hazy" – 3:05
5. "Worst Thing I've Been Cursed With" – 3:31
6. "Better Side of Me" – 3:17
7. "Postcard of a Tidal Wave" – 3:26
8. "Vanities" – 3:53
9. "Holiday" – 3:40
10. "60 Minutes of Fame" – 3:06
11. "How to Make a Heart Hollow" (Featuring Jessica Leplon of The Morning Of) – 3:50
12. "Thought You Were the One" – 3:30
13. "Better Side of Me (Charlie Sheen Version)" (iTunes bonus track) – 3:19
