= Penguin Prison (album) =

Studio album by Penguin Prison
- Released: 18 October 2011
- Genre: Synthpop, dance-pop, indietronica
- Label: Downtown Records
- Producer: Chris Glover

Penguin Prison chronology
Penguin Prison (2011)	Lost in New York (2015)

Penguin Prison is the debut album by New York dance-pop recording artist Penguin Prison. The album was released on 18 October 2011 by Downtown Records.

== Track listing ==
No.	Title	Length
1.	"Don't Fuck with My Money"	4:12
2.	"A Funny Thing"	4:36
3.	"Golden Train"	5:41
4.	"Multi-Millionaire"	3:24
5.	"Something I'm Not"	4:16
6.	"The Worse It Gets"	3:14
7.	"Fair Warning"	4:28
8.	"Desert Cold"	3:51
9.	"Pinocchio"	5:14
10.	"In the Way"	4:06
11.	"Someone Got Everything"	3:15
12.	"Animal Animal (iTunes Bonus Track)"	4:04

== Critical reception ==
The album was released to generally positive reviews. Tom Hocknell of BBC Music noted that the album is "an entertaining showcase of the New York producer/remixer’s talents" and that the album is "a strong and entertaining calling card, albeit not an album that flows as smoothly as it might, demonstrating Penguin Prison has more to offer than fantastic remixes." Andy Peterson of Contactmusic.com gave the album a generally positive review, stating, "New Yorker Chris Glover is clearly well schooled in the machinations of the pop game" and concludes that "Penguin Prison is flawed that way, but it still has a beautiful body, and it still wants to hold it against you. Let it."
