= Young Buffalo =

American indie rock band

- Origin: Oxford, Mississippi, USA
- Genre: Indie rock
- Years active: 2009–2016
- Label: Votiv
- Members: Jim Barrett; Ben Yarbrough; Will Eubanks; Andrew Guinn; Timothy Burkhead
- Website: Archived website

Young Buffalo was an indie rock band from Oxford, Mississippi.

== History ==
Jim Barrett and Ben Yarbrough started writing music together when they were teenagers.

They continued to play music together, along with other friends throughout high school, and it was during this time that Barrett self recorded an EP in the spring of 2009 for a school project (which he failed) under the name "Young Buffalo" (a nickname he had for Ben in school). The recordings ended up being well received locally, and the duo brought the "Young Buffalo" project to life.

In July 2011, Young Buffalo released the "Young Von Prettylips EP" on Cantora Records, an American label noted for signing the then-unknown psychedelic rock band MGMT for their second EP, Time to Pretend EP. Young Buffalo were listed as "new band of the day" by the UK newspaper The Guardian. Indie Rock Cafe included the "Young Von Prettylips EP" in their six "Best New Releases" of July. They opened for the popular English band Arctic Monkeys several times, including a sold-out show in Austin, TX.

In 2012, Young Buffalo signed with Seattle label Votiv and released their self-titled EP, the "Young Buffalo EP", which has been described as "vintage swagger that contributes to the inherent uniqueness of this Afrobeat-tinged indie rock release." The EP was released on iTunes in August. Young Buffalo toured around the US and the UK, including playing South by Southwest, where NPR featured the "Young Von Prettylips EP" single "Catapilah" in their "The Austin 100" radio mix. In November 2012, Paste Magazine premiered the video for "Upstairs" from the "Young Buffalo EP" and described the song as "a step toward maturity and a more cohesive sound" for the band. AOL music website Spinner posted "Upstairs" as "Video of the Day" in December. Young Buffalo continued to tour across the US in support of their EP release with Admiral Fallow and label mates White Arrows.

In February 2013, the "Young Buffalo EP" was listed as the No. 1 EP in the CMJ Radio 200. The group also stated in an interview in March 2013 that they hoped to release their first album in early 2014.

In 2015, the band released their only album House on Votiv records.

Young Buffalo's last listed tour date was March 3, 2016 at Proud Larry's, Oxford, Mississippi. The band's website expired in January 2016.

== Post Break-Up ==
In 2022, James Barrett founded Good Things Are Happening Fest in Scranton, PA, which he also performs at.

Ben Yarbrough is an Assistant Professor of Practice at Delta State’s Delta Music Institute. After Young Buffalo broke up, Yarborough enrolled in Delta State and earned his BS. He continued to work at the DSU studio while pursuing a master's degree. He taught an adjunct class before becoming a full-time professor in January 2023. He continues to record independently with other artists.

== Members ==
- Jim Barrett - Guitar, Vocals
- Ben Yarbrough - Guitar, Vocals
- Will Eubanks - Keyboards
- Andrew Guinn- Bass
- Timothy Burkhead - Drums, Vocals

== Discography ==
- "Young Von Prettylips" (2011)
- "Young Buffalo" EP (2012)
- House (2015)
