= NSFW (Ninja Sex Party album) =

Studio album by Ninja Sex Party
- Released: September 29, 2011
- Recorded: MetroSonic Recording Studios, Brooklyn, New York
- Genre: Comedy rock; synth-pop
- Length: 33:20
- Label: Self-released
- Producer: Brian Wecht

Ninja Sex Party chronology
NSFW (2011)	Strawberries and Cream (2013)

Singles from NSFW
- 1. "Dinosaur Laser Fight" Released: August 18, 2011

NSFW (Ninja Sex For Women) is the debut studio album by the American musical comedy duo Ninja Sex Party, released on September 29, 2011. It is a collection of all the songs that the duo released as music videos from October 22, 2009 to August 17, 2011, alongside new tracks. The song "Dinosaur Laser Fight" was the only single released from the album, and has a music video partially animated by Arin Hanson, also known as Egoraptor. Every song on the album has a music video except for "Introduction", "Accept My Shaft", and "Outroduction". The album was released on CD in 2015, and charted modestly well in the US.

== Track listing ==
All tracks are written by Dan Avidan and Brian Wecht.

No.	Title	Length
1.	"Introduction"	0:56
2.	"NSP Theme Song" (released February 1, 2012)	2:08
3.	"The Decision" (released December 14, 2009)	1:59
4.	"Dinosaur Laser Fight" (released August 17, 2011)	2:00
5.	"Objects of Desire" (released March 3, 2011)	2:33
6.	"If We Were Gay" (released October 7, 2010)	1:58
7.	"No Reason Boner" (released February 12, 2010)	3:02
8.	"Puppies in Space"	0:26
9.	"Sex Training" (released January 25, 2011)	1:44
10.	"Manticore" (released July 15, 2011)	3:01
11.	"You Can Do Us!" (released May 4, 2011)	2:00
12.	"I Just Want to (Dance)" (released October 22, 2009)	2:25
13.	"Three Minutes of Ecstacy"	3:58
14.	"Accept My Shaft"	4:14
15.	"Outroduction"	0:54
Total length:		33:24

== Personnel ==
- Dan Avidan – vocals
- Brian Wecht – music, production, spoken vocals (tracks 7 and 12)
- Charlie Shaw – drums (track 7)
- Arin Hanson – additional vocals (track 4), animation

== Charts ==
=== Weekly charts ===
Chart (2015)	Peak position
US Billboard 200	55
US Comedy Albums (Billboard)	1
US Independent Albums (Billboard)	5
US Top Album Sales (Billboard)	21

=== Year-end charts ===
Chart (2015)	Position
US Comedy Albums (Billboard)	7
