= Trips (Samiam album) =

Studio album by Samiam
- Released: September 6, 2011
- Recorded: March & April 2011
- Genre: Punk rock
- Length: 42:36
- Label: Hopeless Records
- Producer: Chris Dugan

Samiam chronology
Whatever's Got You Down (2006)	Trips (2011)

Professional ratings
Review scores
Source	Rating
AllMusic	3/5 stars
Ox-Fanzine	4.5/5 stars
Punknews.org	4/5 stars

Trips is an album by the American punk rock band Samiam, released in 2011.

It peaked at No. 42 on Billboard's Heatseekers Albums chart.

== Critical reception ==
Exclaim! wrote that "'80 West' is an upbeat opener, with simple, sweet melodies that remind how well singer Jason Beebout can deliver a hook." Philadelphia Weekly called the album "nearly the equal of [Samiam's] halcyon moment, 1994's Clumsy. The East Bay Express opined that "Beebout still sounds remarkably fresh, and the up-tempo, riff-based tunes have a lot of muscle."

== Track listing ==
No.	Title	Length
1.	"80 West"	1:52
2.	"Clean Up"	2:02
3.	"September"	2:48
4.	"Demon"	2:42
5.	"Crew of One"	2:11
6.	"Dead"	3:16
7.	"How Would You Know"	2:30
8.	"Nightly"	3:07
9.	"Free Time"	2:44
10.	"El Dorado"	5:07
11.	"Magellan"	3:38
12.	"Did You Change"	3:30
13.	"Happy for You"	4:13
