= Sparks the Rescue =

American rock band

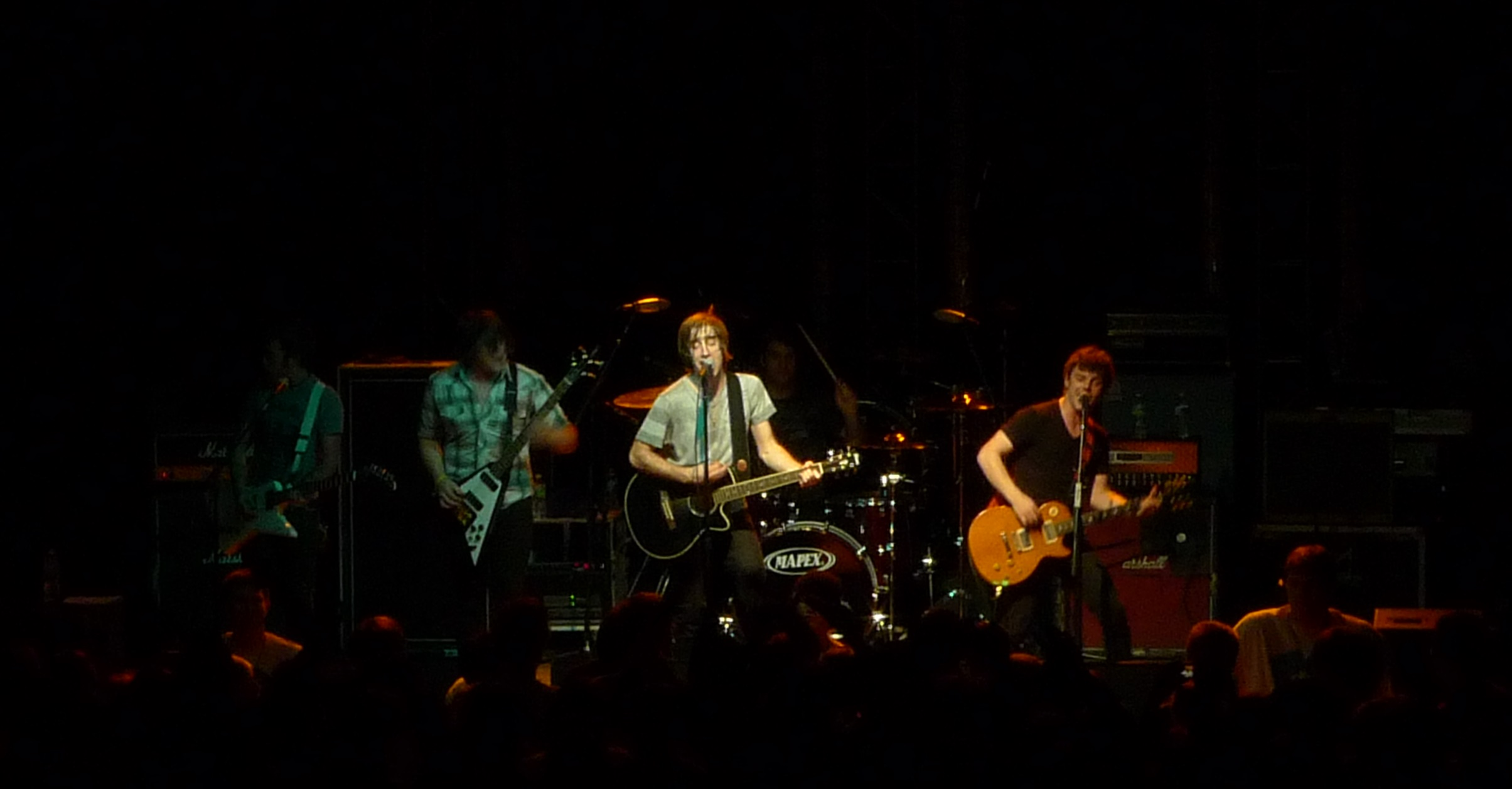
- Sparks the Rescue in 2009

Background information
- Origin: Portland, Maine, U.S.
- Genres: Alternative rock, pop punk, pop rock, post hardcore (early)
- Years active: 1999–present
- Labels: Unsigned Double Blind Music (2005–2007) Fearless Records (2008–2010)
- Members: Alex Roy; Toby McAllister; Nathan Spencer; Marty McMorrow; Patrick O'Connell; Ben Briggs
- Past members: David Pait; Mike Naran; Dylan Taylor; Nick Bilotta; Matt Petrin; Matt Libby

Sparks the Rescue is an American rock band from Maine. They formed when members of three high school bands, Pozer, Short of April, and Two Girls Later, converged. Their debut EP, Stumbling Skyward, was released independently in 2005 with McAllister and O'Connell sharing main vocal duties. The band released the Hey, Mr. Allure EP in 2006, which saw the addition of lead vocalist Alex Roy. On February 6, 2007, Sparks the Rescue released their junior EP, The Secrets We Can't Keep, after signing to Double Blind Music. This release saw the departure of their keyboardist. STR officially released their debut full-length album Eyes to the Sun on May 5, 2009, on Fearless Records (the album was previously released October 7, 2008, on Double Blind Music). The album was produced by Jonathan Wyman of Halo Studios in Westbrook, Maine.

== History ==
=== Formative years (1999–2006) ===
Toby McAllister, Ben Briggs, and Nate Spencer formed the group Pozer in 1999, while still in junior high school. After years of local shows and failed Battle of bands competitions the band decided to add Patrick O'Connell on guitar and vocals and Marty Mcmorrow on synthesizer and vocals. The band changed their name to Sparks the Rescue and started shedding its skate punk aesthetic—gaining popularity and playing shows throughout New England. Alex Roy was added as main vocalist in 2006, and the group heavily toured the East Coast in preparation for and support of their new Hey, Mr. Allure EP.

=== Independent success (2007–2008) ===
The band released the EP The Secrets We Can't Keep in 2007. Following McMorrow's departure as keyboardist, the band released their first full album Eyes to the Sun, on Double Blind Music in 2008. This album got the group signed to Fearless Records, and shows the band's evolution from scream-fueled hardcore music to their current hook-filled pop punk sound.

=== Fearless Records debut (2009) ===
In May 2009 Fearless re-released Eyes To The Sun featuring new songs and a different track listing. Billboard charts for the 5-15-09 issue reported Eyes to the Sun coming in at 3rd in the Top Heatseekers Chart for the Northeast, and tracks from the album received play on MTV's The Hills and The Real World: Cancun. In late 2009, MTV announced Sparks the Rescue as the official winner of the 2009 "I Want My Music On MTV! Competition!", stating that the band will "rub elbows with A-List artists at the 2009 Woodie Awards".

=== Fearless departure, lineup changes, Worst Thing I've Been Cursed With and Sparks the Rescue EP (2010–2012) ===
In 2010 the band toured with bands like The All-American Rejects, Sum 41, Haste the Day, and Attack Attack!. Right before touring with Mayday Parade, Patrick O'Connell decided to part ways with the band. "He just didn't want to be on tour anymore. He was into going home, getting a job and an apartment like a normal person," McAllister said of the split. Soon after O'Connell's departure, the band added guitarist Mike Naran. In March 2011 the band revealed the album art and track listing for their second full-length album Worst Thing I've Been Cursed With, which was released on May 10, 2011, in North America. The band also announced a tour with The Dangerous Summer in support of the new release.

On August 11, 2011, Back Road Eyes Media announced on Tumblr that bassist Ben Briggs had been replaced by David Pait. In December 2011, Fearless Records released Sparks The Rescue from their contractual obligations due to the departure of crucial band members, and the band teamed up with manager Adam Lopez and New Age Media Management. The band started a Kickstarter campaign to fund the recording of their next album, generating more than double their $6000 goal. The band also announced a new EP planned for Summer 2012. Drummer Nathan Spencer left the band on April 12, 2012, and was replaced with Dylan Taylor, leaving only McAllister as the band's original member.

The band's new self-titled EP was released on August 28, 2012, and on August 13, the band released a music video for their new song "Disaster," which featured former member Marty McMorrow doing guest vocals and synthesizers. This led to many fans believing he had rejoined the band; however, in response to YouTube comments on the video, Marty stated that he did not rejoin, and that he was "just helping out some friends."

=== The "new" STR (2013–2020) ===
On December 21, 2012, the band announced on Facebook that Mike Naran, David Pait, and Dylan Taylor's last show would be December 22, 2012, at The Space in Hamden, CT. Roy and McAllister toured acoustically in early 2013 as Sparks the Rescue, and in April 2013 the band released promotion photographs with Mat Petrin (bassist) and Nick Bilotta (drummer), who are also members of Roy's side-project band Holly Heist and original high school band 2 Girls Later. The band began performing with this lineup as a four piece in the Spring of 2013, and released a new EP titled "Truth Inside the Fiction" on July 30, 2013. The EP debuted at #33 on the iTunes Top Pop Albums Chart.

On July 21, 2013, Roy and Bilotta along with a new guitarist, booked a cover show in Portland's historic downtown district at a night club called Oasis.

In the summer of 2013, the band announced the Taking The D-Tour with opening bands Kingsfoil (featuring Frankie Muniz on drums) and Lion In The Mane. The band continued to play cover shows under the STR name with a new line-up including Matt Libby (rhythm guitar/vocals), a member of Bilotta's former project The Derek Wilkinson Band. Bilotta's last shows were in Key West at Sloppy Joe's in September 2014.

== Band members ==
Current members

- Alex Roy - lead vocals (2006–present); keyboards, piano, programming (2008–2020); rhythm guitar (2013-2014)
- Toby McAllister - rhythm guitar (1999–present), backing vocals (2006–present); lead vocals (1999-2006)
- Marty McMorrow - unclean vocals, keyboards, synthesizers, piano, programming (2005-2008, 2020-present, session member 2012)
- Patrick O'Connell - lead guitar (2005-2010, 2020-Present)
- Ben Briggs - bass (1999-2011, 2020-Present)
- Nathan Spencer - drums, percussion (1999-2012, 2014–present)

Former members

- Matt Libby - rhythm guitar (2014–2020)
- Mat Petrin - bass (2013–2020)
- Mike Naran - lead guitar (2010-2012)
- David Pait - bass (2011-2012)
- Dylan Taylor - drums, percussion (2012)
- Nick Bilotta - drums, percussion (2013-2014)

== Discography ==
=== Studio albums ===
- Eyes to the Sun (2008)
- Worst Thing I've Been Cursed With (2011)

=== EPs ===
- Stumbling Skyward (2005)
- Hey, Mr. Allure (2006)
- The Secrets We Can't Keep (2007)
- Sparks the Rescue (EP) (2012)
- Truth Inside the Fiction (2013)
- When It Thunders (EP) (2017)

=== Compilation appearances ===
'Tis the Season to Be Fearless

"Christmas Brings Me Down"

- Punk Goes Pop 3

"Need You Now" (Lady Antebellum cover)

- Punk Goes X

"Mountain Song" (Jane's Addiction cover)

- Take Action! Vol. 10

"Forever in My Songs"
