= Roszetta Johnson =

American singer (1942 - 2011)

Roszetta Johnson (June 11, 1942 – March 24, 2011), later Roszetta Johnson Scovil, was an American soul and gospel singer. She recorded for several labels during and after the 1960s, and was often credited as Rozetta Johnson. Her most successful record was "A Woman's Way", which reached the Billboard Hot 100 in 1970.

== Life and career ==
She was born in Tuscaloosa, Alabama, and grew up singing in her local church choir. She joined a gospel vocal group, the Violet Harmonettes, and after her parents separated moved to Birmingham, and then McIntosh, Alabama. She began singing in the 1960s at the 401 Club in Birmingham. Her first record, "A Woman's Way", was produced by Sam Dees and was recorded in 1970 for the Clin-Tone label in Birmingham. It rose to no. 39 on the Billboard R&B Chart and no. 94 on the pop chart. She toured as part of the Bill Doggett Revue and recorded several further singles for Clin-Tone, including "Who Are You Gonna Love (Your Woman Or Your Wife)", which reached no. 45 on the R&B chart in 1971.

After her brief career as a soul singer ended, she taught at Ramsay High School in Birmingham. She was inducted into the Alabama Jazz Hall of Fame in 1982, and soon afterwards began performing again as a gospel singer, touring in Japan and Europe. She recorded several gospel albums from the 1980s onwards, and in 2007 won the title of best female vocalist in the Birmingham Alabama Music Awards (BAMA).

She died in 2011, after suffering from breast cancer.
