= The Secrets We Can't Keep =

EP by Sparks the Rescue
- Released: February 6, 2007
- Genre: Post-hardcore
- Length: 22:51
- Label: Double Blind Music

Sparks the Rescue chronology
Hey, Mr. Allure (2006)	The Secrets We Can't Keep (2007)	Eyes to the Sun (2008)

Singles from The Secrets We Can't Keep
- 1. "Nurse! Nurse! (I'm Losing My Patients)" Released: January 15, 2007

Professional ratings
Review scores
Source	Rating
AbsolutePunk	(8/10) link
Punknews.org	(1.5/5) link
eMusic	(3.5/5) link

The Secrets We Can't Keep is an EP by American band Sparks the Rescue, released only in digital format on February 6, 2007. It is the band's third release overall, but their first while signed to a record label, having been released by Double Blind Music.

The release, which includes re-recorded versions of songs from the band's two previous releases, is the last release featuring keyboardist/vocalist Marty McMorrow, who was largely responsible for the band's post-hardcore sound and the initial success that came with it. His departure in 2008 would mark a major change in the band's sound, which became apparent in their debut album, Eyes to the Sun.

One music video was created for the album: the video for "Nurse! Nurse! (I'm Losing My Patients)" was released on January 15, 2007.

== Track listing ==
All songs written by Sparks the Rescue.

No.	Title	Length
1.	"Saco Boys Have No Class"	3:48
2.	"Getting Clean in the Dirty South"	3:34
3.	"Nurse! Nurse! (I'm Losing My Patients)"	3:41
4.	"The Runaway Romance"	3:37
5.	"The Scene: Your Bedroom"	3:01
6.	"The Young and the Restless"	5:10
Total length:		22:51
