= The Dangerous Summer (band) =

Rock band from Ellicott City, Maryland

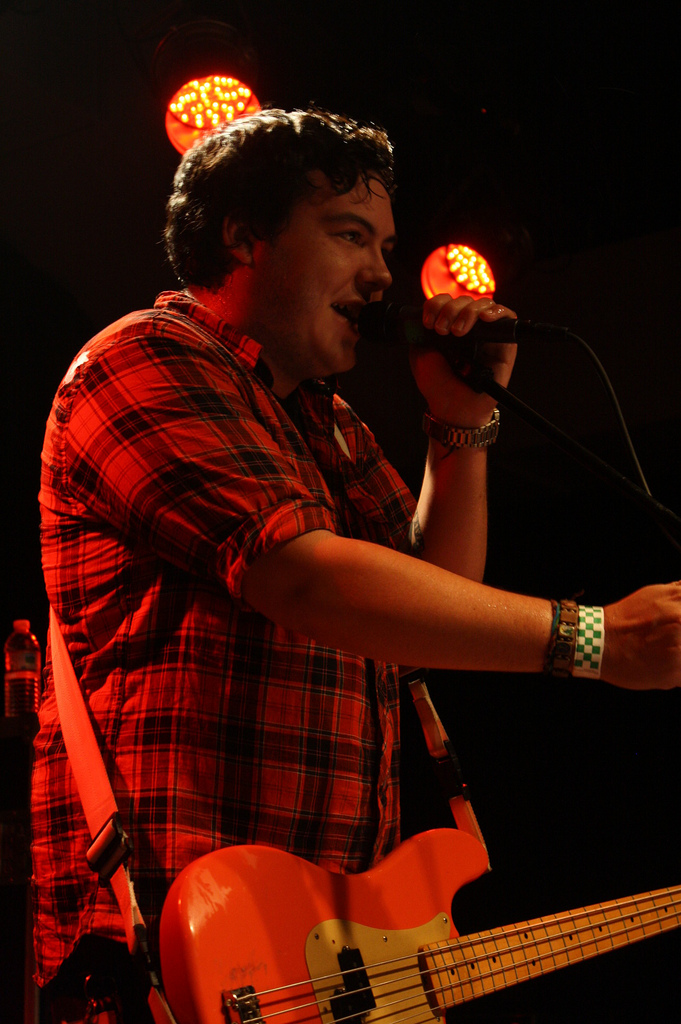
- Lead singer, AJ Perdomo, in 2010

Background information
- Origin: Ellicott City, Maryland, U.S.
- Genres: Alternative rock, emo, pop-punk
- Years active: 2006–2014, 2017–present
- Labels: Hopeless, Molly Water Music, Rude
- Members: AJ Perdomo; Josh Withenshaw
- Past members: Matt Kennedy; Cody Payne; Bryan Czap; Tyler Minsberg; Ben Cato; Christian Zawacki
- Website: thedangeroussummer.us

The Dangerous Summer is an American rock band from Ellicott City, Maryland, United States. The band's name is taken from the book of the same name by Ernest Hemingway. The band has stated influences from Third Eye Blind, Bright Eyes, U2, Phil Collins, Explosions in the Sky, Jimmy Eat World and Andrew McMahon. Over the years the band has sold over 60,000 albums and over 300,000 singles.

== History ==
The band formed in Ellicott City, Maryland, United States in summer 2006 to write their first EP, There Is No Such Thing as Science, which drew the attention of Hopeless Records and other labels in 2007. They signed with Hopeless Records in May 2007. They then re-released their debut EP under a new name, If You Could Only Keep Me Alive, in August 2007.

In April 2009, the band played The Bamboozle.

The band's debut studio album, Reach for the Sun, was released on May 5, 2009, and reached number 42 on the Billboard Heatseekers chart.

Their song "The Permanent Rain" was used in a trailer for the 2009 movie Love Happens, starring Jennifer Aniston and Aaron Eckhart.

An acoustic version of Reach for the Sun was digitally released on March 15, 2011.

The band's second album, War Paint, was released July 19, 2011. It reached 149 on the Billboard 200 on August 6, 2011 in its only week on the chart.

They played on the Warped Tour 2011 on the Nintendo 3DS stage.

The band finished their third album on February 26, 2013. They also began filming a documentary about the band and started a Kickstarter fund. The page hasn't been updated since 12 January 2014.

The album, Golden Record, was released on August 6, 2013. The first single, "Catholic Girls", was released on iTunes with an accompanying music video on June 4, 2013. In 2014, AJ Perdomo left the band, citing Cody Payne as the driving force behind the decision.

In February 2017, Cody Payne was sentenced to a year in prison after being charged with a felony burglary conviction. In July 2017, the band's Twitter account was wiped clean of all tweets and the profile picture and cover photo changed to static. On July 8, 2017, the band uploaded a video that read "Hello", followed the next day by a video hinting at an announcement on July 10. Additionally, Cody Payne posted on Facebook that the band would be reuniting without him.

On October 19, 2017, The Dangerous Summer announced their next album The Dangerous Summer, which was released on January 26, 2018, alongside a new single titled "Fire" from the upcoming album.

On February 19, 2019, the single "Where Were You When the Sky Opened Up" was released. The band's fifth album, Mother Nature, was released on June 14, 2019.

In 2020, The Dangerous Summer ended their tenure with Hopeless Records and dropped their first self-released song "Fuck Them All" on Molly Water Music. They recruited Aaron Gillespie to record the remainder of the EP.

In January 2022, Christian Zawacki from Virginia Beach took over on drums.

On April 29, 2022, The Dangerous Summer released their title track for their sixth full-length studio album Coming Home. The album released in August 26, 2022 through Rude Records. Two years later, they released the follow-up, Gravity. Both albums were recorded at The Bakery Recording Studio in Richmond, VA with legendary producer Will Beasley.

== Personnel ==
Current members

- AJ Perdomo – lead vocals, bass guitar (2006–2014, 2017–present)
- Josh Withenshaw – rhythm guitar (2022–present; touring 2018–2021), lead guitar (studio; 2023–present)

Current touring musicians

- Marcus Leopard – lead guitar (2023–present)
- Nick Pultz – drums (2025–present)

Former members

- Cody Payne – rhythm guitar, backing vocals (2006–2014)
- Bryan Czap – lead guitar (2006–2012)
- Etay Pisano – lead guitar (2012)
- Tyler Minsberg – drums, percussion (2006–2010, 2011)
- Ben Cato – drums (2012–2014, 2017–2020)
- Matt Kennedy – lead guitar, backing vocals, keyboards (2012–2014, 2017–2023)
- Christian Zawacki – drums (2022, 2023–2025)

Former touring musicians

- Doug Rogells – drums, percussion (Feb UK Tour)
- Kyle Jordan Mueller – drums, percussion (March 2011 US Tour, War Paint Tour 2012)
- Chris Kamrada – drums, percussion (Europe and UK Tour 2012)
- Alex Garcia – guitar (2018)

Timeline

== Discography ==
=== Studio albums ===
- Reach for the Sun (Hopeless Records, 2009)
- War Paint (Hopeless Records, 2011)
- Golden Record (Hopeless Records, 2013)
- The Dangerous Summer (Hopeless Records, 2018)
- Mother Nature (Hopeless Records, 2019)
- Coming Home (Rude Records, 2022)
- Gravity (Rude Records, 2024)

=== Acoustic albums ===
- An Acoustic Performance of "Reach for the Sun" (Hopeless Records, 2011)

=== Live albums ===
- Live in Baltimore 2019 (Hopeless Records, 2020)

=== EPs ===
- There Is No Such Thing as Science (2007)
- If You Could Only Keep Me Alive (Hopeless Records, 2007)
- All That Is Left of the Blue Sky (Molly Water Music, 2020)
