= Samiam =

American punk rock band

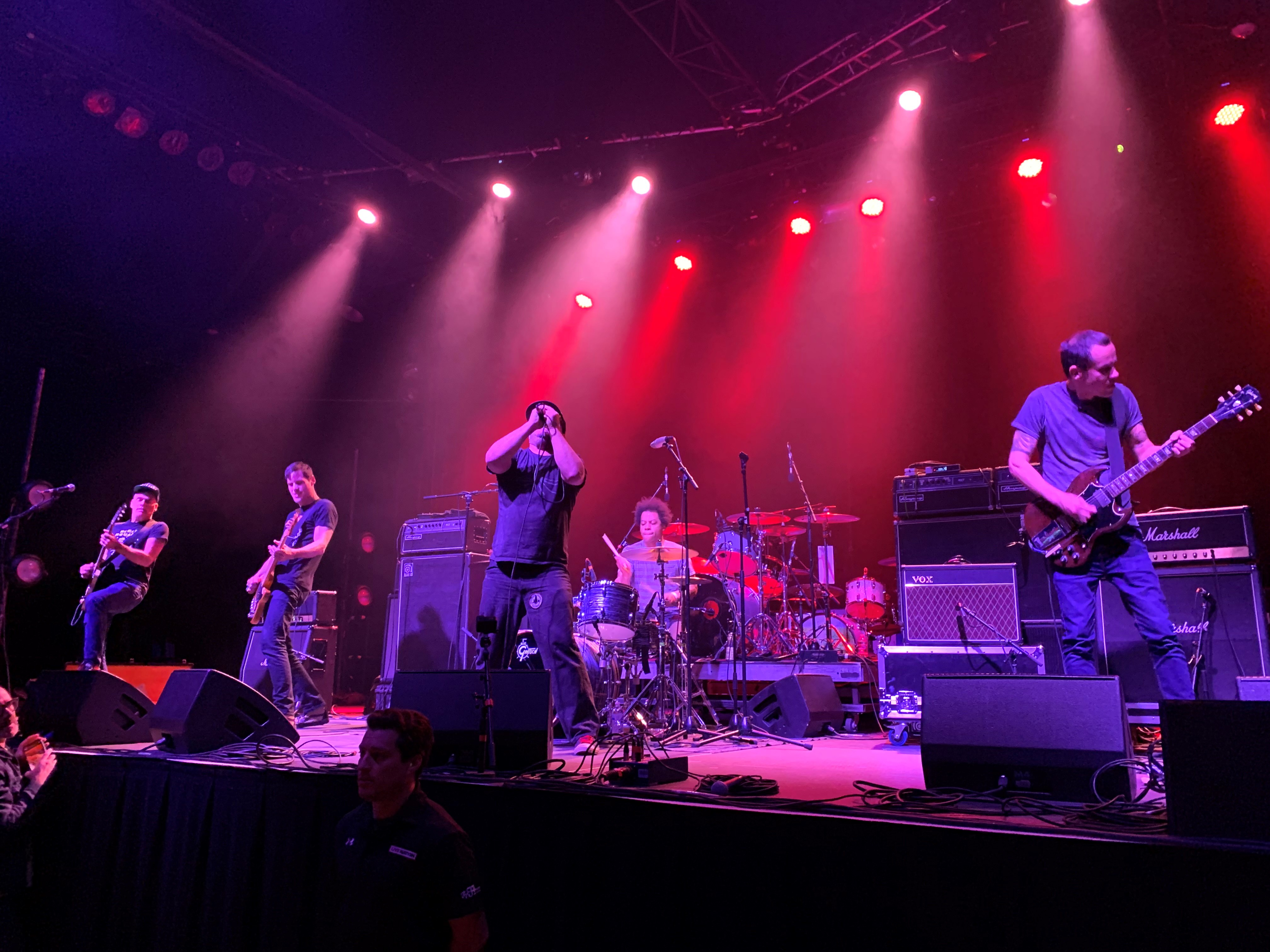
- Samiam performing at the Fillmore Auditorium in 2022 Left to right: Kennerly, Darby, Beebout, Brooks (behind drum kit), and Loobkoff.

Background information
- Origin: Berkeley, California, US
- Genres: Punk rock; hardcore punk; pop-punk; melodic hardcore; emo; emo pop
- Years active: 1988–present
- Labels: New Red Archives, Cleopatra, Atlantic, Hopeless, Your Choice, Burning Heart, No Idea, Dead Broke, Pure Noise, Golf
- Members: Jason Beebout; Sergie Loobkoff; Colin Brooks; Sean Kennerly; Chad Darby
- Past members: See below
- Website: Samiam on Facebook

Samiam (pronounced "sam-I-am") is an American punk rock band from Berkeley, California, active since 1988.

== History ==
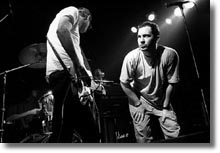
Samiam performing in 1991

Samiam was formed in late 1988 after the breakup of the band Isocracy, a Gilman club mainstay. Their first show was in January 1989 with Christ on Parade. They released records through New Red Archives and Hopeless Records in the US and Burning Heart Records in Europe.

Samiam signed to Atlantic Records in the 1990s when they faced the choice between breaking up and getting a record deal. Their major label debut Clumsy was released in 1994. Their video for single "Capsized" gained considerable airplay on MTV. Samiam performed on The Jon Stewart Show in 1994.

Samiam then recorded their followup to Clumsy, which Atlantic rejected. The album, You Are Freaking Me Out, was eventually released in 1997 by Burning Heart Records. Its single "She Found You" garnered considerable radio play in 1998.

Over the years, Samiam has toured extensively throughout Europe, North America and Japan, and performed with bands like Bad Religion, Green Day, The Offspring, NOFX, No Doubt, Toadies, Sense Field, Blink-182, Deftones, 311, Millencolin, and Fishbone.

In early 2001, the band went on hiatus after supporting the Astray album. Despite what was initially to be a breakup, they continued to tour abroad yearly (Europe and South America) with occasional shows in New York City, San Francisco and Los Angeles. This led to the recording of the band's seventh album Whatever's Got You Down, which was released in 2006. Samiam toured Europe three more times in 2006 and 2007 and played various US dates in 2008.

Samiam toured Australia in September 2009, together with the band A Death in the Family. This was followed by an appearance at The Fest in Gainesville, Florida in November 2009 and shows in Santiago, Chile; San Miguel, Argentina; and São Paulo, Brazil in December 2009. In 2010, the band released Orphan Works, a compilation of outtakes and live tracks from their time on Atlantic Records. October 2010 brought them together again with A Death in the Family for a European and East Coast tour.

Samiam released Trips, their first album in five years, on September 6, 2011. Semi annual tours have followed ever since in Europe, Australia and South America. In 2015, while in Chicago for an appearance at Riot Fest, a four-song demo was recorded but never finished.

In December 2019, Samiam announced on their Facebook page that they are working on their first studio album in eight years. The album, Stowaway, would be released in 2023, and featured guest vocals by Hot Water Music and the Draft singer Chris Wollard on multiple tracks.

== Musical style ==
The band's musical style has been described as punk rock, hardcore punk, pop-punk, melodic hardcore, emo and emo pop. Samiam's influences during their initial 1990s run included Leatherface, Snuff, Sonic Youth, Descendents, Bad Brains, Black Flag, Doughboys, the Lemonheads, Dinosaur Jr., the Replacements, Hüsker Dü, Swervedriver, and Short Dogs Grow.

== Members ==
Current members

- Jason Beebout – vocals
- Sergie Loobkoff – guitar
- Colin Brooks – drums
- Sean Kennerly – guitar, bass
- Chad Darby – bass

Past members

- Ryan Sullivan – guitar (1988–1989)
- Johnny Cruz – drums (1998)
- James Brogan – guitar (1988–2000)
- Martin Brohm – bass (1988–1993)
- Aaron Rubin – bass (1993–1997)
- Jeremy Bergo – bass (2006)
- Mark Mortinsen – drums (1988–1990, 1993)
- Dave Ayer – drums (1990–1993)
- Tré Cool – drums (1999)
- Scott McPherson – drums (1999)
- Victor Indrizzo – drums (1993–1995)
- Davey Latter – drums (1999)
- Michael Petrak – drums (1995–1999)
- Charlie Walker – drums
- Billy Bouchard – bass

== Discography ==
=== Studio albums ===
Title	Date of release	Record label(s)
Samiam	1990	New Red Archives
Soar	1991	New Red Archives
Billy	1992	New Red Archives
Clumsy	August 23, 1994	Atlantic Records
You Are Freaking Me Out	June 12, 1997	Ignition Records / Burning Heart Records
Astray	August 29, 2000	Hopeless Records / Burning Heart Records
Whatever's Got You Down	September 26, 2006	Hopeless Records / Burning Heart Records
Trips	September 6, 2011	Hopeless Records
Stowaway	March 31, 2023	Pure Noise Records

=== EPs and compilations ===
Title	Date of release	Record label(s)
Underground (EP) (All songs also on Samiam)	1989	New Red Archives
I am (EP)	1990	Lookout Records
Hardcore Breakout USA (v/a compilation) song: "Underground"	1990	New Red Archives
Beauf demo songs from Billy, Odds n' Ends	1991	Beri Beri Records - Europe
Very Small World (v/a comp) song: "At the Bottom"	September 1991	Very Small Records release No. 37 (VSR 14)
Split with Jawbreaker song: "Head Trap"	1992	No Idea Records; 7-inch came with No Idea Fanzine No. 10
LIVE (EP)	1992	Your Choice Records
Faces the Facts w/ Eight Ball, Rise & ABS (split 7-inch)	1992	OX Records
Don't Break Me (EP)	1992	New Red Archives
Stump (EP) acoustic	1992	Blackbox
Ping Pong Gods split with Garlic Frog Diet	March 22, 1996	Cargo Germany
Hardcore Breakout USA Volume 2 (v/a comp) song: "Go Away"	1995	New Red Archives
Glow split with Six Pack (part 4 of the Erase Yer Head split series)	1997	Pandemonium Records (France)
She Found You (EP)	July 16, 1997	Ignition Records / Burning Heart Records
Factory (single)	1997	Ignition Records / Burning Heart Records
At War With Society (v/a comp) song: "Underground"	1998	New Red Archives
Your Choice Live Series 037 split with Texas Is the Reason	June 4, 1999	Your Choice Records
Short Music for Short People song: "Long Enough to Forget You"	June 1, 1999	Fat Wreck Chords
Search & Destroy	August 23, 1999	Burning Heart Records
Mudhill (single)	2000	Hopeless Records
The New Red Years (comp) compilation of New Red Archives material	April 11, 2000	Golf Records
Orphan Works (comp) compilation of B-sides, lives and rarities	2010	No Idea Records / Unless You Try Records
Complete Control Session (comp) compilation of B-sides, lives and rarities	2012	SideOneDummy Records
