= Never Shout Never discography =

- Logo
- Studio albums: 8
- Extended plays: 11
- Live albums: 3
- Compilation albums: 1
- Singles: 21
- Promotional singles: 13

Never Shout Never is an American indie rock band, formed in Joplin, Missouri in 2007. The band has released eight studio albums, eleven extended plays, and 21 singles.

Never Shout Never released their first extended play Demo-shmemo on February 29, 2008. On July 29, 2008, they released their second extended play, The Yippee through Loveway Records. The second extended play produced one single, "30days". From then on, Never Shout Never released a third extended play, Me & My Uke (Loveway Records) on January 27, 2009 and a fourth, The Summer (Loveway Records) on June 23, 2009. The former produced the single "Trouble", which was certified Gold by the Recording Industry Association of America. The EP reached #57 on the Billboard 200. The fourth extended play produced two singles, "Happy" and "On the Brightside". On December 8, 2009, Never Shout Never released their fifth and self-titled (Sire Records) extended play. It produced the single "Big City Dreams".

Never Shout Never released their first studio album What Is Love? (Sire Records) on January 26, 2010. It reached #24 on the Billboard 200, #2 on the Top Alternative Albums and the Top Rock Albums charts. It produced "What Is Love?", "I Love You 5", and "Can't Stand It" as singles. On July 27, 2010, the band released their sixth extended play, Melody (Sire Records) and "Coffee and Cigarettes" was released as a single. Harmony (Sire Records) was released as the group's second studio album on August 24, 2010. Three singles were released that includes: "CheaterCheaterBestFriendEater," "This Shit Getz Old" and "Lovesick". On September 20, 2011, Time Travel (Sire Records) was released. "Time Travel" and "Simplistic Trance-Like Getaway" were the singles for this album.

They released non-album singles with the first, "Small Town Girl" released in early 2012. The second, "Till the Sun Comes Up," debuted in April of the same year. Their fourth studio album, Indigo, was released on November 13, 2012. Their fifth studio album, Sunflower, was released on July 2, 2013.

On March 3, 2015, Never Shout Never released their sixth studio album Recycled Youth, before following-up with a seventh studio album later in year on August 7, titled Black Cat. On June 12, 2020, with Christofer Drew being the sole member of Never Shout Never, released the eighth and final studio album, Unborn Spark.

As of 2010, they have accumulated 1.3 million downloaded song sales according to the Nielsen Soundscan.

== Albums ==
=== Studio albums ===
List of studio albums, with selected chart positions and sales figures
Title	Album details	Peak chart positions				Sales
Title	Album details	US	US Alt	US Rock	CAN	Sales
What Is Love?	Released: January 26, 2010; Label: Sire Records; Format: CD, digital download	24	2	2	58	US: 21,000
Harmony	Released: August 24, 2010; Label: Sire Records; Format: CD, digital download	14	—	—	—	US: 23,000
Time Travel	Released: September 20, 2011; Label: Sire Records; Format: CD, digital download	35	—	—	—	
Indigo	Released: November 13, 2012; Label: Loveway Records; Format: CD, digital download	194	—	—	—	
Sunflower	Released: July 2, 2013; Label: Loveway Records; Format: CD, digital download	—	—	—	—	
Recycled Youth	Released: March 3, 2015; Label: Sire Records; Format: CD, digital download	—	—	—	—	
Black Cat	Released: August 7, 2015; Label: Sire Records; Format: CD, digital download	52	3	6	—	
Unborn Spark	Released: June 12, 2020; Label: Kymica Records; Format: Digital download	—	—	—	—	
"—" denotes releases that did not chart or was not released in that territory.

=== Extended plays ===
List of extended plays, with selected chart positions and sales figures
Title	Album details	Peak chart positions				Sales
Title	Album details	US	US Alt	US Rock	CAN	Sales
Demo-shmemo	Released: February 29, 2008; Label: Self-released; Format: Digital download	—	—	—	—	
The Yippee EP	Released: July 29, 2008; Label: Loveway Records; Format: CD, digital download	—	—	—	1	US: 46,000
Me & My Uke	Released: January 27, 2009; Label: Loveway Records; Format: Digital download	—	—	—	—	
The Summer EP	Released: June 23, 2009; Label: Loveway Records; Format: CD, digital download	57	16	21	—	US: 46,000
Never Shout Never	Released: December 8, 2009; Label: Sire Records; Format: CD, digital download	—	—	—	—	
Verite	Released: June 25, 2010; Label: Loveway Records; Format: CD	—	—	—	—	
Melody	Released: July 27, 2010; Label: Sire Records; Format: Digital download	—	—	—	—	
EP 01	Released: August 24, 2010; Label: Sire Records; Format: CD, digital download	—	—	—	—	
Acoustic EP	Released: February 26, 2013; Label: Loveway Records; Format: Digital download	—	—	—	—	
The Xmas EP	Released: November 22, 2013; Label: Loveway Records; Format: Digital download	—	—	—	—	
Advent of Violett Soul	Released: November 25, 2016; Label: Independent; Format: Digital download	—	—	—	—	
"—" denotes releases that did not chart or was not released in that territory.

=== Live albums ===
List of live albums with selected details
Title	Album details
Never Shout Never & The Maine	Released: December 21, 2010; Label: Warner Bros. Records; Format: Digital download
Love (Live)	Released: February 14, 2011; Label: Self-released; Format: CD, digital download
To Pick a Town Up	Released: June 3, 2011; Label: Self-released; Format: Digital download

=== Compilation albums ===
List of compilation albums with selected details
Title	Album details
Year One	Released: April 12, 2011; Label: Self-released; Format: CD, digital download

== Singles ==
=== As lead artist ===
List of singles as lead artist, with selected chart positions and certifications
Title	Year	Peak chart positions					Certifications	Album
Title	Year	US	US Rock Digital	US Holiday Digital	CAN	LTH	Certifications	Album
"Big City Dreams"	2008	— (Note: "Big City Dreams" did not enter the Billboard Hot 100, but peaked at number one on the Hot Singles Sales chart.)	—	—	—	—		The Yippee
"Trouble"	2008	— (Note: "Trouble" did not enter the Billboard Hot 100, but peaked at number seven on the Hot Singles Sales chart.)	—	—	7	—	RIAA: Gold	Me & My Uke
"Happy"	2009	—	—	—	—	—		The Summer
"30 Days"	2009	—	—	44	—	—		The Yippee
"What Is Love"	2009	—	—	—	—	—		What Is Love
"I Love You 5"	2010	—	—	—	—	—		What Is Love
"Seewhatweseas"	2010	—	—	—	—	—		Almost Alice
"Can't Stand It"	2010	—	29	—	—	42		What Is Love
"Coffee and Cigarettes"	2010	—	—	—	—	—		Melody
"CheaterCheaterBestFriendEater"	2010	—	—	—	—	—		Harmony
"This Shit Never Getz Old"	2010	—	—	—	—	—		Harmony
"Lovesick"	2010	—	—	—	—	—		Harmony
"Time Travel"	2011	—	—	—	—	—		Time Travel
"Simplistic Trance-Like Getaway"	2011	—	—	—	—	—		Time Travel
"Small Town Girl"	2012	—	—	—	—	—		Non-album singles
"Till the Sun Comes Up"	2012	—	—	—	—	—		Non-album singles
"Hey! We Ok"	2015	—	—	—	—	—		Black Cat
"Red Balloon"	2016	—	—	—	—	—		Black Cat
"Time to Change"	2020	—	—	—	—	—		Unborn Spark
"Easy Swagger"	2021	—	—	—	—	—		Non-album singles
"Sunny Day"	2022	—	—	—	—	—		Non-album singles
"—" denotes releases that did not chart or was not released in that territory.

=== As featured artist ===
Title	Year	Album
"Blizzard of '89" (The Ready Set featuring Never Shout Never)	2009	Non-album single

=== Promotional singles ===
List of promotional singles, with selected chart positions
Title	Year	Peak chart positions	Album
Title	Year	JPN Air.	Album
"Silver Ecstasy"	2011	—	Time Travel
"Smelyalata"	2011	84	The Yippee EP
"Life Goes On"	2012	—	Indigo
"Magic"	2012	—	Indigo
"All Mine"	2012	—	Indigo
"Between Two Worlds"	2012	—	Indigo
"Hazel Eyes"	2012	—	Indigo
"Good Times"	2013	—	Indigo
"Subliminal Messages"	2013	—	Indigo
"Malibu"	2013	—	Indigo
"Knock, Knock"	2013	—	Indigo
"Everything is Cool"	2013	—	The Xmas EP
"Boom"	2015	—	Black Cat
"—" denotes a recording that did not chart or was not released to that territory.

== Music videos ==
Title	Year	Director(s)	Ref.
"Big City Dreams"	2008	Issac Ravishankara	
"On the Brightside"	2009	Unknown	
"What Is Love?"	2009	Issac Ravishankara	
"I Love You 5"	2010	Unknown	
"Can't Stand It"	2010	Isaac Ravishankara	
"Seawhatweseas"	2010	Isaac Ravishankara	
"Coffee and Cigarettes"	2010	Lester Cohn	
"cheatercheaterbestfriendeater"	2010	Unknown	
"i love you more than you will ever know"	2010	Unknown	
"This Shit Getz Old"	2010	Unknown	
"Lousy Truth"	2010	Unknown	
"first dance"	2010	Unknown	
"lovesick"	2010	Unknown	
"Sellout"	2010	Unknown	
"Trampoline"	2010	Unknown	
"Harmony"	2010	Unknown	
"Time Travel"	2011	Bob Bekian	
"Magic"	2012	Unknown	
"Under The Mistletoe" (featuring Dia Frampton)	2013	Megan Thompson	
"Wild Child"	2014	Unknown	
"Hey! We Ok"	2015	Geoffroy Faugérolas	
"Peace Song"	2015	Gus Black	
"Red Balloon"	2016	Taylor Washington	
"Something"	2018	Kevin Deems	

== Other appearances ==
Title	Year	Album	Ref.
"Seawhatweseas"	2010	Almost Alice	
"Bohemian Rhapsody"	2010	Punk Goes Classic Rock	
