= Eat Me Raw =

US musical group

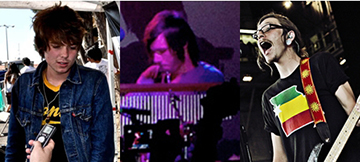
- Christofer Drew; Hayden Kaiser; Taylor Macfee

Background information
- Origin: Joplin, Missouri, U.S.
- Genres: Post-hardcore; pop punk; metalcore; experimental
- Years active: 2008–2019
- Label: Loveway
- Spinoff of: Never Shout Never
- Past members: Christofer Drew; Hayden Kaiser; Caleb Denison; Nathan Elison; Dustin Dobernig; Taylor MacFee; Lucas Kemper

Eat Me Raw (formerly Eatmewhileimhot!) was an American experimental band, formed in Joplin, Missouri in 2008. The band released two albums and two extended plays. Members of the band were better known for performing as the indie rock band Never Shout Never.

== History ==
In 2008, members of the indie rock band Never Shout Never formed a post-hardcore side project called EatMeWhileImHot!. The project originally started as a joke, but soon developed into a serious band. Songs like CoughKidCough, IBeatGirlsAtSports, and IHitASquirrelItChangedMyLife were released on MySpace. As the songs were released the band got more and more popular, and the members began to take it seriously. During this time, the band also changed their name to Mister Owl.

The group released their debut extended play, All My Friends, on July 7, 2009, as Mister Owl. The song "The Point" was released as a single on 200 limited edition CD-Rs on Never Shout Never's tour with the band, Hellogoodbye. To support their new EP, the group started to perform shows as Mister Owl in the winter of 2009. The song, "xBURRITOx" was released as a digital single on December 11.

The band name was changed from Mister Owl to Eatmewhileimhot! when Owl City’s management thought the name was too similar to theirs. With their new name, the band began to record their debut album. xALBUMx was released on July 26, 2010. 300 limited editions physical editions of the album were released through an online preorder. The album received mostly negative reviews from critics, but still charted 46th on the Billboard Heatseeker Albums chart. The non-album single, "Get Up and Die" was digitally released on January 4, 2011. After the release of the album, the band went on an unofficial hiatus to work on Never Shout Never's Time Travel.

Eatmewhileimhot returned at the end of 2011 with the single, "Damn Straight". The exclamation point in the band name was dropped. On March 2, 2012, their second album, Mushroom, was released. The album features an extreme metal sound rather than the experimental punk genres the band employed on every other release.. It received mostly negative reviews and did not chart. Four music videos were filmed for the album's songs.

They later changed their name to Eat Me Raw and were in the process of writing an album with the working title 'Mucus'. The band likely disbanded as Ingle announced in December 2018 that Never Shout Never would dissolve after a small tour in Mexico and Brazil.

== Band members ==
- Christofer Drew – vocals, guitar, percussion, programming (2008–2019), keyboards, synthesizers (2009–2019), drums (2010–2019), bass (2017–2019)
- Hayden Kaiser – guitars, backing vocals (2008–2018), drums (2010–2018)
- Caleb Denison – guitars (2008–2011), drums (2010–2011)
- Nathan Elison – drums (2008–2010)
- Dustin Dobernig – keyboards, synthesizers (2008–2009)
- Taylor MacFee – bass, backing vocals (2008–2017)

== Discography ==
Albums

- xALBUMx (2010)
- Mushroom (2012)

EPs

- All My Friends (2009)
- Untitled (2017)
- EATMERAW (2024)

Compilations

- Take Action, Vol. 9 (2010)
