= Trouble (Never Shout Never song) =

Single by Never Shout Never

from the EP Me & My Uke
- Released: December 29, 2008
- Studio: Engaged Audio
- Genre: Acoustic; indie rock
- Length: 2:25
- Label: Loveway
- Songwriter: Christofer Drew
- Producers: Kevin Gates; Drew

Never Shout Never singles chronology
"Big City Dreams" (2008)	"Trouble" (2008)	"30 Days" (2009)

"Trouble" is a song by American indie rock band, Never Shout Never. It was released on December 29, 2008, as the only single from their third EP Me & My Uke. The song has been labelled as Never Shout Never's "breakout hit." The song peaked at number seven on the US Billboard Hot Singles Sales chart and was certified Gold by the RIAA in May 2012.

== Background and composition ==
The song was first released on December 29, 2008, via his MySpace page. A lyrics video for the song was released on November 11, 2011.

"Trouble" was written and produced by Christofer Drew. The track runs at 120 BPM and is in the key of B major to E major. Drew's range in the song spans from the notes D4 to D6. The song was recorded in a day at Engaged Audio Studios in Springfield, Missouri and was co-produced by Kevin Gates.

In a 2012 interview with Alter the Press!, Drew stated that the band was going to re-record the song for their fourth studio album, Indigo, however never made the final cut. The song was also supposed to be recorded in seventh chord. He described the track as fun, upbeat and that it has "a super Beatles vibe."

== Critical reception ==
Alternative Press described the track as "iconic" and called Drew's vocals "beautifully soothing."

== Track listing ==
Digital download
No.	Title	Length
1.	"Trouble"	2:25

== Personnel ==
Credits for "Trouble" adapted from album's liner notes.

- Christofer Drew – composer, lyricist, producer, vocals, ukulele
- Kevin Gates – co-producer, mixing
- Michael Fossenkemper – mastering

== Charts ==
Chart performance for "Trouble"
Chart (2009)	Peak position
Canada (Nielsen Soundscan)	7
US Hot Singles Sales (Billboard)	7

== Certifications ==
Certifications and sales for "Trouble"
Region	Certification	Certified units/sales
United States (RIAA)	Gold	500,000^{*}
^{*} Sales figures based on certification alone.

== Release history ==
Release dates and formats for "Trouble"
Region	Date	Format	Label	Ref.
United States	December 29, 2008	Streaming	Loveway	
Various	2010	Digital download	Sire; Warner	
United States	April 29, 2011	Digital download	Sire; Warner	
