= What Is Love? (Never Shout Never album) =

Studio album by Never Shout Never
- Released: January 26, 2010
- Studio: Abbey Road Studios, London
- Length: 20:36
- Label: Loveway Records; Sire; Warner Bros.
- Producer: Butch Walker

Never Shout Never chronology
Never Shout Never (2009)	What Is Love? (2010)	Harmony (2010)

Singles from What Is Love?
- 1. "What Is Love?" Released: December 15, 2009; 2. "I Love You 5" Released: February 4, 2010; 3. "Can't Stand It" Released: March 4, 2010

What Is Love? is the first studio album by American rock band Never Shout Never, released on January 26, 2010, via Loveway, Sire and Warner Bros. Records.

The album debuted at No. 24 on the Billboard 200 and sold 21,000 copies in its first week of its release.

== Background and release ==
On May 29, 2009, Never Shout Never signed to Warner Bros. Records. The album was produced by Butch Walker and was recorded in Los Angeles and at Abbey Road Studios in London. On December 3, 2009, Never Shout Never revealed the release date and track list of the album. On December 8, a self-titled EP was released, featuring two songs, "Jane Doe" and "What is Love?" as a preview for the upcoming debut album, as well as a B-side titled "She's Got Style" and a live version of "Big City Dreams".

The 20-minute mini album was written from a "panoramic view of teen angst" about family, politics, drugs, religion, heartbreak. Explaining his decision on keeping the album relatively short, frontman Christofer Drew stated, "I think it's easier for kids to concentrate that way."

The first single "What Is Love?" was released on December 15, 2009. The music video was released in December 2009, directed by Isaac Ravishankara. "I Love You 5" was released on February 4, 2010, as the second single with the music video being released 2 days prior. "Can't Stand It" was released on March 4, 2010, as the third and final single along with its music video that same day directed by Isaac Ravishankara. The video includes visual references of Bob Dylan's, Dont Look Back and The Beatles, A Hard Day's Night. The song peaked at number 29 on the Billboard Rock Digital Song Sales chart.

== Promotion ==
In support of the album, the group performed eight live shows in December 2009. Christofer Drew also went on a solo acoustic tour in January 2010. The group headlined the Alternative Press AP Tour in the spring of 2010 with support from Joplin, The Cab, Hey Monday, Every Avenue and The Summer Set.

== Critical reception ==
Professional ratings
Aggregate scores
Source	Rating
Metacritic	55/100
Review scores
Source	Rating
AllMusic	2/5 stars
Alternative Press	3.5/5 stars
Rolling Stone	2.5/5 stars

On Metacritic, which assigns a rating out of 100 to reviews from mainstream critics, the album gained an average score of 55, based on 4 reviews, indicating "mixed to average reviews". The album was given a 2 star rating from Andrew Leahey of AllMusic. He complimented Drew's ability to write a pop melody however was critical of his vocals stating, "it's too hampered by pinched, nasal vocals to make much of an impression." Scott Heisel of Alternative Press wrote, "while it is all good in the Never Shout Never camp, it's going to get better, faster than everyone thinks." Christian Hoard of Rolling Stone gave the album a more negative review stating, "Drew took some bad lessons from emo and his dad's folk records. The vocals are often pained and piercing, and his manner can be gratingly precious – especially on 'Can't Stand It'."

== Track listing ==
All tracks are written by Christofer Drew Ingle.

No.	Title	Length
1.	"Love Is Our Weapon"	2:28
2.	"Jane Doe"	1:55
3.	"Can't Stand It"	2:50
4.	"Sacrilegious"	1:51
5.	"I Love You 5"	2:14
6.	"California"	2:37
7.	"What Is Love?"	2:34
8.	"The Past"	4:07
Total length:		20:36

iTunes bonus tracks
No.	Title	Length
9.	"Fifteen"	1:30
10.	"Damn Dog"	2:17
11.	"Can't Stand It" (music video)	2:46

== Personnel ==
Credits for What Is Love? adapted from AllMusic.

Musicians

- Christofer Ingle Drew – instrumentation, vocals
- Caleb Denison – bass, electric guitar
- Dustin Dobernig – piano, keyboards
- Nathan Ellison – percussion, drums
- Butch Walker – backing vocals

Production

- Christofer Ingle Drew – photography
- Craig Aaronson – A&R
- Jonathan Allen – engineer
- Thomas Bowes – concert master
- Lori Casteel – music preparation
- Mike Casteel – music preparation
- Vic Fraser – music preparation
- Isobel Griffiths – string contractor
- Joe Kaplan – mixing
- Andrew Kitchen – assistant
- Frank Maddocks – design – photography
- Rob Mathes – string arrangement, string conductor
- Dave McNair – mastering
- Perry Montague-Mason – concert master
- Jake Sinclair – engineer
- Butch Walker – producer
- Perry Watts-Russell – A&R

== Charts ==
Chart performance for What Is Love?
Chart (2010)	Peak position
Canadian Albums (Billboard)	58
US Billboard 200	24
US Top Rock Albums (Billboard)	2
US Top Alternative Albums (Billboard)	2
