= The Yippee EP =

EP by Never Shout Never
- Released: July 29, 2008
- Genre: Pop rock; indie rock
- Length: 12:01
- Label: Loveway Records; Kurofune Records
- Producer: Christofer Drew

Never Shout Never chronology
Demo-shmemo (2008)	The Yippee EP (2008)	Me & My Uke (2009)

Singles from The Yippee EP
- 1. "Big City Dreams" Released: July 18, 2008; 2. "30 Days" Released: June 30, 2009

The Yippee EP is the second extended play recorded by American indie rock band Never Shout Never. It was released on July 29, 2008, via Loveway Records. The EP has sold 46,000 copies in the US as of February 2010. A Japanese edition of the EP containing two bonus tracks, "Uraltalk" and "30 Days", was released on December 17, 2008, via Kurofune Records.

== Background and recording ==
The EP was written and produced by Christofer Drew. On June 2, 2008, Never Shout Never announced that recording for The Yippee EP was finished, and was expected to be released in late July. It was released on July 29, 2008. The EP comprises four tracks, with songs written about love such as "Big City Dreams" and "Dare4distance". Musically, the EP features the pop-sounding "Heregoesnothin" and the experimental "Smelyalata", blending folk pop and dance pop. In support of the EP, Never Shout Never embarked on a US tour with Jamestown Story, Owl City and Handshakes and Highfives from July to August.

== Release ==
"Big City Dreams" was released on July 18, 2008. It was the first single released from the EP, where he performed it live on MTV TRL on July 31. The song peaked at number one on the Billboard Hot Singles Sales chart. The music video for "Big City Dreams" was directed by Isaac Ravishankara. The second single "30 Days" was released on June 30, 2009, via his MySpace page. It was released through digital music services on July 3. The song peaked at number 44 on the Billboard Holiday Digital Song Sales chart. "Smelyalata" was released as a free download in 2011.

== Commercial performance ==
The Yippee EP peaked at number one in Canada, and spent 63 weeks on the chart.

== Track listing ==
All tracks are written by Christofer Drew.

Digital download
No.	Title	Length
1.	"Heregoesnothin"	3:26
2.	"Bigcitydreams"	3:12
3.	"Smelyalata"	2:35
4.	"Dare4distance"	2:47
Total length:		12:01

CD special edition
No.	Title	Length
5.	"Uraltalk"	3:11
6.	"Overtheyears (Demo)"	2:45

Japanese edition
No.	Title	Length
5.	"Uraltalk"	3:11
6.	"30days"	3:11

== Personnel ==
Credits adapted from album's liner notes.

- Christofer Drew Ingle – vocals, guitar, bass, piano, keyboards, ukulele, drums
- Kevin Gates – mixing, mastering

== Charts ==
Chart performance for The Yippee EP
Chart (2009)	Peak position
Canadian Albums Sales (Nielsen)	1
US Singles Sales (Nielsen)	1

=== Singles ===
Title	Year	Peak chart positions	
Title	Year	US Hol Dig.	US Hot
"Big City Dreams"	2008	—	1
"30 Days"	2009	29	—
"—" denotes releases that did not chart.

== Release history ==
Release dates and formats for The Yippee EP
Region	Date	Format	Label	Ref.
United States	July 29, 2008	CD	Loveway Records	
Japan	December 17, 2008	CD	Kurofune Records	
Various	July 3, 2009	Digital download	Loveway Records	
