= Hey! We Ok =

Single by Never Shout Never

from the album Black Cat
- Released: June 9, 2015
- Studio: DTLA Recording, Los Angeles, California
- Genre: Pop punk
- Length: 3:03
- Label: Warner
- Songwriters: Ian Crawford; Dennis Herring; Christofer Drew
- Producer: Herring

Never Shout Never singles chronology
"Till the Sun Comes Up" (2012)	"Hey! We Ok" (2015)	"Red Balloon" (2016)

Music video
- "Hey! We Ok" on Vimeo

"Hey! We Ok" is a song by American indie rock band, Never Shout Never. It was released on June 9, 2015, as the lead single from their seventh studio album Black Cat via Warner Records.

== Background ==
"Hey! We Ok" was written by Christofer Drew, Ian Crawford and Dennis Herring while production was handled by Herring. The track runs at 100 BPM and is in the key of C-sharp major. A 15-second teaser was released a day before the song came out. Singer Christofer Drew explained the meaning and writing behind the song.

"You know we wrote that song in the park and we came up with some chords and we thought that we would write a song about dorks as we are dorks ourselves. We wanted to write a song for anyone that felt like an outcast and make it so we help people feel better about themselves."

== Critical reception ==
Jeff Niesel of the Riverfront Times stated, "The album's opening track, the snotty 'Hey! We OK', features a piano riff and call-and-response vocals. It's a righteous anti-anthem dedicated to anyone who feels like he or she just doesn't fit in." Alternative Press remarked, "it implores you to shout along every word while listening to it. It has a pop-punk vibe but still has the upbeat melody that the band are best known for."

== Music video ==
A music video for "Hey! We Ok" was released on August 5, 2015, and was directed by Geoffroy Faugérolas.

== Awards and nominations ==
Awards and nominations for "Hey! We Ok"
Year	Organization	Award	Result	Ref(s)
2016	Alternative Press Music Awards	Song of the Year	Nominated	

== Personnel ==
Credits for "Hey! We Ok" adapted from AllMusic.

Never Shout Never

- Christofer Drew – composer, guitar, percussion, vocals
- Ian Crawford – backing vocals, composer, guitar, percussion
- Hayden Kaiser – backing vocals, drums, percussion
- Taylor MacFee – backing vocals, percussion

Additional musicians

- Kenny Carkeet – bass, beats, keyboard
- Dave Elitch – drums
- Kiel Feher – drums
- Dennis Herring – composer, guitar, piano, programmer

Production

- Misha Hercules – assistant engineering, engineering
- Dennis Herring – producer
- Austin Keen – assistant engineering
- Stephen Marcussen – mastering
- Daniel Morton – assistant engineering
- Mark Needham – mixing
- Ben O'Neill – mixing engineering
- Csaba Petocz – engineering
- Kahlil Pipersburg – assistant engineering

== Release history ==
Release history for "Hey! We Ok"
Region	Date	Format	Label	Ref.
Various	June 9, 2015	Digital download	Warner Records	
