= Can't Stand It (song) =

Single by Never Shout Never

from the album What Is Love?
- Released: March 4, 2010
- Studio: Abbey Road Studios, London
- Genre: Indie pop
- Length: 2:50
- Label: Loveway Records; Sire; Warner Bros.
- Songwriter: Christofer Drew
- Producer: Butch Walker

Never Shout Never singles chronology
"Seewhatweseas" (2010)	"Can't Stand It" (2010)	"Coffee and Cigarettes" (2010)

Music video
- "Can't Stand It" on YouTube

"Can't Stand It" is a song by American indie rock band Never Shout Never. It was released on March 4, 2010, as the third and final single from their debut studio album, What Is Love?. The song peaked at number 29 on the US Rock Digital Song Sales chart.

== Background ==
"Can't Stand It" was written by Christofer Drew and produced by Butch Walker. The song was recorded at Abbey Road Studios. Lyrically, the song finds Drew gushing about girls who are "superduper cute."

== Critical reception ==
Scott Heisel of Alternative Press stated, "If Michael Cera and [Elliot Page] covered 'Can't Stand It' over the closing credits to Juno, Drew would have an indie-pop monument erected in his honor by the blogosphere." Christian Hoard of Rolling Stone remarked, "The vocals are often pained and piercing, and his manner can be gratingly precious — especially on 'Can't Stand It'."

== Music video ==
In March 2010, MTV began posting previews of Never Shout Never's music video for "Can't Stand It", uploading a behind the scenes video on March 1. The following day, photos from the video set were posted on the MTV website. On March 3, a 30-second sneak peek of the video was revealed. The official music video premiered via MTV the following day and was directed by Isaac Ravishankara. The video includes visual references of Bob Dylan's, Dont Look Back and The Beatles, A Hard Day's Night.

== Charts ==
Chart performance for "Can't Stand It"
Chart (2010)	Peak position
Lithuania (European Hit Radio)	42
US Rock Digital Song Sales (Billboard)	29
