= The Xmas EP =

EP by Never Shout Never
- Released: November 22, 2013
- Genre: Acoustic; pop
- Length: 15:01
- Label: Warner Bros.; Loveway Records
- Producer: Christofer Drew; Forrest Kline; Carlos de la Garza

Never Shout Never chronology
Sunflower (2013)	The Xmas EP (2013)	Recycled Youth, Vol. 1 (2015)

The Xmas EP is a holiday EP recorded by Never Shout Never, featuring three covers of Christmas songs, including Winter Wonderland and songs by John Lennon/Yoko Ono and John Prine, as well as an original song featuring Dia Frampton. The EP was released on November 22, 2013, via Warner Bros. Records and Loveway Records.

== Background and release ==
In October 2013, Never Shout Never announced that they would be releasing a Christmas EP on November 22, 2013. The EP contains three covers of Christmas songs and one original song. The album art was created by Christofer Drew. Drew produced and recorded the covers himself and collaborated with Dia Frampton on the original track "Under The Mistletoe". The track was written by Drew and Frampton, and was recorded in 24 hours. The rest of the EP was recorded in Drew's home. Drew explained why he chose to do a Christmas EP in an interview with Alternative Press.

"We were just thinking of something that was really low pressure, so we could get some music out and I could experiment a little more. I was trying to think of something I could do, and then Danny [Rukasin, manager] and I were like, 'A Christmas record would be cool.' I had a couple Christmas songs that I really liked. We put out one song in 2009 ['30 Days'], and the fans really liked that, as well. I think they really like the Christmas vibe."

On October 24, 2013, the group released the first promotional single from the EP, "Everything is Cool". On November 15, the band premiered the second promotional single, "Under the Mistletoe" featuring Dia Frampton. The group embarked on the Xmas Tour with support from The Downtown Fiction and Nick Santino.

== Critical reception ==
Propertyofzack.com stated, "The four song The Xmas EP sounds exactly like what one might expect a Never Shout Never Christmas album in 2013 to sound like. 'Winter Wonderland' features the sort of loopy psych-folk [...] 'Everything Is Cool' [...] gets a spare banjo-and-harmonica arrangement [...] and 'Happy Xmas (War Is Over)' splits the difference, as vocals swirl in eddies around a gently plucked banjo and sleigh bells."

== Track list ==
No.	Title	Length
1.	"Winter Wonderland"	2:48
2.	"Everything is Cool"	4:49
3.	"Under the Mistletoe (feat. Dia Frampton)"	3:47
4.	"Happy Xmas (War is Over)"	3:39
Total length:		15:01

== Personnel ==
Credits for The Xmas EP adapted from AllMusic.

Never Shout Never

- Christofer Drew – bass, banjo, drums, harmonica, guitar, lead vocals

Additional musicians

- Dia Frampton – composer, guest vocals, featured artist

Production

- Felix Bernard – composer
- Carlos de la Garza – producer
- Forrest Kline – producer
- John Lennon – composer
- Tyler Long – mastering
- Yoko Ono – composer
- Eric Palmqwist – mixing
- John Prine – composer
- Richard B. Smith – composer

== Release history ==
Release history for The Xmas EP
Region	Date	Format	Label	Ref.
Various	November 22, 2013	Digital download	Warner Bros.; Loveway Records	
