= Sunflower (Never Shout Never album) =

Studio album by Never Shout Never
- Released: July 2, 2013
- Genres: Indie pop, rock
- Length: 40:52
- Label: Loveway Records / Warner Records
- Producer: Christofer Drew

Never Shout Never chronology
Indigo (2012)	Sunflower (2013)	The Xmas EP (2013)

Sunflower is the fifth studio album by American rock band Never Shout Never. It was released on July 2, 2013 by Loveway Records. The album features the full band recording as a whole for the third time; the first being in Time Travel, the second on Indigo.

== Background and release ==
In May 2013, Never Shout Never revealed that their fifth studio album titled, Sunflower would be released on July 2, 2013. The group also unveiled the album art. The album art was painted by Christofer Drew. The band released the first promotional single, "Good Times" for streaming on May 23, 2013. On May 28, the group released the album's second promotional single, "Subliminal Messages" which premiered exclusively on PropertyOfZack.com. "Malibu" was released for streaming via PureVolume on June 4, as the third promotional single from the album. The album's fourth and final promotional single, "Knock, Knock" was released on June 18. The album was made available for streaming exclusively via Alter the Press! in June 2013.

== Track listing ==
Track listing according to iTunes.

No.	Title	Length
1.	"New Sound"	3:36
2.	"Good Times"	4:04
3.	"Wild Child"	3:06
4.	"I Need You"	3:06
5.	"Falling Up"	3:08
6.	"Subliminal Messages"	2:42
7.	"Aeroplane"	3:59
8.	"Sunflower"	3:01
9.	"Malibu"	2:22
10.	"Knock, Knock"	3:33
11.	"Old-Timer"	2:58
12.	"Ladybug"	2:37
13.	"Time Traveler Blues"	2:40
Total length:		40:52

== Credits and personnel ==
Credits for Sunflower adapted from AllMusic.

Never Shout Never

- Christofer Drew – composer, guitar, keyboards, percussion, lead vocals
- Hayden Kaiser – drums, percussion, additional vocals
- Taylor MacFee – bass, additional vocals

Production

- Christofer Drew – producer
- Jeff Smith – mixing, recording

== Release history ==
Release history for Sunflower
Region	Date	Format	Label	Ref.
Various	July 2, 2013	CD; digital download	Loveway Records	
Various	December 4, 2013	Cassette tape	Antique Records	
