= Never Shout Never =

American rock band

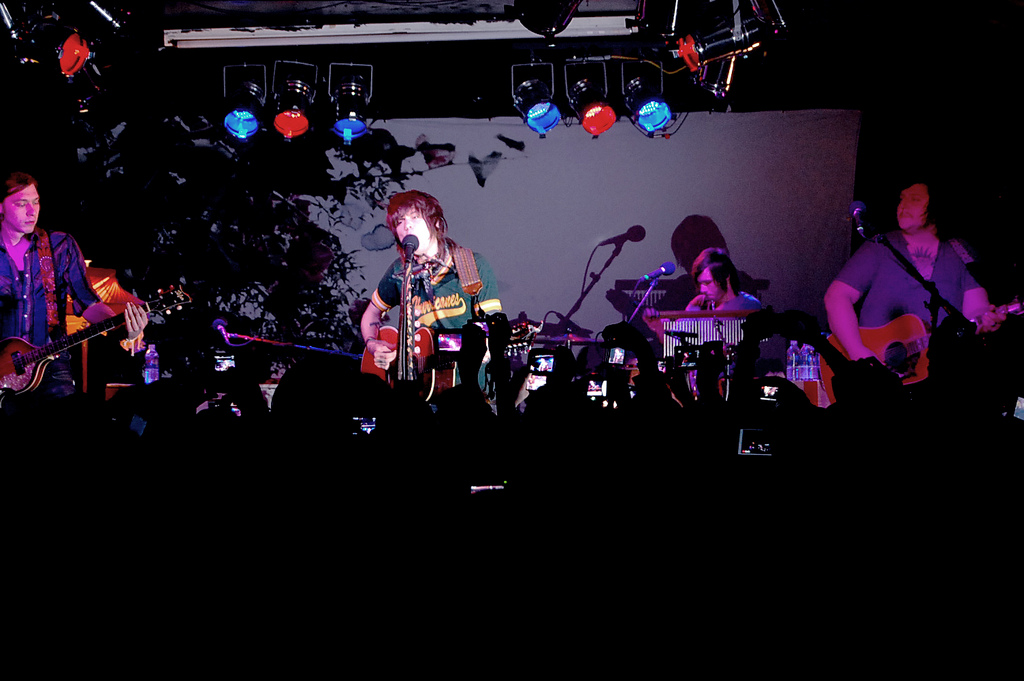
- Never Shout Never performing in 2009

Background information
- Origin: Joplin, Missouri, U.S.
- Genres: Pop rock; alternative rock; indie rock; emo pop; acoustic
- Years active: 2007–2019; 2020–2023; 2025
- Labels: Warner Bros.; Sire; Loveway; Kymica
- Past members: Christofer Drew; Ian Crawford; Taylor MacFee; Nathan Ellison; Dustin Dobernig; Hayden Kaiser; Caleb Denison; Tof Hoglen

Never Shout Never (originally typeset as nevershoutnever! and NeverShoutNever!) was an American rock band formed in Joplin, Missouri, in 2007. Vocalist and multi-instrumentalist Christofer Drew began the band as a solo project before expanding it to a band, whose best-known lineup included himself, bassist Taylor MacFee, and drummer Hayden Kaiser. The band that accompanied Drew when it was a solo project were originally known as "The Shout". Never Shout Never released eight full-length albums and nine EPs.

== History ==
=== 2007–2009: Formation and early career ===
Christofer Drew Ingle began making music under the alias nevershoutnever! in 2007, when he was 16 years old in his parents basement. His first exposure came through the internet, where he achieved success on Myspace before issuing the extended play, The Yippee EP on July 29, 2008, and selling 46,000 copies in the US. On July 30, 2008, he was featured on TRL, where he performed his debut single "Big City Dreams". The single peaked at number one on the Billboard Hot Singles Sales chart. To support the EP, he went on tour in the US with Jamestown Story, Owl City, and Handshakes and Highfives during the summer of 2008. He toured with Hellogoodbye and Ace Enders in the fall of 2008.

NeverShoutNever! released the lead single "Trouble" from his third EP, Me & My Uke on December 29, 2008. The song peaked at number five on the Hot Singles Sales chart. The song was later certified gold by the Recording Industry Association of America in May 2012. In January 2009, Me & My Uke was officially released.

NeverShoutNever! started touring with The Scene Aesthetic, The Honorary Title, and The Bigger Lights in late February 2009 and then toured with bands such as Forever the Sickest Kids, The Cab, and Mercy Mercedes, among others in spring 2009, as part of The Bamboozle Roadshow 2009. He played at both The Bamboozle Left 2009 and The Bamboozle 2009. In 2009, Never Shout Never won the mtvU Woodie Awards for Breaking Woodie.

=== 2009–2010: What Is Love and Harmony ===
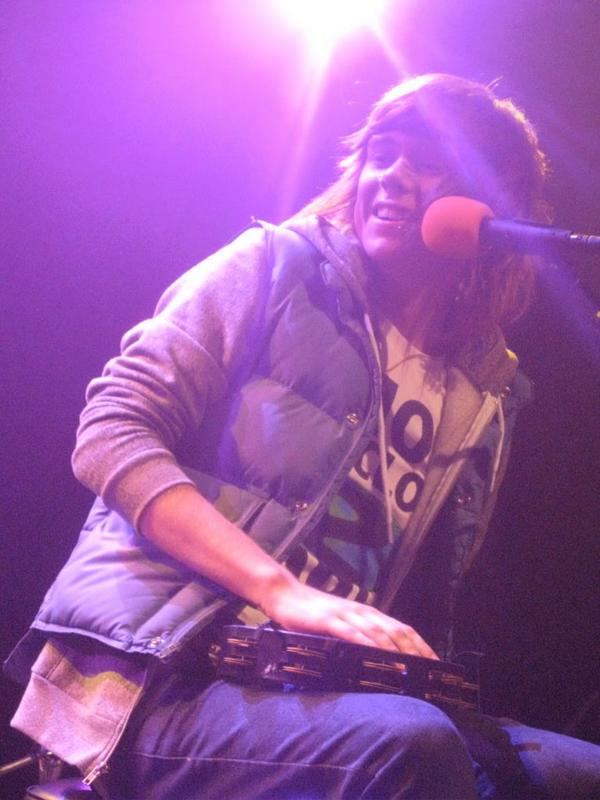
Christofer Drew performing with Never Shout Never in 2009

It was announced on May 29, 2009, that Ingle had signed to Warner Bros. Records, ending a major-label bidding war. As part of the deal, Ingle runs and make releases on his own imprint label, Loveway Records. Ingle's alias became officially stylized as Never Shout Never. Around this time, Never Shout Never also transitioned into a full band, with Drew recruiting his friends from Joplin, as his backing band. The Summer EP was Ingle's first release under Warner Bros. and was released on June 23, 2009. It sold 46,000 copies and the first single from the EP, titled "Happy", was released on iTunes on March 3, 2009. Production for Never Shout Never's debut album began in June 2009, where Butch Walker produced the album. The album was recorded in Los Angeles and at Abbey Road Studios in London. In July 2009, Never Shout Never performed at the mtvU Sunblock Festival. The band embarked on a headlining tour in October 2009, with Carter Hulsey and Now Now Every Children, before joining Dashboard Confessional on their headlining tour in November.

A self-titled EP, Never Shout Never was released on December 8, 2009, and featured two songs from their upcoming debut album ("What Is Love?" and "Jane Doe"), a re-recorded version of a song from The Yippee EP ("She's Got Style"), and a live version of a song from The Yippee EP ("Big City Dreams"). That same month, he was featured on a Christmas single by the Ready Set titled, "Blizzard of '89". The debut studio album from Never Shout Never, What Is Love?, was released on January 26, 2010. The album peaked at number 24 on the Billboard 200 chart and sold 21,000 copies. The album's first single, "What Is Love?" was released on December 15, 2009. "I Love You 5" was released on February 4, 2010, as the second single from the album. "Can't Stand It" was released on March 4, 2010, as the third and final single from the album along with its music video directed by Isaac Ravishankara. The song peaked at number 29 on the Billboard US Rock Digital Song Sales chart. The group headlined the Alternative Press AP Tour in the spring of 2010 with support from Joplin, The Cab, Hey Monday, Every Avenue and The Summer Set. Never Shout Never released a music video for "Seewhatweseas", which the song was featured on the soundtrack of Tim Burton's Alice in Wonderland.

Never Shout Never performed at the Vans Warped Tour in summer of 2010. The band released a digital EP on July 27, 2010, titled Melody, which contained three tracks: "CheaterCheaterBestFriendEater", "Coffee & Cigarettes" and "Lousy Truth". Their second studio album, Harmony, was released in August 2010. The album peaked at number 14 on the Billboard 200 chart and sold 23,000 copies in its first week. The band embarked on the VMA Tour with the Ready Set in August 2010. In September 2010, Never Shout Never performed on Late Night with Jimmy Fallon. On September 8, Never Shout Never released the demo track, "No Pain No Gain" for a free download. In October and November 2010, Never Shout Never co-headlined the Harmony Tour with The Maine, where the bands had fans gather can foods to help those in need. As a gift to the fans, they released a live split EP and was made available for free download on Never Shout Never's website. Never Shout Never won the AP Magazine Readers' Awards for Artist of the Year at the end of 2010.

=== 2011–2012: Time Travel and Indigo ===
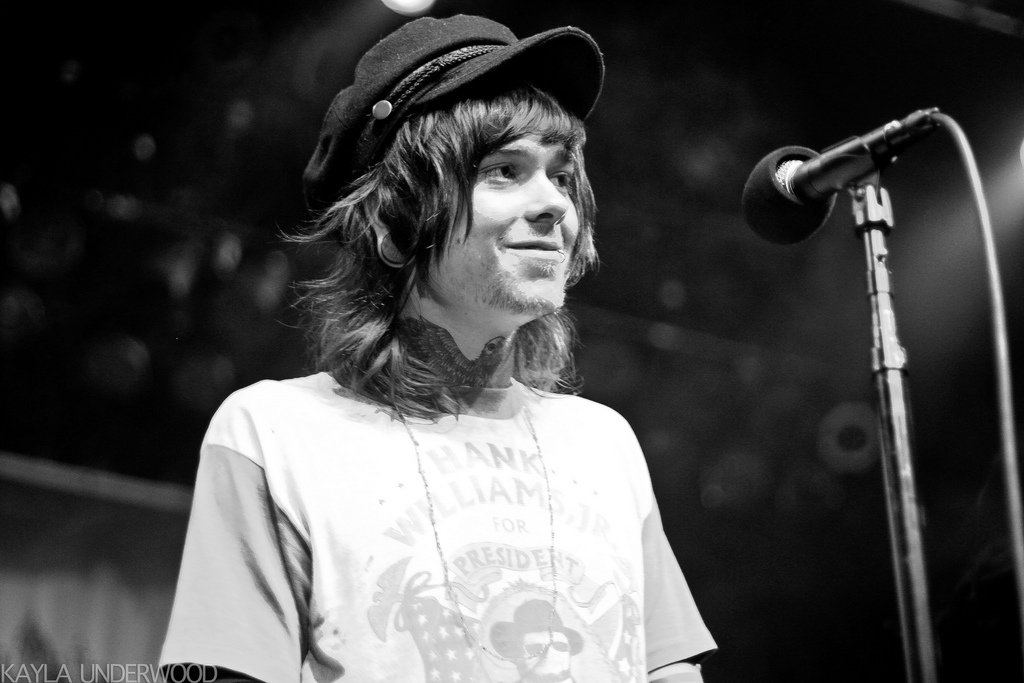
Christofer Drew performing with Never Shout Never in 2011

On April 12, 2011, Never Shout Never released the compilation album, Year One, featuring songs from Me & My Uke, The Yippee EP and Demo-shemo, as well as demo tracks. The band's hometown, Joplin, Missouri, was heavily damaged by a deadly EF5 tornado on May 22, 2011. Following the destruction, Ingle began a relief fund with United Way to raise $1.2 million for his hometown. To raise awareness about the devastation of Joplin, Ingle took video footage of the destruction and posted it on YouTube on June 1, 2011. The video, which features the song "Time Travel", encouraged viewers to donate to the relief of the town via his United Way fund. The song later went on to become the lead single from their third studio album on July 22, 2011. The album was recorded in Springfield, Missouri at the 2100 Studios. It is also the first album where Never Shout Never recorded as a full band. The album's second single "Simplistic Trance - Like Getaway" was released on August 26, 2011. Never Shout Never's third studio album, Time Travel was released on September 20, 2011. The album peaked at number 35 on the Billboard 200. In support of the album's release, they embarked on a fall headliner tour called The Time Travel Tour. The official music video for "Time Travel" was directed by Joey Boukadakis and was released in September 2011.

Ingle first revealed the title of the group's fourth studio album in an interview with Alter The Press! on May 8, 2012, and on September 20, via his Twitter account, he announced the release date of the band's new album Indigo. According to Drew, he wanted to record every song with a different producer, all in different cities, to give each song a unique feel and its own style. In support of the album's release, the band released five free tracks from their album through Alternative Press and Billboard. "Life Goes On" was the first track that premiered from the album on September 18. It was then followed up with "Magic", released on September 25. On October 30, "All Mine" was released. In November, "Between Two Worlds" and "Hazel Eyes" were both released. Never Shout Never's fourth full-length studio album, Indigo was released November 13, 2012. It debuted at 194 on the Billboard 200, a steep decline from the group's previous high of 14. The band toured the U.S. on the Indigo tour in late 2012.

=== 2013: Sunflower and The Xmas EP ===
In May 2013, Never Shout Never revealed their fifth studio album, Sunflower, which was released on July 2, 2013. The band released the first promotional single, "Good Times" for streaming on May 23, 2013. On May 28, the group released the album's second promotional single, "Subliminal Messages" which premiered exclusively on PropertyOfZack.com. "Malibu" was released for streaming via PureVolume on June 4, as the third promotional single from the album. The album's fourth and final promotional single, "Knock, Knock" was released on June 18. The band performed at Warped Tour in the summer of 2013. During the Warped Tour, Ingle had also teamed with BandHappy, an organization in which experienced musicians taught amateurs how to reach success. He had led a workshop in which a limited number of fans could ask questions and learn from him, with the addition of a one-on-one meet and greet.

A festive EP titled The Xmas EP was released on November 22, 2013. Drew produced and recorded the covers himself and collaborated with Dia Frampton on the original track "Under The Mistletoe". The song was released for streaming on November 15. The EP was recorded in Drew's home. The group headlined the Xmas Tour with support from The Downtown Fiction and Nick Santino in December 2013.

=== 2014–2016: Recycled Youth, Black Cat, and Departure of MacFee ===
In late 2013, Never Shout Never announced that the group was working on a new album called Recycled Youth, Vol. 1. The album featured re-worked songs from previous Never Shout Never releases. In January 2014, the band announced that the group had begun recording the album, and was expected to be released later that year. The album was the first installment of what Drew envisioned to be a three part collection of re-recorded fan and band favorites. It was produced by Eric Palmquist in Los Angeles, California. In June 2014, Never Shout Never announced that Ian Crawford joined the band as the lead guitarist. Recycled Youth, Vol. 1 was released on March 3, 2015.

On June 9, 2015, it was announced that Never Shout Never would be releasing their seventh studio album, Black Cat on August 7, 2015. The first single off of the album, titled "Hey! We Ok", was released the same day. The album was recorded in the DTLA Recording Studio in Los Angeles, California and was produced by Dennis Herring. On June 17, the group released "Boom!" as the first promotional single from the album. On July 16, the band premiered a new track titled, "Red Balloon" and was released as the album's second promotional single. The album peaked at number 52 on the Billboard 200. On November 24, 2015, Ian Crawford confirmed on his Facebook page that he had been let go from the band.

The band embarked on the Black Cat Tour in January 2016. "Red Balloon" was officially released as the album's second single on February 5, 2016. "Hey! We Ok" was nominated at the 2016 Alternative Press Music Awards for Song of the Year. The group headlined a US tour in June 2016 with support from Hundred Handed and Me Like Bees. On June 26, 2016, bassist Taylor MacFee announced his departure from the band. In November 2016, the group released their ninth EP, Advent Of Violett Soul.

=== 2017–2018: Cancelled studio albums and break-up ===
In June 2017, Never Shout Never performed at the 2017 Warped Tour. They later embarked on the Throwback Tour, as well as performing at the So What?! Music Festival. The tour lasted throughout 2017 where they played songs from earlier albums that likely wouldn't be played again. In April 2017, Drew revealed he had plans on releasing Never Shout Never's eighth studio album, Emerald Sun. He described the record as "conceptual," dealing with the theme of love. He stated, "It's something I wrote that I feel has a higher message behind it. It's the album I've been wanting to make — [it] portrays my heart and how I see the world." 13 tracks were written for the album. The album was expected to be released in the summer of 2018, but never made its way onto streaming services.

On March 23, 2018, the band released a cover of Elvis Presley's "Love Me Tender" on their upcoming cover album, All for Love, composed entirely of covers of love songs. On April 2, they released their cover of the Beatles' "Something". It is unlikely All for Love was finished and will ever be released. Drew continued to upload a handful of covers on YouTube during this time.

Ingle revealed in December 2018, that after a small tour in Mexico and Brazil the following month that Never Shout Never would disband. However, he reached out to fans via an Instagram post two days later asking if he should keep making music under the name. Despite the initial announcement, the band performed shows in Brazil and Mexico in early 2019. Following the final show in Brazil (with long-time drummer Hayden Kaiser absent) he stated he was uncertain of the band's future, but no official breakup announcement was confirmed.

=== 2020–2023, 2025: Unborn Spark, retirement ===
On April 29, 2020, Drew announced a solo acoustic album titled Unborn Spark, due for release on May 13, his son's 1st birthday. However, on May 5, he announced that he needed a little more time for mixing and artwork to be completed. On May 17, he announced that the album would be released on June 12. On June 8, the first single, "Time to Change", was released. With it came the announcement that it would be released as a Never Shout Never album.

Never Shout Never returned in late 2021, releasing a new single titled "Easy Swagger" in October. On March 8, 2022, Drew announced his retirement from music, putting an end to the band. In addition, Drew confirmed on Twitter that Never Shout Never was finished. However, on December 24, 2022, he announced that Never Shout Never would be returning the following year and also announced a release of a new album. On November 25, 2023, Drew announced via Twitter his second retirement from music, to pursue a new career in professional painting. He also released the final mixes of his intended album, Advent of Violet Soul on the same day. Never Shout Never was originally set to perform at When We Were Young in October 2025. However, on September 11, Drew announced that he would not be performing at the festival due to a mouth infection.

== Musical styles and influences ==
Never Shout Never is described as pop rock, alternative rock, indie rock, emo pop and acoustic. Additionally, Kerrang! referred to them as a "Myspace band" due to their popularity on Myspace early in their career, despite their stylistic disimilarities with other bands associated with this label, such as Job for a Cowboy and Suicide Silence. Ingle stated the band was influenced by Bob Dylan, The Beatles and Woody Guthrie.

== Band members ==
=== Former members ===
- Christofer Drew – lead vocals, guitars, bass, ukulele, violin, drums, percussion, piano, keyboards, synthesizers, programming, banjo, harmonica, (2007–2023, 2025)
- Caleb Denison – guitars, drums, percussion, backing vocals (2008–2011)
- Ian Crawford – guitars, backing vocals (2014–2015)
- Taylor Macfee – bass, backing vocals (2008–2016)
- Hayden Kaiser – auxiliary percussion, backing vocals, drums, guitars (2009–2018)
- Dustin Dobernig – piano, percussion, keyboards, violin (2009–2011)
- Nathan Ellison – drums, percussion (2008–2011)
- Tof Hoglen – keyboards (2016–2018)

== Discography ==
Albums

- What Is Love? (2010)
- Harmony (2010)
- Time Travel (2011)
- Indigo (2012)
- Sunflower (2013)
- Recycled Youth (2015)
- Black Cat (2015)
- Unborn Spark (2020)

== Awards and nominations ==
Year	Association	Category	Nominated work	Result	Ref.
2009	mtvU Woodie Awards	Breaking Woodie	Never Shout Never	Won	
2010	AP Magazine Readers' Awards	Artist of the Year	Never Shout Never	Won	
2011	PETA's Libby Awards	Most Animal-Friendly Band	Never Shout Never	Won	
2011	PETA's Libby Awards	Favorite Animal-Friendly Celeb	Christofer Drew	Won	
2011	PETA's Libby Awards	Sexiest Vegetarian	Christofer Drew	Won	
2016	Alternative Press Music Awards	Song of the Year	"Hey! We Ok"	Nominated	
