= Never Shout Never (EP) =

EP by Never Shout Never
- Released: December 8, 2009
- Recorded: 2009
- Genre: Acoustic, pop
- Length: 11:36
- Label: Loveway Records/Warner Bros. Records/Sire Records
- Producer: Butch Walker, Forrest Kline, Never Shout Never

Never Shout Never chronology
The Summer (2009)	Never Shout Never (2009)	What Is Love? (2010)

Singles from Never Shout Never
- 1. "Big City Dreams" Released: October 8, 2009

Never Shout Never is an EP by Never Shout Never which was released on December 8, 2009. The physical release is sold exclusively at Hot Topic. The EP features two songs from his then upcoming Sire Records full-length debut, What is Love?, one song that is a B-side from The Summer EP and one live track.

== Track listing ==
No.	Title	Length
1.	"What Is Love?"	2:34
2.	"Jane Doe"	1:55
3.	"She's Got Style"	3:08
4.	"Big City Dreams" (live)	3:49
Total length:		11:36
