= Black Cat (Never Shout Never album) =

Studio album by Never Shout Never
- Released: August 7, 2015
- Studio: DTLA Recording, Los Angeles, California
- Genre: Indie rock; alternative rock; pop rock
- Length: 34:45
- Label: Warner Bros. Records
- Producer: Dennis Herring

Never Shout Never chronology
Recycled Youth (2015)	Black Cat (2015)	Advent of Violett Soul (2016)

Singles from Black Cat
- 1. "Hey! We Ok" Released: June 9, 2015; 2. "Red Balloon" Released: February 5, 2016

Black Cat is the seventh studio album by American rock band Never Shout Never, featuring 10 tracks. It was released on August 7, 2015 through Warner Bros. Records.

== Background ==
On June 9, 2015, it was announced that Never Shout Never would be releasing their seventh studio album, Black Cat on August 7, 2015. Along with this announcement, he released the lead single from the album, "Hey! We Ok". Christofer Drew stated, "This is our first fully realized album. It felt like we had the training wheels on for a long time. I was a lot more open to ideas from other people than I ever have been which I feel is me hitting a certain maturity level... I think it's cool how it turned out; it's maybe more pop than we expected but I dig it." In support of the album, the band embarked on the Black Cat Tour in January 2016. The group later headlined a US tour in June 2016 with support from Hundred Handed and Me Like Bees.

== Composition and recording ==
Black Cat was recorded in the DTLA Recording Studio in Los Angeles, California and was produced by Dennis Herring. Drew described the album as a "pop record" and that pop music was the album's inspiration in production. Speaking about writing the songs, he stated, "We just wrote some fun hangout kind of songs, which was cool. I feel like we've been writing a lot of love songs still, which is just kind of a classic mood."

== Singles ==
"Hey! We Ok" was released as the first single from the album on June 9, 2015. It was nominated at the 2016 Alternative Press Music Awards for "Song of the Year". On June 17, the group released "Boom!" as the first promotional single from the album. On July 16, the band premiered a new track titled, "Red Balloon" and was released as the album's second promotional single. It was later released as the official second single from the album on February 5, 2016. A music video for the song was released on February 11, 2016. Drew stated that the song, "tells a story of a balloon that's alone, ashamed and tied down to all of its troubles and worries in the world."

== Critical reception ==
Professional ratings
Review scores
Source	Rating
AllMusic	3.5/5 stars
The Tech	3/5 stars

Black Cat was met with generally positive reviews from music critics. Matt Collar of AllMusic called the record, "their most mature and sonically sophisticated album to date." He stated, "Cuts like the leadoff 'Hey! We OK' and the driving 'Awkward Conversations (Best Day)' borrow the fuel-injected '70s power pop craftsmanship of classic bands like The Cars and Cheap Trick." Alternative Press remarked, "this is Drew's absolute career pinnacle, sporting everything from slice-of-life vignettes ('Fone Tag', 'Post Surrealism'), heartfelt sentiment ('All Is Love', 'Peace Song'), arena-rock pomp ('WooHoo') and straight-up weirdness ('Boom!'). The hooks are big, Drew's vocals are louder and prouder than previous releases and the songs (barring the occasional f-bomb) are commercial as hell." Charlie J. Moore of The Tech praised Drew's vocals but criticized the lyrics and called some tracks, "borderline boring."

== Track listing ==
Track listing according to iTunes.

No.	Title	Length
1.	"Hey! We Ok"	3:03
2.	"Fone Tag"	3:31
3.	"Red Balloon"	3:30
4.	"Happy New Year"	3:28
5.	"Awkward Conversations (Best Day)"	3:28
6.	"Black Cat"	4:09
7.	"Peace Song"	3:59
8.	"WooHoo"	3:08
9.	"Boom!"	2:39
10.	"All Is Love"	3:50

== Credits and personnel ==
Credits for Black Cat adapted from AllMusic.

Never Shout Never

- Christofer Drew – bass, composer, glockenspiel, guitar, keyboards, percussion, programming, ukeke, lead vocals, background vocals, whistle
- Hayden Kaiser – background vocals, composer, drums, guitar, percussion
- Ian Crawford – background vocals, composer, guitar, percussion, piano
- Taylor MacFee – background vocals, bass, composer, percussion

Additional musicians

- Dave Elitch – drums
- Dennis Herring – background vocals, composer, guitar, piano, programming
- Jill Lamoureaux – additional vocals
- Kenny Carkeet – bass, beats, guitar, keyboards
- Kiel Feher – drums
- Mark Needham – synthesizer
- Misha Hercules – piano
- Simon Katz – beats
- Spencer Ludwig – trumpet

Production

- Austin Keen – assistant
- Ben O'Neill – assistant
- Csaba Petocz – engineering
- Daniel Morton – assistant
- Dennis Herring – mixing, producer
- Donny Phillips – illustrations
- Frank Maddocks – photography
- Jeff Sosnow – A&R
- Kahlil Pipersburg – assistant
- Mark Needham – mixing
- Misha Hercules – assistant, engineering
- Rachel Many – art direction, design
- Ryan Gilligan – mixing
- Stephen Marcussen – mastering

== Charts ==
Chart performance for Black Cat
Chart (2015)	Peak position
US Billboard 200	52
US Top Rock Albums (Billboard)	6
US Top Alternative Albums (Billboard)	3

== Release history ==
Country	Date	Label	Format
Various	August 7, 2015	Warner Bros. Records	CD, digital download
