= The Summer (EP) =

The Summer EP

EP by Never Shout Never
- Released: June 23, 2009
- Studios: Engaged Audio; The Phantom Tollbooth
- Genres: Acoustic; pop
- Length: 16:13
- Labels: Warner Bros.; Loveway Records
- Producer: Forrest Kline

Never Shout Never chronology
Me & My Uke (2009)	The Summer EP (2009)	Never Shout Never (2009)

Singles from The Summer
- 1. "Happy" Released: March 3, 2009

The Summer EP is an EP by Never Shout Never, released on June 23, 2009. Originally, this release was supposed to be the band's debut self-titled full-length album. The EP was produced by Forrest Kline. The EP peaked at number 57 on the Billboard 200 albums chart on a charting date of July 11, 2009 and selling 46,000 copies.

== Background and release ==
On March 4, 2009, Never Shout Never announced the release date and track listing of the EP. It was recorded at Engaged Audio and The Phantom Tollbooth. "Happy" was released on March 3, 2009, as the first and only single from the EP. Originally scheduled for release in May, the EP was recorded at Engaged Audio and at the Phantom Tollbooth, the latter location being recorded with Forrest Kline. A music video for "On the Brightside" premiered on September 1, 2009.

== Critical reception ==
Professional ratings
Review scores
Source	Rating
AbsolutePunk.net	61%

Blake Solomon of AbsolutePunk.net gave a mixed review of the EP. He stated, "Drew's fine-tuned tenor is so smooth that it might breeze right by." He ended off remarking, "Drew will make plenty of teenage girls happy once his Warner Bros. contract kicks in, but I'd be lying if I said The Summer EP didn't brighten up my day."

== Track listing ==
No.	Title	Length
1.	"Happy"	2:36
2.	"Hummingbird"	3:05
3.	"I Just Laugh"	2:38
4.	"Simple Enough"	2:16
5.	"On the Brightside"	2:05
6.	"Losing It"	3:30
Total length:		16:13

iTunes edition bonus track
No.	Title	Length
7.	"Liar Liar"	3:10
Total length:		19:20

Special edition bonus tracks
No.	Title	Length
7.	"Liar Liar"	3:10
8.	"The Duet"	2:09
Total length:		21:29

== Personnel ==
Credits for The Summer EP adapted from AllMusic.

Never Shout Never

- Christofer Drew Ingle – Lead vocals, lead & rhythm guitars, bass, ukulele, piano, keyboards, synthesizers, programming
- Hayden Benton – Drums, backing vocals, guitars

Additional musicians

- Patrick Carrie – guitar
- Forrest Kline – bass guitar, keyboards

Production

- Jon Kaplan – mixing
- Forrest Kline – engineering, producer, programming
- Dave McNair – mastering
- Recorded at Engaged Audio and The Phantom Tollbooth

== Charts ==
Chart performance for The Summer
Chart (2009)	Peak position
US Billboard 200	57
US Top Rock Albums (Billboard)	21
US Top Alternative Albums (Billboard)	16
