= XALBUMx =

xALBUMx

Studio album by Eatmewhileimhot
- Released: July 27, 2010
- Recorded: 2008–2010
- Genre: Metalcore, experimental rock
- Length: 14:20
- Label: Loveway

Eatmewhileimhot chronology
All My Friends (2009)	xALBUMx (2010)	Mushroom (2012)

Singles from xALBUMx
- 1. "xVAMPIRESx" Released: September 9, 2009; 2. "xBURRITOx"/"xSMWHOREx" Released: December 11, 2009; 3. "xDESTROYx" Released: January 6, 2010

Professional ratings
Review scores
Source	Rating
AbsolutePunk	1/4 stars
Decoy Music	.5/5 stars

xALBUMx is the debut studio album by Eatmewhileimhot. It was released digitally on July 27, 2010. 300 physical editions were released through a preorder. This is the first and last album that Caleb Denison is featured on.

Despite receiving mostly negative reviews, the album reached No. 46 on the 'Billboard Heatseeker Albums chart.

== Singles ==
Two of the singles had different names when released. The songs were later renamed to go with the album's theme. "xVAMPIRESx" was "Vampiresliveinmybrain", "xBURRITOx" was "xXBurritoXx", and "xSMWHOREx" was "xXSmoreKillaXx".

== Track listing ==
No.	Title	Length
1.	"xDESTROYx"	1:54
2.	"xSMWHOREx"	1:31
3.	"xPIZZAx"	1:25
4.	"xGRIZZLYx"	1:51
5.	"xBICYCLEx" (instrumental)	1:43
6.	"xVAMPIRESx"	2:40
7.	"xMUSTACHEx"	1:48
8.	"xBURRITOx"	1:28

== Personnel ==
Eatmewhileimhot

- Christofer Drew Ingle – vocals, programming
- Taylor MacFee – bass
- Hayden Kaiser – guitar
- Caleb Denison – drums

== Charts ==
Chart performance for XALBUMx
Chart (2010)	Peak position
US Heatseekers Albums (Billboard)	46
