= Time Travel (Never Shout Never album) =

Studio album by Never Shout Never
- Released: September 20, 2011
- Recorded: December 2010 – May 2011
- Studio: 2100 Studios
- Genre: Acoustic rock; indie pop; psychedelic rock
- Length: 31:49
- Label: Loveway Records; Sire; Warner Bros.; Reprise Records
- Producer: Never Shout Never

Never Shout Never chronology
To Pick a Town Up (2011)	Time Travel (2011)	Indigo (2012)

Singles from Time Travel
- 1. "Time Travel" Released: July 22, 2011; 2. "Simplistic Trance-Like Getaway" Released: August 26, 2011

Time Travel is the third studio album by Never Shout Never. It was released on September 20, 2011. It was recorded in Springfield, Missouri. It is also the first album in which Never Shout Never recorded as a full band. The album debuted at number 35 on the Billboard 200.

== Background and recording ==
Following the 2011 Joplin Tornado on May 22, Christofer Drew began a relief fund with United Way to raise $1.2 million for his hometown. To raise awareness about the devastation of Joplin, Ingle took video footage of the destruction and posted it on YouTube on June 1, 2011. The video, which features the song "Time Travel", encouraged viewers to donate to the relief of the town via his United Way fund. The song was later included onto the album. The group recorded their third studio album in Springfield, Missouri at the 2100 Studios, where they also recorded the album for the first time as a full band. It was produced by the band. Drew felt the album was like a "rebirth" for the band and enjoyed having "the freedom to do exactly what he wanted."

== Composition ==
Time Travel is described by Drew as a concept album, wanting the record to feel "a little more trippy," and a thought the idea of travelling through time "would be awesome." Featuring more synth work on the record, Drew felt it was the "first stages of growth" for them, musically.

== Release ==
On July 13, 2011, Never Shout Never revealed the artwork, title and release date for the album. "Time Travel" was released as the album's lead single on July 22, 2011. The music video was released on September 21, 2011. Pre-orders for the album were available in August 2011, including limited editions of posters with Drew's handprint on it. The second single "Simplistic Trance - Like Getaway" was released on August 26, 2011. In September 2011, the band released a Studio Diary providing a behind-the-scenes look into the making of the album. Before the album's arrival, "Silver Ecstasy" was released as a promotional single on September 13, 2011. It was also streamed on Rolling Stone four days prior to its release. The album was officially released on September 20, 2011, and the group announced a fall headliner tour called, "The Time Travel Tour".

== Critical reception ==
Professional ratings
Review scores
Source	Rating
AllMusic	3/5 stars
Alter the Press!	5/5 stars
Dead Press!	7/10 stars
The Music	2/5 stars

The album was met with positive reviews from music critics. Gregory Heaney of AllMusic rewarded the album a 3 out of 5 star rating. He stated, "While spacy is a sound one would never think to associate with Never Shout Never, this latest incarnation of the project achieves just that, filling the songs with layers of swirling synthesizers and reverb that give them a real sense of atmosphere, and showcase the transformative powers of collaboration. The sound is a little too polished to mistake the band for the Flaming Lips, but by emo standards, the album is downright psychedelic." Alter the Press praised the album, remarking, "it becomes clear even to the musical layperson that the number of influences going into Never Shout Never is huge, even merging them together to create tracks like 'Robot' that appears to merge the styles of Radiohead, The Killers and MGMT [...] This truly comes across with a fiery passion that should be enough to persuade anyone that even by its third album, Never Shout Never is far from becoming stale." Devin Alessio of Girls' Life described the album as "if you crossed Jack's Mannequin's sound with the lyrics of The Maine," highlighting "Simplistic Trance-Like Getaway" and "Until I Die Alone" as the album's standout tracks. The Music wrote a mixed review for the album, calling it a "step forward in maturity compared to the previous release, 2010's Harmony." However, felt that "getting past Drew's stock standard punk pop voice and dreary lyrics is a big ask."

== Track listing ==
All tracks are written by Christofer Drew Ingle, except "Silver Ecstasy" composed by Christofer Drew Ingle, Caleb Denison and Hayden Kaiser (no history of Taylor MacFee).

No.	Title	Length
1.	"Time Travel"	5:37
2.	"Awful"	3:29
3.	"Silver Ecstasy"	3:19
4.	"Simplistic Trance-Like Getaway"	3:16
5.	"Robot"	4:44
6.	"Until I Die Alone"	4:12
7.	"Complex Heart"	4:16
8.	"Lost at Sea"	2:57

Bonus tracks
No.	Title	Length
9.	"Time Travel" (acoustic)	5:16
10.	"Silver Ecstasy" (acoustic)	3:20
11.	"Time Travel" (Andrew Goldstein Remix)	3:57

== Personnel ==
Credits for Time Travel adapted from AllMusic.

Never Shout Never

- Christofer Drew Ingle – Lead vocals, rhythm guitar, keyboards, piano, ukulele, programming, banjo, harmonica, creative director
- Caleb Denison – Drums, percussion, backing vocals, guitars
- Taylor MacFee – bass, backing vocals
- Hayden Kaiser – Lead guitar, backing vocals, percussion

Production

- David Beame – Legal advisor
- David Conway – Management
- Bradley Edwards – Artwork
- Dirk Hemsath – Management
- Daniel Hersch – Mastering
- Frank Maddocks – Creative director
- Xavier Ramos – Marketing
- Jeff Smith – Engineering, mixing
- Stephan Walker – Art direction, design

== Charts ==
Chart performance for Time Travel
Chart (2011)	Peak position
US Billboard 200	35

== Release history ==
Release dates and formats for Time Travel
Region	Date	Format(s)	Edition	Label	Ref.
Various	September 20, 2011	Loveway; Sire; Warner; Rise	CD; digital download	Standard	
Various	November 11, 2011	Loveway; Sire; Warner; Rise	Cassette	Limited edition	
