= Mushroom (album) =

Studio album by Eatmewhileimhot
- Released: March 2, 2012
- Recorded: 2011–2012
- Genre: Heavy metal, experimental, metalcore
- Length: 30:26
- Label: Loveway Records

Eatmewhileimhot chronology
xALBUMx (2010)	Mushroom (2012)

Singles from Mushroom
- 1. "Damn Straight" Released: December 9, 2011; 2. "Anti-Venom"/"Gates of Hell" Released: March 8, 2012; 3. "Judgement" Released: March 18, 2012

Mushroom is the second studio album by Eatmewhileimhot. It was released digitally on March 2, 2012. This is the first album that Caleb Denison is not featured on. The album received mostly negative reviews. Music videos were released for each of the four singles.

The album is influenced mainly by several genres of metal rather than the punk genres that the band's earlier material is composed of.

Professional ratings
Review scores
Source	Rating
Under the Gun Review	6.5/10 stars
Dead Press	6/10 stars
The Pit	4/10 stars

== Track listing ==
No.	Title	Length
1.	"Damn Straight"	3:29
2.	"Anti-Venom"	2:56
3.	"Gates of Hell"	2:26
4.	"Judgement"	2:49
5.	"Rock n' Roll"	3:10
6.	"Gargle-Oil"	2:59
7.	"Mushroom"	3:30
8.	"Vultures"	2:44
9.	"Demons"	3:21
10.	"Gods of Metal"	3:02

== Personnel ==
- Christofer Drew Ingle – vocals, guitar, programming
- Taylor MacFee – bass
- Hayden Kaiser – drums
