= Recycled Youth =

Recycled Youth Vol. 1

Studio album by Never Shout Never
- Released: March 3, 2015
- Length: 36:26
- Label: Warner Bros. Records
- Producer: Eric Palmquist

Never Shout Never chronology
| The Xmas EP (2013) | Recycled Youth Vol. 1 (2015) | Black Cat (2015) |

Recycled Youth Vol. 1 is the sixth studio album by American rock band Never Shout Never. The album was released on March 3, 2015, and features tracks previously released throughout the years.

== Background ==
On February 12, 2015, Never Shout Never announced their sixth studio album, Recycled Youth Vol. 1 which was released on March 3, 2015. The album contains nine re-imagined tracks of previously released songs recorded with entirely new styles and instrumentation. Recycled Youth was produced by Eric Palmquist in Los Angeles, California. The album was the first installment of what lead singer Christofer Drew envisioned to be a three part collection of re-recorded fan and band favorites. Drew stated he created the album for the fans who, "like to dive in deep." He also added, "The way I see it, a song is never completely finished. Re-imagined and evolved with each performance. This album is a revamp of some of my favorite NSN songs throughout the years." In February 2015, the group released the recycled version of "On The Brightside", exclusively via Alternative Press. On February 27, the album was made available for streaming via Alternative Press before its official release on March 3. Never Shout Never embarked on a US headlining tour called the Mid Winter's Nights Dream Acoustik tour from February to March 2015, with support from Hayley Kiyoko and Me Like Bees.

== Critical reception ==
Professional ratings
Review scores
| Source | Rating |
|---|---|
| The Daily Reveille | 3.5/5 stars |

Greta Jines of The Daily Reveille gave a positive review for the album stating, "there's a noticeable mix of styles throughout the album’s entirety. Some are eerie, some are upbeat and some are even a little twangy. Regardless of style, each track also feels richer and less acoustic." She described "On the Brightside" as a "vibe that feels almost cinematic." She also praised the tracks, "Black Hole (Liar Liar)", "Robot" and "Lost at Sea". However, she criticized the other tracks such as "Sacrilegious" and "Here Goes Nothing" stating, "It's almost as if the right idea for these two tracks was there, but the band never quite followed through, which will leave the listener disappointed. The strength of the album's other songs makes these two fail in comparison." She ended off noting, "Recycled Youth may strike a familiar chord with listeners, but it feels brand new. It's not often an artist revisits old material and changes the dynamic of songs which established the band, but if this is the result, it may not be such a bad idea."

== Track listing ==
| No. | Title | Length |
|---|---|---|
| 1. | "On the Brightside" | 2:56 |
| 2. | "Sacrilegious" | 3:21 |
| 3. | "Love is Our Weapon" | 3:00 |
| 4. | "Black Hole (Liar Liar)" | 3:57 |
| 5. | "Robot" | 5:49 |
| 6. | "Here Goes Nothing" | 4:32 |
| 7. | "Sweet Perfection" | 4:08 |
| 8. | "Trance-Like Getaway" | 5:03 |
| 9. | "Lost At Sea" | 3:48 |
| Total length: | | 36:26 |

== Release history ==
Release history for Recycled Youth
| Region | Date | Format | Label | Ref. |
|---|---|---|---|---|
| Various | March 3, 2015 | CD; digital download | Loveway Records | |
