= Indigo (Never Shout Never album) =

Studio album by Never Shout Never
- Released: November 13, 2012
- Recorded: 2010–12, US: Studio 2100 (Springfield)
- Genres: Psychedelic pop, indie rock, indie pop, rock
- Length: 36:05
- Label: Loveway Records
- Producers: Never Shout Never, Jeff Smith

Never Shout Never chronology
Time Travel (2011)	Indigo (2012)	Sunflower (2013)

Indigo is the fourth studio album by American rock band Never Shout Never. It was released on November 13, 2012, by Loveway Records. The album features the band recording as a whole for the second time; the first being in Time Travel. A bonus track was made available through some media outlets and also on the limited edition cassette tape. The album debuted at number 194 on the Billboard 200.

== Background ==
"I feel like without music I really don't have any purpose in this life. [Indigo] is kind of me rediscovering that drive to make music that makes people feel good."

— Christofer Ingle on the album.

== Recording ==
Christofer Ingle originally wanted to record every song with a different producer, all in different cities, to give each song a unique feel and its own style. The album would also include reworkings of "On The Brightside" and "Trouble."

For the recording of Indigo, Never Shout Never had recorded at Studio 2100 in Springfield, Missouri.

== Release and promotion ==
Never Shout Never announced on February 8, 2012, that their then-titled Good Times would be released sometime in the summer of 2012. Ingle announced on Twitter that the album would be out by late fall. Ingle demoed the new songs through Loveway Records' Stickam page on June 4, 2012.

=== Promotional singles ===
Prior to the start of The Indigo Tour, Never Shout Never released three free unreleased acoustic tracks from their album through Alternative Press.

=== Touring ===
To promote Indigo, Never Shout Never embarked on a South American tour to promote the album early. The tour began in early November 2012 and consisted of 6 shows. Ingle announced that he was getting the lineup together for the next tour, via Twitter on July 13, 2012. The Indigo Tour, the second tour to further promote the album, began in November 2012. The tour is composed of 22 show dates throughout North America. The tour was announced through the band's website on September 25, 2012.

== Critical reception ==
Professional ratings
Review scores
Source	Rating
Alter The Press!	4/5 stars
Alternative Press	3/5 stars
PropertyOfZack	3.5/5 stars

Indigo has received generally positive reviews. Claire Sheridan of Alter The Press! states that "Christofer Drew is a storyteller, capturing his audience right up until the last resounding word like an author that keeps their readers hanging on until the end." Alternative Press' Evan Lucy wrote that "[the band] could have used an outside set of eats to make things a little more dynamic, reign in the more head-scratching moments and correct some mixing issues. So in the end, Indigo is just a new entry into Drew's discography, another example of the shape-shifting singer's musical nomadism." Alyssa McKinley of PropertyOfZack comments that "Never Shout Never have taken many pop infused influences to put a new spin on their music, yet again. While at certain points, it simply doesn't work, standout tracks make Indigo an entirely worthwhile listen. Diverse in ingredients but consistent in flavor, this record is a step in a great direction for the band. But then again, who knows if direction is something that has ever mattered in the career of Never Shout Never."

== Track listing ==
No.	Title	Length
1.	"Magic"	3:04
2.	"All Mine"	3:17
3.	"Life Goes On"	3:06
4.	"Sorry"	3:33
5.	"Between Two Worlds"	2:58
6.	"Lust"	3:09
7.	"California Slang"	3:01
8.	"Wrong Side of Town"	3:44
9.	"Honey-Dew"	2:31
10.	"The Look"	2:49
11.	"Hazel Eyez"	4:53
Total length:		36:05

iTunes bonus tracks
No.	Title	Length
12.	"Sorry" (GONZO Remix)	3:21
Total length:		39:26

== Personnel ==
Never Shout Never

- Christofer Drew Ingle – lead vocals, guitars, ukulele, programming, banjo, harmonica, keyboard
- Taylor MacFee – bass, backing vocals
- Hayden Kaiser – guitar, backing vocals, percussion

Production

- David Beame – legal advisor
- David Conway – management
- Sha'an D'anthers – artwork
- Kevin Deems – photography
- Christofer Drew – artwork, composer, cover art, mixing
- Dirk Hemsath – management
- Patrick Maxwell – producer
- Never Shout Never – composer, primary artist, producer
- Jeff Smith – engineer, mastering, mixing, producer

== Charts ==
Chart performance for Indigo
Chart (2012)	Peak position
US Billboard 200	194

== Release history ==
Release dates and formats for Indigo
Region	Date	Label	Format(s)	Ref.
Various	November 13, 2012	Loveway Records	CD; digital download	
Various	December 15, 2012	Antique Records	Cassette tape	
