= Harmony (Never Shout Never album) =

Studio album by Never Shout Never
- Released: August 24, 2010
- Recorded: 2010
- Genre: Folk; folk pop; Acoustic
- Length: 25:09
- Label: Loveway Records; Sire; Warner Bros.
- Producer: Butch Vig

Never Shout Never chronology
What Is Love? (2010)	Harmony (2010)	Never Shout Never & The Maine (2010)

Singles from Harmony
- 1. "CheaterCheaterBestFriendEater" Released: July 28, 2010; 2. "This Shit Never Getz Old" Released: August 10, 2010; 3. "Lovesick" Released: August 29, 2010

Harmony is the second studio album by Never Shout Never and was released on August 24, 2010. The album was streamed on his MySpace on August 22, 2010. Harmony debuted at number 14 on the Billboard 200 albums chart and sold 23,000 copies in its first week.

== Background and release ==
On July 27, 2010, Never Shout Never released the Melody EP, as well as announcing that their second studio album would be released on August 24, 2010. The album was produced by Butch Vig and was recorded in El Dorado, Burbank, California. According to Christofer Drew, the album was made in two weeks.

On July 11, 2010, Never Shout Never released the track list for Harmony. Two days later, the cover art was revealed. "CheaterCheaterBestFriendEater" was released as the album's first single via MySpace on July 28. A music video for the song was later released onto YouTube on August 2. On August 10, "This Shit Never Getz Old" was released for streaming on the band's website. A music video for the song, "I Love You More Than You Will Ever Know" was released on August 13. He premiered a music video for "This Shit Getz Old" the following day. Never Shout Never premiered a music video for the track, "Lousy Truth" on August 26. On August 29, Never Shout Never released two music videos for the songs "Piggy Bank" and "Lovesick", with the latter being released as the album's third single. They also released a music video for "First Dance" that same day. A music video for "Sellout" premiered via YouTube on September 14. The music video for "Trampoline" was released on September 27. On October 13, a music video for "Harmony" was released.

The packaging of the CD comes with flower seeds (while the limited edition bundle also includes a flower pot with the album name on it) with planting instructions "so you can get involved and make the world a more beautiful place!."

== Composition ==
"I think we've only seen the tip of the iceberg in terms of what he can do. It's gonna be interesting to see where he takes this," producer Butch Vig said, upon working on the album with Drew. Musically, Drew described the album as "blues-driven," having written 20 tracks. He also stated that Harmony was like the "last Never Shout Never record [...] I wanna give 'em youthful happy songs. It's a summer journey. And I'm in harmony with the situation I'm in. It was an easier record to make."

== Melody ==
Melody is a digital release described by record label Sire as a "Deluxe Digital Collection". It contains the song from Harmony, "cheatercheaterbestfriendeater" as well as an exclusive track titled, "Coffee and Cigarettes" along with a music video for the song. It was released on July 27, 2010.

== Promotion ==
Upon the release of Harmony, Never Shout Never embarked on the VMA Tour with the Ready Set in August 2010. He also performed a secret show with the Ready Set in Lawrence, Kansas, on August 31. In the fall of 2010, Never Shout Never co-headlined the Harmony Tour with The Maine, where the bands had fans gather canned food to help those in need. As a gift to the fans, they released a live split EP which was made available for free download on Never Shout Never's website.

== Critical reception ==
Professional ratings
Review scores
Source	Rating
AllMusic	2/5 stars
Alternative Press	3.5/5 stars

Harmony was received with mixed to negative reviews. Gregory Heaney from AllMusic, although applauding the production of the album, criticized the album's lyrics, saying that "while the production has grown up, Drew still seems to be in the same place as a songwriter. [...] Though Drew has proven that he has a good ear for melody, his over-sweetened lyrics rob the songs of any real emotional weight." Scott Heisel from Alternative Press, however, was more positive, stating that "the most hated man in emo [...] sounds even stronger than he did on [What is Love?, his debut album], turning in consistently better vocal performances that demonstrate a slight hint of [...] maturity while handling lyrical topics both serious [...] and not-so-much."

In an interview with Propertyofzack.com, when asked if he was happy with the album's reception, Drew responded, "Sort of. It was a fun record to make, but we only had two weeks to make it. It was a very fun record. Butch was a great guy to work with. Harmony was okay; it's not my favorite album ever. I don't listen to it. I would never listen to it."

== Track listing ==
All tracks are written by Christofer Drew Ingle.

No.	Title	Length
1.	"Harmony"	2:50
2.	"This Shit Getz Old"	2:31
3.	"CheaterCheaterBestFriendEater"	2:58
4.	"Lovesick"	2:36
5.	"Piggy Bank"	1:34
6.	"I Love You More Than You Will Ever Know"	2:33
7.	"First Dance"	2:09
8.	"Lousy Truth"	2:26
9.	"Trampoline"	2:24
10.	"Sweet Perfection"	2:18
11.	"Sellout"	2:48
Total length:		25:09

Special edition
No.	Title	Length
12.	"Damn Dog" (Live)	3:43
13.	"Love Is Our Weapon" (Live)	2:28
14.	"If You Go Leave Your Key in the Mailbox"	2:35
Total length:		33:55

iTunes edition
No.	Title	Length
12.	"If You Go Leave Your Key in the Mailbox"	2:35
13.	"CheaterCheaterBestFriendEater" (Music video)	2:59
14.	"CheaterCheaterBestFriendEater" (Lyric video)	3:00
Total length:		33:43

== Personnel ==
Credits for Harmony adapted from AllMusic.

Never Shout Never

- Christofer Drew Ingle – lead vocals, guitars, bass, ukulele, violin, drums, percussion, tambourine, cabasa, djembe, glockenspiel, xylophone, marimba, sleigh bells, piano, keyboards, synthesizers, programming, banjo, harmonica, composer, lyrics
- Caleb Denison – additional guitars

Production

- Produced by Butch Vig
- Engineered by Billy Bush
- Mastered by Dan Hersch
- Mixed by Jon Kaplan
- Designs and illustrations by Frank Maddocks
- Additional engineering by Chris Steffen
- Photography by Colby Moore and Christofer Drew Ingle
- Production coordination by Shari Sutcliffe
- A&R by Craig Aaronson and Perry Watts-Russell

== Charts ==
Chart performance for Harmony
Chart (2010)	Peak position
US Billboard 200	14
