= Big City Dreams =

Single by Never Shout Never

from the EP The Yippee
- Released: July 18, 2008
- Genre: Folk-pop; neon pop
- Length: 3:13
- Label: Loveway Records
- Songwriter(s): Christofer Drew
- Producer(s): Drew

Never Shout Never singles chronology
"Big City Dreams" (2008)	"Trouble" (2008)

Music video
- "Big City Dreams" on YouTube

"Big City Dreams" (stylised as "Bigcitydreams") is a song by American indie rock band, Never Shout Never. The song was released on July 18, 2008, as the debut and lead single from their second EP, The Yippee EP. It peaked at number one on the Billboard US Hot Singles Sales chart.

== Background and composition ==
"Big City Dreams" was written and produced by Christofer Drew. The track runs at 68 BPM and is in the key of C major. The song has been described as a folk-pop song by MTV. It has also been described as Never Shout Never's "big break" into the music industry. Drew performed the song live on MTV TRL on July 30, 2008.

== Critical reception ==
James Shotwell of Under the Gun Review gave a positive review for the track stating, "A beautiful piano line mixed with tambourine and guitar sinks under your skin while he vocals take you away to a warm summer day in a field with the one you love. The song is gorgeous, simple, and sure to become the song many teens share with their 'secret' crushes." Andy Gesner of Hip Video Promo noted, "its just the sort of bracing and emotionally-forthright pop that connects with young listeners. Its narrative, too, is an easy one to identify with."

== Music video ==
The music video for "Big City Dreams" was released in December 2008 and was directed by Isaac Ravishankara. The video was shot in Red Hook, Brooklyn. The video features actress Laura Gilreath as Drew's love interest. The music video begins with Drew in his living room sitting with his girlfriend before she leaves the Midwest. As she walks through the streets of the town she's abandoning, a ball of yellow yarn attached to her ankle begins to unravel. Drew grabs hold of the loose end and walks the same roads as she does, spooling it up in his arms. Finally, he catches up to her in an industrial section of town as she has already taken to the air. Resigned to his fate, the singer lets go of the kite string and watches her sail away.

== Charts ==
Chart performance for "Big City Dreams"
Chart (2009)	Peak position
US Hot Singles Sales (Billboard)	1
