= Christofer Drew =

American musician

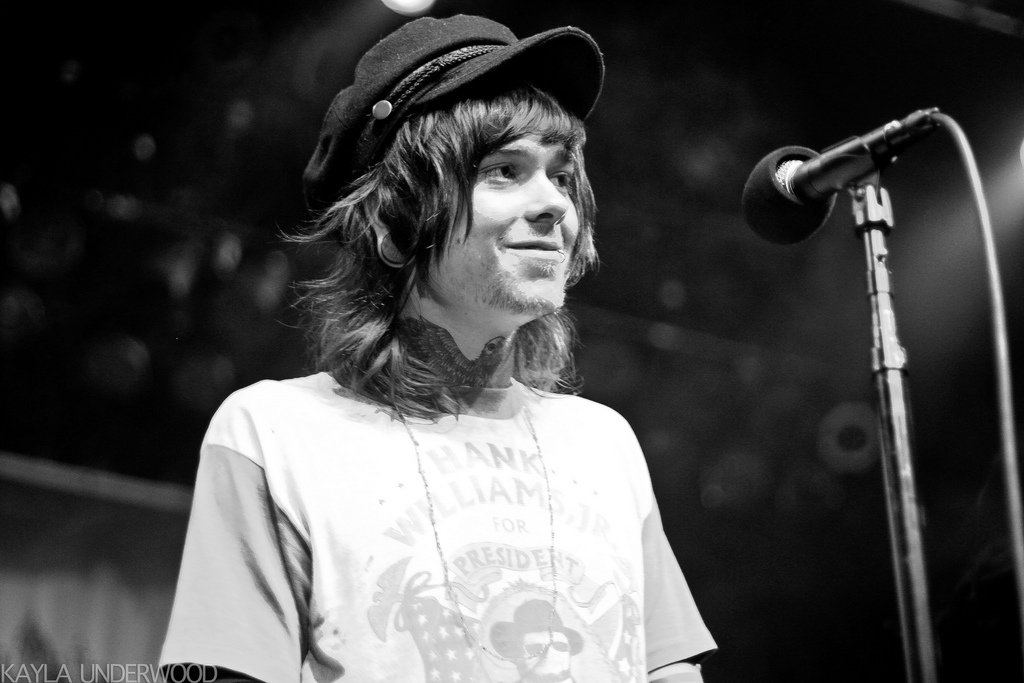
- Drew during the Time Travel Tour in 2011

Background information
- Born: Christopher Drew Ingle; Oceanside, California, U.S.
- Genres: Indie rock; experimental metal
- Occupations: Musician; painter
- Instruments: Vocals; guitar; keyboards; bass; drums; percussion; ukulele; violin; banjo; harmonica
- Years active: 2007–present
- Labels: Sire; Loveway
- Formerly of: Never Shout Never; Eat Me Raw; Gonzo

Christofer Drew Ingle is an American painter and former musician best known for his time as the frontman and guitarist of the indie rock band Never Shout Never and the experimental metal band Eat Me Raw.

== Early life ==
Drew was born in Oceanside, California, to Nancy Keifner and Edward Ingle. He has three siblings: David, Sarah and Hannah. He is of English, Irish, and German descent. He was raised in Joplin, Missouri.

== Music career ==
=== Never Shout Never (2007–2023, 2025) ===
Originally a solo project, Drew began making music under the alias NeverShoutNever! in 2007 (age 16). His first exposure came through the internet, where he achieved success on MySpace before issuing the extended play, The Yippee EP on July 29, 2008. On July 30, 2008, he was featured on TRL, where he performed his single "Bigcitydreams". He toured with Hellogoodbye and Ace Enders in the fall of 2008. The spelling was later changed to 'Never Shout Never', and went on to form into a full band instead of a solo project exclusive to Drew. On January 26, 2010, Never Shout Never released their debut studio album, What Is Love?. The second studio album, Harmony on August 24, 2010, peaking at number 14 on the Billboard 200 and sold 23,000 copies first week. Time Travel was released as the third studio album on September 20, 2011. On November 13, 2012, Indigo was released as the fourth studio album. The fifth studio album, Sunflower was released on July 2, 2013. On March 3, 2015, the sixth studio album, Recycled Youth was released. Black Cat was released on August 7, 2015. Drew revealed in December 2018 that after a small tour in Mexico and Brasil the following month, Never Shout Never would disband. However, he reached out to fans via an Instagram post two days later asking if he should keep making music under the name. Following the final show in Brazil he stated he was uncertain of the band's future. Drew went on to release Unborn Spark, an acoustic LP, on June 12, 2020, after a 5-year break from releasing new music. On November 25, 2023, Drew announced via Twitter his retirement from music to pursue a new career in professional painting. He also released the final mixes of his intended album, Advent of Violet Soul on the same day. He has retired from the music industry multiple times throughout his life. However, on October 29, 2024, Never Shout Never was announced to perform at When We Were Young in October 2025.

=== Eatmewhileimhot! (2008–2019) ===
In 2008, Drew and fellow band members of Never Shout Never, Taylor McFee, Hayden Kaiser, and former member Caleb Denison, created an experimental band by the name "Eatmewhileimhot!", originally making music with post-hardcore influences, and on later releases experimenting by expanding their sound into metalcore, deathcore, and experimental metal. Their debut studio album, xALBUMx was released on July 27, 2010, and peaked at number 46 on the US Heatseekers Album chart. Their second studio album, Mushroom was released on March 2, 2012.

=== Other projects (2011−2022) ===
In 2011, Drew released his debut solo EP called The Modern Racket. He released a free solo EP in 2012 titled, The Light. He started a side project called Gonzo in 2012 and released three EPs, Beet Pharm, Da Funq and Esoteric. In 2020, Drew started a new psychedelic project called Dryymy.

In 2022, Drew revealed on Twitter that he would begin a new screamo project named "Shogun" and that he would be working on an EP for the project. On March 8, 2022, Drew announced on Twitter that he would be retiring from music and decided to not release "Shogun." However, he announced a new single for Shogun in August 2022. Drew also started an EDM project called Shen Chow. On November 25, 2023, Drew announced via Twitter his second retirement from music.

== Personal life ==
At the age of 16, Christofer became a vegetarian. Drew is also Christian. In 2019, Drew fathered a son.

In 2012, Drew was arrested for marijuana possession and was charged with two felonies. In 2019, Drew's brother David was shot to death by police while suffering a mental health crisis.

== Discography ==
Never Shout Never

- What Is Love? (Sire, 2010)
- Harmony (Sire, 2010)
- Time Travel (Sire, 2011)
- Indigo (Sire, 2012)
- Sunflower (Sire, 2013)
- Recycled Youth Vol. 1 (Sire, 2015)
- Black Cat (Sire, 2015)
- Unborn Spark (Kymica, 2020)

Solo

- The Modern Racket (EP) (Loveway, 2011)
- The Light (EP) (Loveway, 2012)

Eatmewhileimhot!

- xALBUMx (Loveway, 2010)
- Mushroom (Loveway, 2012)

The Gonzo

- Beet Pharm (Loveway, 2012)
- DaFunQ (Loveway, 2013)

Shen Chow

- This Is (EP) (2022)
