= Boys Like Girls discography =

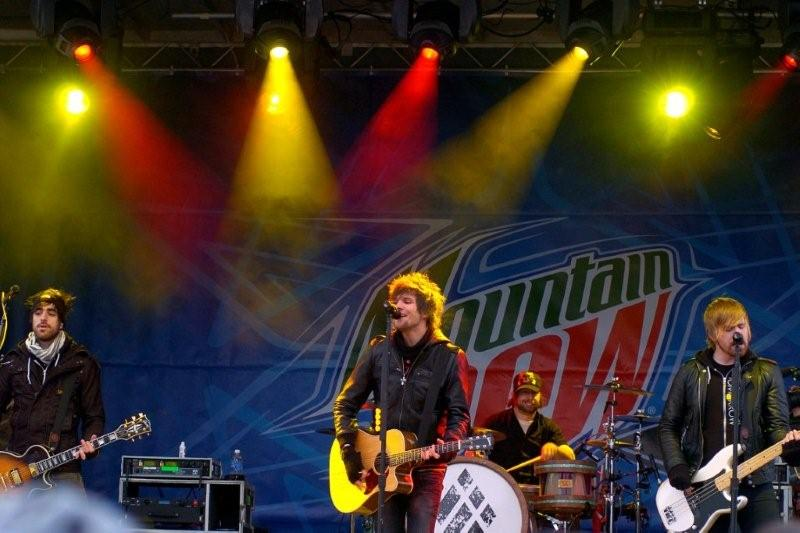
- Boys Like Girls in 2009
- Studio albums: 4
- Extended plays: 2
- Live albums: 1
- Singles: 15
- Music videos: 15

American pop rock group Boys Like Girls has released four studio albums, one live album, two extended plays, and fifteen singles.

After forming in 2005, the band signed with Columbia Records the following year and released their debut single, "Hero/Heroine", which initially failed to chart. The song was included on their self-titled debut album, which was released in August 2006. Following the top 40 success of its second single, "The Great Escape", the group re-released "Hero/Heroine" and the album reached a new peak position of 55 on the Billboard 200. Boys Like Girls was eventually certified Gold by the Recording Industry Association of America (RIAA) in 2008. A third single, "Thunder", was released in 2008 to moderate chart success. All three singles were also certified Gold by RIAA, with "The Great Escape" later going Platinum.

Their second album, Love Drunk, was released on September 8, 2009. Fuelled by the success of its title track and lead single, the album debuted at #8 on the Billboard 200 and at #1 on the Billboard Top Rock Albums chart. The group earned its highest-charting single to date with "Two Is Better Than One", a collaboration with American country pop artist Taylor Swift that served as the record's second single. Both singles received Platinum certifications from RIAA. The group also experience success in Canada with Love Drunk, as the album charted at number 11 on the Canadian Albums Chart and its first two singles reached the top 40 on the Canadian Hot 100. "Heart Heart Heartbreak" was released in 2010 as the album's third single and became the group's first release to miss the Hot 100.

In 2012, the group released their third studio album, Crazy World. The album was a commercial disappointment for the band, reaching number 134 on the Billboard 200 and producing only one single, "Be Your Everything". The group returned with their four studio album, Sunday at Foxwoods, released on October 20, 2023.

As of 2012, Boys Like Girls has sold over one million albums and eight million singles worldwide.

== Studio albums ==
List of albums, with selected chart positions, sales figures and certifications
| Title | Album details | Peak chart positions | | | | | | | | Sales | Certifications (sales threshold) |
| Title | Album details | US | US Alt. | US Rock | US Heat | AUS | CAN | JPN | UK | Sales | Certifications (sales threshold) |
|---|---|---|---|---|---|---|---|---|---|---|---|
| Boys Like Girls | Released: August 22, 2006; Label: Columbia/Red Ink; Formats: CD, digital download | 55 | 12 | 14 | 2 | — | — (Note: Boys Like Girls did not enter the Canadian Albums Chart, but peaked at number 42 on the Canadian Alternative Albums chart.) | — | — | US: 700,000 | RIAA: Gold |
| Love Drunk | Released: September 8, 2009; Label: Columbia/Red Ink; Formats: CD, digital download | 8 | 1 | 1 | — | 95 | 11 | 45 | 162 | US: 230,000 | |
| Crazy World | Released: December 11, 2012; Label: Columbia; Formats: CD, digital download | 134 | — | — | — | — | — | — | — | | |
| Sunday at Foxwoods | Released: October 20, 2023; Label: Fearless; Formats: CD, digital download | — | — | — | — | — | — | — | — | | |
"—" denotes a recording that did not chart or was not released in that territory.

== Live albums ==
List of live albums
| Title | Live album details |
|---|---|
| The Homecoming | Released: September 8, 2025; Label: Fearless; Formats: Digital download, streaming |

== Extended plays ==
List of extended plays
| Title | EP details |
|---|---|
| AOL Music Sessions | Released: September 11, 2007; Label: Sony BMG; Formats: Digital download, streaming |
| Crazy World EP | Released: July 17, 2012; Label: Columbia; Formats: Digital download, streaming |

== Singles ==
List of singles, with selected chart positions and certifications, showing year released and album name
| Title | Year | Peak chart positions | | | | | | | | | | Certifications (sales threshold) | Album |
| Title | Year | US | US Pop | AUS | CAN | CZE | JPN | KOR | NZ | SGP | UK | Certifications (sales threshold) | Album |
|---|---|---|---|---|---|---|---|---|---|---|---|---|---|
| "Hero/Heroine" | 2007 | 43 | 22 | — | — | — | — | — | — | 3 | — | RIAA: Gold | Boys Like Girls |
| "The Great Escape" | 2007 | 23 | 8 | — | 57 | — | — | 76 | 36 | 1 | 72 | RIAA: Platinum; BPI: Silver; RMNZ: Gold | Boys Like Girls |
| "Thunder" | 2008 | 76 | 21 | — | — | — | — | — | — | 6 | — | RIAA: Gold | Boys Like Girls |
| "Love Drunk" | 2009 | 22 | 8 | 51 | 32 | — | 74 | — | 24 | 4 | 44 | RIAA: Platinum; BPI: Silver; MC: Gold; RMNZ: Gold | Love Drunk |
| "Two Is Better Than One" (featuring Taylor Swift) | 2009 | 18 | 7 | — | 18 | — | — | 183 | — | 3 | — | RIAA: Platinum; MC: Gold | Love Drunk |
| "Heart Heart Heartbreak" | 2010 | — | 31 | — | — | — | — | — | — | — | — | | Love Drunk |
| "Be Your Everything" | 2012 | — (Note: "Be Your Everything" did not enter the Billboard Hot 100, but peaked at number 18 on the Hot Singles Sales chart.) | — | — | — | — | — | — | — | 8 | — | | Crazy World |
| "Life of the Party" | 2012 | — | — | — | — | — | — | 74 | — | — | — | | Crazy World |
| "Blood and Sugar" | 2023 | — | — | — | — | — | — | — | — | — | — | | Sunday at Foxwoods |
| "Language" | 2023 | — | — | — | — | — | — | — | — | — | — | | Sunday at Foxwoods |
| "The Outside" | 2023 | — | — | — | — | 24 | — | — | — | — | — | | Sunday at Foxwoods |
| "Cry" | 2023 | — | — | — | — | — | — | — | — | — | — | | Sunday at Foxwoods |
| "New Love" | 2023 | — | — | — | — | — | — | — | — | — | — | | Sunday at Foxwoods |
| "Hold My Breath" (with Said the Sky) | 2024 | — | — | — | — | — | — | — | — | — | — | | TBA |
| "Watch the Fire" (with Dashboard Confessional) | 2024 | — | — | — | — | — | — | — | — | — | — | | TBA |
"—" denotes a recording that did not chart or was not released in that territory.

=== Promotional singles ===
List of promotional singles, showing year released and album name
| Title | Year | Album |
|---|---|---|
| "She's Got a Boyfriend Now" | 2009 | Love Drunk |
| "Stuck in the Middle" | 2012 | Crazy World |
| "Leaving California" | 2012 | Crazy World |
| "Hey You" | 2012 | Crazy World |

== Videography ==
=== Video releases ===
| Title | Album details | Peak chart positions |
| Title | Album details | US Video |
|---|---|---|
| Read Between the Lines | Release date: November 8, 2008; Label: Columbia/Red Ink | 20 |

=== Music videos ===
List of music videos, showing year released and director
| Title | Year | Director(s) |
|---|---|---|
| "Hero/Heroine" (Version 1) | 2006 | Chris Vaglio/Mark Serao |
| "Hero/Heroine" (Version 2) | 2007 | Chris Applebaum |
| "The Great Escape" | 2007 | Alan Ferguson |
| "Thunder" | 2008 | Josh Forbes |
| "Heels Over Head" (live) | 2008 | Doug Spangenberg |
| "Love Drunk" | 2009 | Travis Kopach |
| "Two Is Better Than One" | 2009 | Meiert Avis |
| "Heart Heart Heartbreak" | 2010 | Doug Spangenberg |
| "Be Your Everything" | 2012 | David McClister |
| "Blood & Sugar" | 2023 | Matty Vogel |
| "Cry" | 2023 | |
| "New Love" | 2023 | |
| "Miracle" | 2023 | P. Tracy |
| "You'll Be In My Heart" | 2024 | Brian Doherty |
| "Watch the Fire" | 2024 | Brian Doherty |
