= Pressure (Youngblood Hawke song) =

Single by Youngblood Hawke
- Released: January 7, 2014 (Radio); March 11, 2014 (Digital)
- Recorded: 2013
- Genre: Indie rock, funk pop, alternative dance
- Length: 3:34
- Label: Republic
- Songwriter(s): Simon Katz, Sam Martin, Matt Squire

Youngblood Hawke singles chronology
"Stars (Hold On)" (2013)	"Pressure" (2014)	""Wolves"" (2014)

"Pressure" is a song by American indie pop band Youngblood Hawke.

== Critical reception ==
Professional ratings
Review scores
Source	Rating
Mind Equals Blown	7.5/10 stars

"Pressure" has been met with positive critical reviews. Mind Equals Blown gave the song a 7.5/10 rating, calling the song "a funky, energetic, modern indie song," also comparing the song to Neon Trees and Grouplove. Ear Buddy stated that the song was just as good as the band's debut album, Wake Up. Fender says that the song "stays true to the...band’s happy-go-lucky indie pop, but it also boasts a slinky, club-ready feel to it." Surviving the Golden Age said the song "continues the band’s mastery of harmonies, vivid imagery and an [sic] uplifting hooks."
