= Love Drunk (disambiguation) =

Love Drunk is a 2009 album by Boys Like Girls.

Love Drunk may also refer to:

- "Love Drunk" (Boys Like Girls song), 2009 song by Boys Like Girls
- "Love Drunk" (Loick Essien song), 2010 song by Loick Essien
- Love sickness
- Love addiction
- "Love Drunk", a song by Little Mix from DNA
- "Love Drunk", a song by Charlotte Church from Back to Scratch

== See also ==
- Drunk Love, 2006 EP by The Cab
- "Drunk on Love"
- Punch-Drunk Love, 2002 film
