= Heart Heart Heartbreak =

Single by Boys Like Girls

from the album Love Drunk
- Released: April 13, 2010
- Recorded: 2008–2009
- Genre: Pop punk; power pop; pop rock; neon pop; pop
- Length: 3:24
- Label: Columbia/Red Ink
- Songwriters: Martin Johnson; Sam Hollander; Dave Katz
- Producers: Brian Howes; S*A*M and Sluggo

Boys Like Girls singles chronology
"Two Is Better Than One" (2009)	"Heart Heart Heartbreak" (2010)	"Be Your Everything" (2012)

Music video
- "Heart Heart Heartbreak" on YouTube

"Heart Heart Heartbreak" is a song by American rock band Boys Like Girls. The song is the third single released from Boys Like Girls' second studio album, Love Drunk, and was released on April 13, 2010. It was written by lead singer Martin Johnson, along with Sam Hollander and Dave Katz of the production team S*A*M and Sluggo.

== Release ==
The song was first posted on their PureVolume page on August 18, 2009. They premiered the song on television on March 22, 2010, performing on Lopez Tonight. The song was serviced to contemporary hit radio in the United States on April 13, as the Love Drunk's third and final single. The group also performed the track at the Miss USA 2010 in May.

== Composition ==
"Heart Heart Heartbreak" was written by Martin Johnson, Sam Hollander and Dave Katz, while production was handled by Brian Howes and S*A*M and Sluggo. The song features more auto-tuned vocals from Johnson and its guitar melody has been compared to Bon Jovi's "It's My Life" for sounding similar.

== Reception ==
Gregory Robson of AbsolutePunk.net criticized the track for being "less original" as he felt that the song "sounds eerily reminiscent of Slippery When Wet-era Bon Jovi." PunkNews.org stated, "it becomes blatantly obvious the band has gone all Hellogoodbye with their sound, as horrible synthetic vocals with distorting reverb and electro-something-or-other effects blare out." A positive review came from Ariana Leo of Alternative Press who praised guitarist Paul DiGiovanni's work as some of his best "in their entire discography."

== Chart performance ==
The song debuted at number 36 on the US Billboard Pop Airplay chart for the week ending May 8, 2010. After seven weeks on the chart, it peaked at number 31 in June 2010, the group's first single to miss the top 30 on that chart.

== Music video ==
A music video was also made and released, which premiered on Vevo on June 4, 2010. The video was directed by Doug Spangenberg, who had previously directed their video for "Heels Over Head" which was a live video from their Read Between the Lines album. The music video takes place at a beauty pageant ("Brockton Beauties") where the girls are sabotaging each other to win.

According to bassist Bryan Donahue, a different music video was made, prior to their tour In Canada. However, upon seeing a rough version of the it and not turning out the way they envisioned it, they decided to scrap it and start again from scratch.

== Personnel ==
Credits for "Heart Heart Heartbreak" adapted from album's liner notes.

Boys Like Girls

- Martin Johnson – lead vocals, guitar, background vocals
- John Keefe – drums
- Bryan Donahue – bass
- Paul DiGiovanni – guitar

Additional musicians

- Brian Howes – backing vocals, guitar, keyboards
- Jay "JVP" Van Poederooyen – keyboards, percussion
- The Vancouver Mafia – backing vocals

Production

- Brian Howes – producer
- S*A*M and Sluggo – producer
- Martin Johnson – co-producer
- Sean Gould – recording engineer
- Jay "JVP" Van Poederooyen – engineer
- Mike Caffrey – engineer
- Grant Michaels – assistant engineer
- Misha Rajaratnam – editing
- Tom Lord-Alge – mixing
- Vlado Meller – mastering

== Charts ==
Chart performance for "Heart Heart Heartbreak"
Chart (2010)	Peak position
US Pop Airplay (Billboard)	31

== Release history ==
Release dates for "Heart Heart Heartbreak"
Region	Date	Format	Label	Ref.
Various	August 19, 2009	Streaming	Columbia	
United States	April 13, 2010	Contemporary hit radio	Columbia	
