= PYHU =

- "Put Your Hands Up (If You Feel Love)", the fourth single from the 2010 album Aphrodite by Kylie Minogue
- "Put Your Hearts Up", the 2011 debut single by American actress-singer Ariana Grande
