= Boys Like Girls (album) =

Studio album by Boys Like Girls
- Released: August 22, 2006
- Recorded: Early 2006
- Genre: Pop rock; pop-punk; emo pop; alternative rock
- Length: 45:14
- Label: Columbia; Red Ink
- Producer: Matt Squire

Boys Like Girls chronology
Boys Like Girls (2006)	Love Drunk (2009)

Singles from Boys Like Girls
- 1. "Hero/Heroine" Released: October 16, 2006; 2. "The Great Escape" Released: March 3, 2007; 3. "Thunder" Released: May 6, 2008

Boys Like Girls is the debut studio album by American rock band Boys Like Girls. It was released on August 22, 2006, by Columbia Records and Red Ink. The album received mixed reviews from critics. Boys Like Girls reached number 55 on the Billboard 200 and spawned three singles: "Hero/Heroine", "The Great Escape" and "Thunder". To promote the record, the band toured across North America and the UK as support for various pop-punk acts, with appearances at music festivals and amusement parks.

== Background ==
Boys Like Girls formed in late 2005 when vocalist/guitarist Martin Johnson, previously of the band IDK, wrote a few songs that he wished to record. He subsequently brought in bassist Bryan Donahue and drummer John Keefe, both of whom Johnson had played with in local acts Lancaster and The Bends. Keefe, in turn, recruited guitarist Paul DiGiovanni. They posted a handful of demos online, and by the end of the year, were attracting a following and noticed by booking agent Matt Galle and producer Matt Squire, both of whom wanted to work with the band. In February and March 2006, the band supported A Thorn for Every Heart on their US tour. Following its conclusion, the band went to record their debut album with Squire. He acted as the producer, engineer; he mixed every track except "The Great Escape" and "On Top of the World", which were mixed by Tom Lord-Alge with assistance from Femio Hernandez at South Beach Studios. George Marino mastered the album at Sterling Sound in New York.

== Music and lyrics ==
The album explores lyrical themes such as romance. According to a lyric feature written by the album's principal songwriter, Martin Johnson, the lyrical content of the songs is semi-autobiographical.

Our self-titled debut goes through a series of events throughout the tracklisting, representing the last two years of my life. Though the songs weren't composed with that in mind, once they were all recorded it became apparent that there was a story of love, loss, youth, and angst for the future that was waiting to be told. The songs go from optimistic songs and love songs to loss and breakup songs, ending back with "Holiday", which starts the sequence over and symbolizes moving on and cycles in everyone's life.

While, as the title might suggest, songs about boys liking girls clearly prevail on the album, Johnson occasionally touched upon themes such as his mother's battle with cancer, leaving home, and promiscuous adolescents. Concerning the latter, he discussed the motivation behind the song "Dance Hall Drug":

So many kids are growing up too fast. 13-year olds are giving each other hand jobs in the back of the bus, 14-year olds are already drinking and partying, and kids spend more time worried about growing up and being cool than they do actually growing up and being a kid.

The song "On Top of the World" is about Johnson's late mother.

== Release ==
On July 24, 2006, Boys Like Girls was announced for release in the following month. It was released on August 22 through Red Ink and Columbia Records. The album's lead single was "Hero/Heroine", which was followed by "The Great Escape", and the re-release of Hero/Heroine and then "Thunder". In October, the band went on tour with Lostprophets. Following this, the band went on tour with Spitalfield, Punchline, Valencia and Over It in November and December.

In February and March 2007, the group supported Cartel on their tour of the US. On March 13, "The Great Escape" was released to mainstream radio. Following this, they appeared at The Bamboozle festival. From early April to early June, the band supported Hellogoodbye on their Two Months Of Spring Break Tour '99 tour of North America. From late June to late August, the band went on the 2007 edition of Warped Tour. Starting in late September, the group headlined the Tourzilla tour. The first part ran from late September to late October and featured All Time Low, the Audition and We the Kings, while the second part ran from late October and continued into November with All Time Low, the Audition and Valencia. During this tour, a deluxe edition of Boys Like Girls was released. The CD came with enhanced content, which included a photo gallery, videos of the group's AOL Sessions performance, as well as live footage of "Heels Over Head" and "The Great Escape". The CD features new mixes of "Hero/Heroine" and "Heels Over Head", done by Tom Lord-Alge, and an acoustic version of "Hero/Heroine" as bonus tracks. On October 16, "Hero/Heroine" was released to mainstream radio.

From early March to early May 2008, the band supported Avril Lavigne on her The Best Damn World Tour in the US. "Thunder" was released to top 40 radio stations on May 6. In July and August, the group went on a co-headlining US tour with Good Charlotte, with support from Metro Station and the Maine, dubbed the Soundtrack of Your Summer tour. In between dates on this tour, the band performed at various Six Flags locations as part of the mtvU Video Music Awards Tour. In September and October, the band went on the Verizon College tour with Cute Is What We Aim For and Lights. In January 2009, the band went on a tour of the UK with Metro Station. In 2016, the band went on tour for the tenth anniversary of the album and played the record in its entirety.

== Reception ==
Professional ratings
Review scores
Source	Rating
AbsolutePunk	(65%)
AllMusic	2.5/5 stars
IGN	6.8/10
Melodic	3.5/5 stars

Corey Apar from AllMusic commended the band's musical abilities under the emo pop-rock subgenre but felt they lacked a unique quirk to separate them from similar acts that have "the overwhelming catchiness of the All-American Rejects or the unbridled enthusiasm of the City Drive." He concluded that: "Regardless, those looking for a quick fix will surely eat up the likes of Boys Like Girls." IGN's Chad Grischow highlighted the band's penchant for "solid vocals and pop sensibilities ("The Great Escape, "Heels Over Head")" and gave note of their credentials in the emo genre ("Broken Man", "Dance Hall Drug"), but found the rest of the album sounding too similar to Jimmy Eat World and the Postal Service, along with an overabundance of sappy lyrics sung with auto-effected vocals, concluding that: "Boys Like Girls are not a groundbreaking band by any means, but despite the occasionally heavy-handed borrowings and lazy lyrics, there are enough glimpses of promise within their debut to make it worth checking out."

Cleveland.com ranked "The Great Escape" at number 69 on their list of the top 100 pop-punk songs. Alternative Press ranked "The Great Escape" at number 97 on their list of the best 100 singles from the 2000s.

== Commercial performance ==
While the online community and critics crowned Boys Like Girls "2006's Panic! at the Disco or Fall Out Boy", album sales were less convincing. Despite promotional front page features (such as Spin's "Artist of the Day" or Absolutepunk.net's "Featured Band" and "Absolute Exclusive: Album Leak"), Boys Like Girls scanned a mere 1,472 units within its first week of sales, thus failing to chart the Billboard 200. However, continuous touring and promoting helped the record gain a No. 179 entry into the chart in April 2007. It continued to gain popularity as the single, "The Great Escape", climbed the charts and eventually peaked at No. 55 in August 2007. The album has been certified Gold by the RIAA for over 500,000 units shipped. By May 2008, the album had sold 532,000 copies. As of June 2009, the album sold 700,000 in the United States.

== Track listing ==
All songs written by Martin Johnson, except where noted.

Standard Edition
No.	Title	Writer(s)	Length
1.	"The Great Escape"	Martin Johnson; Sam Hollander; Dave Katz	3:28
2.	"Five Minutes to Midnight"	Johnson; Hollander; Katz	3:47
3.	"Hero/Heroine"		3:52
4.	"On Top of the World"		3:36
5.	"Thunder"		3:56
6.	"Me, You and My Medication"		4:28
7.	"Up Against the Wall"	Johnson; Hollander; Katz	3:39
8.	"Dance Hall Drug"		3:29
9.	"Learning to Fall"	Johnson; Hollander; Katz	3:04
10.	"Heels Over Head"		3:08
11.	"Broken Man"		3:31
12.	"Holiday"		5:08
Total length:			45:14

Bonus Tracks
No.	Title	Length
1.	"Hero/Heroine (Acoustic Version)"	3:55
2.	"Hero/Heroine (Tom Lord-Alge Mix)"	3:46

== Personnel ==
Adapted credits from the liner notes of Boys Like Girls.

Boys Like Girls

- Martin Johnson – lead vocals, rhythm guitar
- John Keefe – drums
- Bryan Donahue – bass
- Paul DiGiovanni – lead guitar

Production and design

- Matt Squire – producer, engineer, mixing (all except tracks 1 and 4)
- Tom Lord-Alge – mixing (tracks 1 and 4)
- Femio Hernandez – assistant
- George Marino – mastering
- Shane McCauley – photography
- Matt Govaere – art direction, graphic design

== Charts ==
=== Weekly charts ===
Weekly chart performance for Boys Like Girls
Chart (2006–2008)	Peak position
Canadian Alternative Albums (Nielsen)	42
US Billboard 200	55
US Heatseekers Albums (Billboard)	2
US Top Alternative Albums (Billboard)	12
US Top Rock Albums (Billboard)	14

=== Year-end charts ===
Year-end chart performance for Boys Like Girls
Chart (2008)	Peak position
US Billboard 200	164

== Certifications ==
Certifications for Boys Like Girls
Region	Certification	Certified units/sales
United States (RIAA)	Gold	500,000^{^}
^{^} Shipments figures based on certification alone.
