= Crazy World (Boys Like Girls album) =

Studio album by Boys Like Girls
- Released: December 11, 2012
- Recorded: December 2011 – May 2012
- Studios: Cash Cash Studios, New Jersey; Killingsworth Studios, Studio City, CA; Kung Fu Gardens, Hollywood, CA; Littlebox Studio, Glendale, CA; Red Bull Studios, Santa Monica, CA; The Lodge, Studio City, CA; The Village, Santa Monica, CA; Westlake Studios, Los Angeles, CA
- Genres: Pop rock; country pop
- Length: 42:26
- Label: Columbia
- Producer: Martin Johnson

Boys Like Girls chronology
Love Drunk (2009)	Crazy World (2012)	Sunday at Foxwoods (2023)

Singles from Crazy World
- 1. "Be Your Everything" Released: August 14, 2012; 2. "Life of the Party" Released: November 4, 2012

Crazy World is the third studio album by American rock band Boys Like Girls. It marks a departure from the group's original emo and alternative rock sound in favor of a more country style. The Crazy World EP was released on July 17, 2012, with the tracks, "Be Your Everything", "Life of the Party" and "The First Time" to help promote the album. The album was released on December 11, 2012.

The lead single "Be Your Everything" was released in the summer of 2012, and entered the Billboard Hot Singles Sales chart at number 18. Its music video ran into heavy rotation on CMT and GAC starting in the fall of 2012. The album debuted and peaked at number 134 on the Billboard 200. It is the only to feature bassist Morgan Dorr and last with guitarist Paul DiGiovanni.

== Background ==
The group began working on their third studio album in 2010, however, after feeling it was "disingenuous" to the band, they scrapped it. According to Martin Johnson, the album originally leaned into an electro-pop hybrid sound and "didn't really feel like Boys Like Girls." Johnson retreated to Nashville, writing with other musicians and creating demos that "didn't have a specific purpose." During that time span, he wrote 300 songs and believed a Boys Like Girls album was hiding in there somewhere and sent the members about 24 tracks. In the fall of 2011, the band reunited at Johnson's home in Los Angeles and used his demos for their third album. Relieved from the pressure of having to recapture top 40 success, they decided to throw "out the idea of having to cater to modern music" and lean into a pop rock and country music sound. In November 2011, the group posted a video announcing the album. However, days after it was uploaded, the band announced bassist Bryan Donahue's departure. Donahue was asked to leave the band and was reported that the reason he was kicked out was due to him having too many plans disrupting the band's progress and was apparently too "engrossed" in his other solo projects, Early Morning Blues and The Tower and the Fool. He was replaced by Morgan Dorr. The group began recording the album in December 2011, posting studio updates. The album was recorded between December 2011 and May 2012, in California and New Jersey.

== Release ==
On June 18, 2012, the group premiered songs from their upcoming third studio album live on their USTREAM. On July 9, previewed a clip of the song "Be Your Everything". On July 12, the group released a lyric video for the song. On July 17, the band released a three-track EP Crazy World, as a preview for their forthcoming album. In support of the EP's release, they embarked on the Crazy Good Summer Concert Series with Austin Mahone on July 19. On August 14, the album's lead single "Be Your Everything" was released along with its music video. From September to October 2012, they embarked on a co-headlining tour with The All-American Rejects to promote the album, with support from the Ready Set and Parachute. On November 4, the band released "Life of the Party" as the album's second single. On November 15, they posted a "Crazy World Song Reveal" page, allowing fans to share a link to it in order to unlock a new song off the new record. On November 8, the album's tracklist was revealed. On November 16, the new track was revealed as "Stuck in the Middle", and the LP was made available for pre-order. Days prior to the release of Crazy World, the band released "Leaving California" and "Hey You" for streaming on SoundCloud. The album was officially released on December 11, 2012. On December 25, the band released a lyric video to "Stuck in the Middle".

== Reception ==
Professional ratings
Aggregate scores
Source	Rating
Metacritic	41/100
Review scores
Source	Rating
AbsolutePunk.net	80%
AllMusic	2.5/5 stars
Alternative Press	1/5 stars
idobi Radio	4/5 stars
Melodic	3/5 stars

Crazy World received mixed reviews from critics. On Metacritic, the album received an average rating of 41, indicating generally "mixed or average reviews". Gregory Robson of AbsolutePunk.net gave the album a positive review stating, "Crazy World is a fine album from a band who seems comfortable with their place in the landscape of contemporary music. Though they are miles removed from the sonic terrain of their humble beginnings, they are surging forward with this new path, and if the amount of potential chart-toppers on Crazy World are any indication, it's a path paved with platinum." Jen Appel of idobi Radio praised the group's songwriting and felt the record was "much stronger than anything else they've released." Johan Wippsson of Melodic wrote, "all the tracks are of high quality, so the album should like the previous ones be a safe buy."

Tim Sendra of AllMusic gave a mixed review for the album remarking, "The only thing that keeps this from sounding like a Jake Owen album is the lack of southern accents, but that would have been hard for a bunch of ex-punks from Boston to pull off. What the album most sounds like is a goofy, brodacious version of Taylor Swift's Red, only with more programming and less heartbreak. It's an open question whether any fans of the group's hooky stadium emo will follow them as they travel south of the Mason-Dixon line; odds are quite a few might feel betrayed by the change in direction and the nagging feeling that maybe the group may have sold out just a little in pursuit of a new audience." Scott Heisel of Alternative Press gave a negative review describing the album as "phony as they come."

== Track listings ==
All lyrics written by Martin Johnson.

No.	Title	Writer(s)	Length
1.	"The First Time"	Martin Johnson	4:26
2.	"Life of the Party"	Johnson, Luke Laird	3:57
3.	"Crazy World"	Johnson, Kevin Griffin	3:56
4.	"Be Your Everything"	Johnson, Rob Hawkins	3:30
5.	"Stuck in the Middle"	Johnson, Brandon Bush, Kristian Bush, John Webb Jr.	3:51
6.	"Cheated"	Johnson, Sam Hollander, Dave Katz, Claude Kelly	3:42
7.	"Shoot"	Johnson, Laird	4:52
8.	"Leaving California"	Johnson, Chris Tompkins	4:09
9.	"Take Me Home"	Johnson, Hawkins	3:46
10.	"Red Cup, Hands Up, Long Brown Hair"	Johnson, Eric Paslay	2:54
11.	"Hey You"	Johnson, Brad Warren, Brett Warren	5:58
Total length:			42:26

Crazy World EP
No.	Title	Writer(s)	Length
1.	"Be Your Everything"	Johnson, Hawkins	3:30
2.	"Life of the Party"	Johnson, Laird	3:57
3.	"The First Time"	Johnson	4:26
Total length:			11:53

== Charts ==
Chart performance for Crazy World
Chart (2012)	Peak position
US Billboard 200	134
