= We Come Running =

Single by Youngblood Hawke

from the album Wake Up and Youngblood Hawke
- Released: August 13, 2012
- Recorded: 2012
- Genre: Indie pop, indie rock, electropop
- Length: 4:07
- Label: Republic
- Songwriters: Samuel Martin, Simon Katz, Matt Squire
- Producers: Simon Katz, Matt Squire

Youngblood Hawke singles chronology
"We Come Running" (2012)	"Stars (Hold On)" (2013)

"We Come Running" is the debut single by American indie pop band Youngblood Hawke. The song was written by Samuel Martin, Simon Katz, and Matt Squire, and was produced by Katz and Squire. It serves as the lead single from their debut studio album, Wake Up, and was also featured on their self-titled extended play. The song reached the top ten of the Billboard Alternative Songs chart in November 2012, peaking at number seven in December. The week of August 20, 2012, "We Come Running" was featured as the "Single of the Week!" by iTunes. The song contains vocals from Simone and the West Los Angeles Children's Choir.

== Critical reception ==
"We Come Running" was met with positive reviews from critics. Rolling Stone said "the song's lush textures shimmer with positivity," also calling the track "energetic" and "triumphant." According to Robert Johnson of Houston Music Review, the song has "a ridiculously catchy hook", "deliciously radiant vibe" and "is the perfect mixture of organic and electronic sounds, with inspirational lyrics to boot." Anne Erickson of Audio Ink Radio called the song "a catchy, candy-coated piece of alternative pop." Paul Lester of The Guardian stated that "there are chanty choruses that will either make you want to hug your neighbour or gouge out your eardrums." Tom Howard of NME said, "...[the song] isn't exactly good...[but] whatever evil is in action here, it's working."

== Music video ==
A music video directed by Marc Klasfeld was released for the song on October 19, 2012. The video features the band performing the song underwater, as well as scuba diving with sharks.

== Live performances ==
The band performed "We Come Running" for the November 14, 2012 episode of Jimmy Kimmel Live!. They also performed it live on Rachael Ray on May 20, 2013, along with "Stars (Hold On)".

== Usage in popular culture ==
- The song was featured on the soundtrack for the video game FIFA 13 by EA Sports.
- The song was featured in a 2013 Coca-Cola commercial.
- The song was used for TeenNick's 2012 Fall Promo

== Track listing ==
A remix EP of the track was released on November 27, 2012.

Digital download
No.	Title	Length
1.	"We Come Running" (Tiësto Remix)	4:29
2.	"We Come Running" (RAC Remix)	4:01
3.	"We Come Running" (The Knocks Remix)	4:59
4.	"We Come Running" (Spacebrother Remix)	4:10
5.	"We Come Running" (Vicetone Remix)	5:47
6.	"We Come Running" (B!ZNiZ Remix)	4:11
Total length:		27:37

== Charts and certifications ==
=== Weekly charts ===
Chart (2012–13)	Peak position
Australia (ARIA)	17
Canada Alternative Rock (America's Music Charts)	17
Slovakia Airplay (ČNS IFPI)	55
US Adult Pop Airplay (Billboard)	26
US Alternative Airplay (Billboard)	7
US Heatseekers Songs (Billboard)	24
US Hot Rock & Alternative Songs (Billboard)	22
US Rock & Alternative Airplay (Billboard)	16

=== Year-end charts ===
Chart (2012)	Position
US Hot Rock Songs (Billboard)	78
US Alternative Songs (Billboard)	46

Chart (2013)	Position
US Alternative Songs (Billboard)	47

=== Certifications ===
Certifications
Region	Certification	Certified units/sales
Australia (ARIA)	Gold	35,000^{^}
United States (RIAA)	Gold	500,000^{‡}
^{^} Shipments figures based on certification alone.^{‡} Sales+streaming figures based on certification alone.
