= Two Is Better Than One =

2009 single by Boys Like Girls featuring Taylor Swift

Single by Boys Like Girls featuring Taylor Swift

from the album Love Drunk
- Released: September 8, 2009
- Recorded: 2008–09
- Studio: Van Howes Studios (Vancouver, BC)
- Genre: Pop rock
- Length: 4:02
- Label: Sony
- Songwriters: Martin Johnson; Taylor Swift
- Producer: Brian Howes

Boys Like Girls singles chronology
"Love Drunk" (2009)	"Two Is Better Than One" (2009)	"Heart Heart Heartbreak" (2010)

Taylor Swift singles chronology
"Fifteen" (2009)	"Two Is Better Than One" (2009)	"Fearless" (2010)

Music video
- "Two Is Better Than One" on YouTube

"Two Is Better Than One" is a song by the American rock band Boys Like Girls from their second studio album Love Drunk (2009). The song features the American singer-songwriter Taylor Swift. It was written by Martin Johnson and Swift. It was released for digital download on September 8, 2009, and was sent to mainstream radio in the United States on October 19 as the band's second single from the album. On some advanced copies of the album sent to reviewers and members of the press, the song does not feature Swift, rather, Johnson handles all vocals.

The track was a commercial success. By August 2012, "Two Is Better Than One" had sold 1,559,000 copies in the United States. It additionally received significant international airplay, reaching number 18 on both the Billboard Hot 100 and Canadian Hot 100.

== Background ==
In an interview with Alter the Press!, bassist Bryan Donahue stated, "she had a piece in the Wall Street Journal, I think, and mentioned us, and our song, 'Hero/Heroine'. A week later, we saw a YouTube video of her covering 'Hero/Heroine' at one of her shows, and we were blown away by that. After that, we got in contact with her [...] We stayed in touch, and when we were in the studio and tracked the song, 'Two Is Better Than One', we were listening to the playback and thought it was good, it was done, but it didn't feel right. We thought it needed the opposite side of the story, the female perspective. We called her up, asked her if she'd be interested, sent her the track, she gave it a listen and she said she would do it. We were very blessed that she said yes because she made that track, and took it to that next step."

== Composition ==
"Two Is Better Than One" was written by Martin Johnson and Taylor Swift, while production was handled by Brian Howes. The song is written in the key of C major with a tempo of 128 beats per minute.

== Music video ==
The music video, directed by Meiert Avis and Jeremy Alter, was released on December 10, 2009. The video shows a couple's relationship, featuring Erik Huffman from Survivor: China and Mika Combs from The Amazing Race 15. Swift does not appear in the video, but her vocals are still heard. The band is shown performing in an empty hall, starting with Johnson playing guitar alone before the rest of the members walk in and join.

A music video e-Card was also released for the song.

== Reception ==
Professional ratings
Review scores
Source	Rating
Billboard	3.5/5 stars

"Two Is Better Than One" was met with mixed reviews from music critics. A positive response came from Michael Menachem of Billboard who stated, "Martin Johnson's falsetto complements Swift's sweet tone, and producer Brian Howes builds an orchestral arrangement around their vocals that would be well-suited to a climactic movie moment." However, a negative review came from Tim Sendra of AllMusic; he described the track as "terrible" and "something Diane Warren would have shelved for being too trite and formulaic." Another negative response came from Gregory Robson of AbsolutePunk.net who felt that Swift's "contributions aren't as promising as one would expect." Rob Sheffield of Rolling Stone remarked, "For some reason, they decided to delay her entrance until a minute into the song, arguably the worst decision in the history of decisions."

=== Accolades ===
Year	Organization	Award	Result	Ref.
2011	BMI Awards	Award-Winning Songs	Won	
2011	BMI Awards	Publisher of the Year	Won	

== Chart performance ==
"Two Is Better Than One" debuted at number 92 on the Billboard Hot 100. It fell off the following week but re-entered at number 79 and rose the following week to number 64. For the week of January 9, 2010, the song then reached its peak at number 18 on the chart. It became Boys Like Girls's first top 20 single on the Billboard Hot 100, becoming their biggest single to date, and Swift's eleventh top 20 single.

By August 2012, "Two Is Better Than One" had sold 1,559,000 copies in the United States. By November 2017, the song had sold 1.7 million copies in the United States.

== Charts ==
=== Weekly charts ===
Weekly chart performance for "Two Is Better Than One"
Chart (2009–2010)	Peak position
Canada (Canadian Hot 100)	18
Canada AC (Billboard)	34
Canada CHR/Top 40 (Billboard)	6
Canada Hot AC (Billboard)	6
South Korea International Chart (GAON)	183
US Billboard Hot 100	18
US Adult Contemporary (Billboard)	29
US Adult Pop Airplay (Billboard)	14
US Pop Airplay (Billboard)	7

=== Year-end charts ===
Year-end chart performance for "Two Is Better Than One"
Chart (2010)	Position
Canada (Canadian Hot 100)	67
US Billboard Hot 100	72
US Mainstream Top 40 (Billboard)	40

== Certifications ==
Certifications for "Two Is Better Than One"
Region	Certification	Certified units/sales
Canada (Music Canada)	Gold	40,000^{*}
United States (RIAA)	Platinum	1,000,000^{*}
^{*} Sales figures based on certification alone.

== Release history ==
Release dates and formats for "Two Is Better Than One"
Region	Date	Format	Label(s)	Ref.
United States	October 19, 2009	Mainstream airplay	Columbia	
