= Matt Squire =

American record producer, audio engineer, mixing engineer, and songwriter

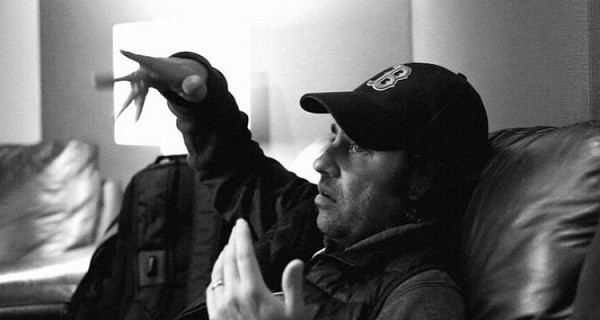
- Squire in 2018

Background information
- Born: Matthew Bach Squire
- Origin: Washington, D.C.
- Genres: Pop; punk rock; power pop; alternative rock; indie rock; pop punk
- Occupations: Record producer; audio engineer; mixing engineer; songwriter
- Years active: 2002–present

Matt Squire is an American record producer, audio engineer, mixing engineer, and songwriter. His production, songwriting, and mixing credits include Panic! at the Disco, Ariana Grande, Sabrina Carpenter, Demi Lovato, Selena Gomez, Kesha, One Direction, Huddy, 3OH!3, Charli XCX, Palaye Royale, Katy Perry, The Maine, Big Time Rush, Metallica, Bea Miller, The Warning, Alessia Cara, Hollywood Undead, Neck Deep, Krewella, Sum 41, Simple Plan, All Time Low, SeeYouSpaceCowboy, Good Charlotte, Underoath, Boys Like Girls, The Amity Affliction, The Used, HIM, Will Wood and Taking Back Sunday.

== Career ==
In 2006, Squire had his first big success with Panic! at the Disco on A Fever You Can't Sweat Out. From there, he went on to work with several bands in the emo scene with many crossovers into pop and other genres.

== Squire Tech ==
In 2024, Squire launched an online recording, streaming and communications app called Flash Mob.

== Life ==
Matt Squire grew up in the Washington DC area. He played in locals bands like Ashes. He attended the Georgetown Day School and graduated from Boston University in 1999. He is married to Alexandra Squire and has 3 daughters.

== Discography ==
w - writer, p - producer, m - mixed, e - engineered, d - digital editing, ma - mastered

=== Albums ===
- 3OH!3 - Streets of Gold (w/p/e)
- 3OH!3 - Want (p/m/e)
- All Time Low - Dirty Work (w/p)
- All Time Low - Nothing Personal (w/p/e)*
- All Time Low - So Wrong, It's Right (p/m/e)
- The Amity Affliction - Misery (w/p)
- The Amity Affliction - Everyone Loves You... Once You Leave Them (p,e)
- Ariana Grande - Yours Truly (c-w/c-p)*
- Big Time Rush - Windows Down (w/p)
- Bleeder Resistor - 16 (p/m/e)
- Boys Like Girls - Boys Like Girls (p/m/e)
- Breathe Carolina - Hello Fascination (p/m/e)*
- Cute Is What We Aim For - The Same Old Blood Rush with a New Touch (p/m/e)
- David Archuleta - “The Other Side of Down” (p)
- Forever The Sickest Kids - The Weekend: Friday (p)
- Good Charlotte - Cardiology (w)*
- Have Mercy - The Love Life (p)
- HIM - Screamworks: Love in Theory and Practice (p)
- Hit The Lights - This Is a Stick Up... Don't Make It a Murder (p/m/e)
- Hollywood Undead - Day of the Dead (w/p)*
- Monty Are I - Wall of People (p/m/e)
- Monty Are I - Break Through the Silence (p/e)
- Neck Deep - All Distortions Are Intentional (p/e)
- Northstar - Pollyanna (p/m/e)
- Panic! at the Disco - A Fever You Can't Sweat Out (p/m/e)
- People In Planes - Beyond The Horizon (p/e)
- Plain White T's - Parallel Universe (w/p)
- Renee Heartfelt - Death of the Ghost (p/m/e)
- Saosin - In Search of Solid Ground (w)*
- SeeYouSpaceCowboy - Coup de Grâce (p)
- Simple Plan - Get Your Heart On (w)*
- Skindred - Roots Rock Riot (p)
- So They Say - Antidote for Irony (p/e)
- Taking Back Sunday - New Again (p/e)*
- The Almost - Fear Caller (p)
- The Cab - Whisper War (p/m/e)
- The Junior Varsity - Wide Eyed (e)
- The Maine - Can't Stop Won't Stop (p/m/e)
- The Maine - You Are OK (p/e)
- The Receiving End of Sirens - Between the Heart and the Synapse (p)
- The Receiving End of Sirens - The Earth Sings Mi Fa Mi (p/m/e)
- The Receiving End of Sirens - The Receiving End of Sirens EP (p/e)
- The Static Age - Neon Nights Electric Lives (p/m/e)
- The Used - Artwork (p/e)
- The Warning - Keep Me Fed (c-w)
- Toothgrinder - I AM (w/p/m/e)
- Underoath - Erase Me (p)
- Youngblood Hawke - Wake Up (w/p)*
- Youngblood Hawke - We Come Running (w/p)
- Songs to Listen to in a Wendy's Parking Lot - EP Wendy's (w/p)

=== Singles ===
- 3OH!3 ft. Katy Perry - "Starstrukk" (p/e)
- Against The Current - "that won't save us" (w/p/e)
- American Vanity - "Lifeline" (p)
- Ariana Grande - "Put Your Hearts Up" (w/p)
- Bea Miller - "Rich Kids" (w/p)
- Bea Miller - "This Is Not An Apology" (w/p)
- Big Time Rush - "Paralyzed" from Elevate (w)
- Demi Lovato - "Without The Love" (c-w/p)
- Dreamers - "To The Fire" (c-w/a-p)
- David Archuleta - “Parachutes and Airplanes” (w)
- David Cook - “4 Letter Word” (w)
- Greyson Chance - "Heart Like Stone" (p)
- Hollywood Undead - "War Child" (c-p)
- Katy Perry - "I Kissed a Girl" (rock mix)
- Kesha - "Dirty Love" (c-w/c-p)
- Krewella & DISKORD - "Beggars" (w)
- Krewella - "Somewhere To Run" (p)
- Mowgli's - "Make It Right" (w)
- One Direction - "Up All Night" and "Na Na Na" (w/p)
- Sabrina Carpenter - "White Flag" (w/p)
- Selena Gomez - "Sick of You" (w/p)
- Sum 41 - "Baby You Don't Wanna Know" (w)
- Sum 41 - "Twisted By Design" (c-w)
- The Ghost Club - "This Bird Has Flown" (p)
- The Ghost Club - "Hey There Rose" (p)
- The Ready Set - "More Than Alive" (w)
- Will Wood - “Love, Me Normally” (p/m/e)

* select tracks

== Accomplishments ==
Band	Album/single	RIAA certification
Panic! at the Disco	A Fever You Can't Sweat Out - Album	Double Platinum
Panic! at the Disco	"I Write Sins Not Tragedies" - Single	Double Platinum
Ariana Grande	"The Way" - Single	Double Platinum
Boys Like Girls	Boys Like Girls - Album	Gold
Boys Like Girls	"The Great Escape" - Single	Platinum
Boys Like Girls	"Hero/Heroine" - Single	Gold
Boys Like Girls	"Thunder" - Single	Gold
3OH!3	"Starstrukk" (feat. Katy Perry) - Single	Platinum
3OH!3	Want - Album	Gold
Selena Gomez & the Scene	A Year Without Rain - Album	Gold
Words Left Unsaid	"Demons" - Single	Platinum
Airspoken	Sell Out - Album	Platinum
