= You'll Always Find Your Way Back Home =

2009 song by Miley Cyrus

Song by Hannah Montana

from the album Hannah Montana: The Movie
- Recorded: 2008
- Genre: Country pop; pop rock
- Length: 3:44
- Label: Walt Disney
- Songwriters: Taylor Swift; Martin Johnson
- Producer: Matthew Gerrard

"You'll Always Find Your Way Back Home" is a song by fictional character Hannah Montana, recorded by American singer and actress Miley Cyrus for the soundtrack to the film Hannah Montana: The Movie (2009). Written by American singer-songwriters Taylor Swift and Martin Johnson, the country pop and pop rock song is about staying grounded and going back to one's roots.

The song received positive reviews from music critics for its use in the film. "You'll Always Find Your Way Back Home" underperformed commercially compared to Cyrus' other singles, peaking at 81 on the Billboard Hot 100 in the United States and 76 in Canada. The song was certified platinum by the Recording Industry Association of America (RIAA) for sales exceeding 1,000,000 units. A music video was released in March 2009 to coincide with the home release of Hannah Montana: The Movie.

== Background and release ==
American singer-songwriter Taylor Swift became involved with Hannah Montana: The Movie when filmmakers emailed her specifically to request the use of her music in the film. Swift agreed to make a cameo appearance in the film to sing "Crazier" as well as to co-write a song with Boys Like Girls lead singer Martin Johnson. In an interview with MTV, Johnson described working with Swift:

"She's awesome. She's one of the most talented songwriters to work with, if not, the best. For such a young girl, she's so creative and spot-on. She knows the audience, she truly understands the kind of pop music that is from the heart and done in a tasteful way. She knows ways to make things pop and also make you feel it at the same time. We wrote a bunch of songs together and it was a lot of fun."

"You'll Always Find Your Way Back Home" is used as the closing number of Hannah Montana: The Movie. In the film, Cyrus performs as popstar Hannah Montana onstage at an outdoor fundraiser to save her hometown's treasured park from developers. More than 2,000 extras were used to film the scene. A karaoke version of the song is available in the soundtrack's karaoke series.

== Composition ==
"You'll Always Find Your Way Back Home" (2009)
A sample of Hannah Montana's "You'll Always Find Your Way Back Home".

"You'll Always Find Your Way Back Home", according to AllMusic, embodies the album's theme of merging country and pop music. It is set in common time with a fast rock tempo of 160 beats per minute. The song is written in the key of E♭ major. Cyrus' vocals span from B♭_{3} to C♯_{5}. The song uses the chord progression E♭5—D5—E♭5. Like the film, the lyrics discuss importance of one's roots. Warren Truitt of About.com opined it conveyed "the sentiment that even pop stars find safe haven in their home town". The first few lyrics of the song's chorus are almost identical to the opening verse in Hilary Duff's song "So Yesterday" (2003).

== Critical reception ==
The song received positive reviews from critics. Referring to "You'll Always Find Your Way Back Home", Simon Weaving of Screenwize.com said the film's conflicts are "mostly expressed in the simple, sugared lyrics of a series of pop hits that seamlessly find their way into the story." James Plath of Dvdtown.com described the song as being "integrated pretty well into the narrative". Peter Canavese of Grouncho Reviews argued that the song would successfully attract "the film's target audience of pre-teen girls". Warren of Truitt of About.com listed the song as the third best song by Hannah Montana. The song was included on the short list for Best Original Song at the 82nd Academy Awards.

== Commercial performance ==
"You'll Always Find Your Way Back Home" debuted on the Billboard Hot 100 at number 87 on the week ending April 11, 2009, eventually peaking at 81 on the week ending May 2, 2009 thanks to digital downloads that simultaneously placed it at number fifty-two on Hot Digital Songs. On the Canadian Hot 100, the track debuted at number 88 on the week ending April 11, 2009, and peaked at number 76 on the week ending May 2, 2009.

== Music video ==
A promotional music video for "You'll Always Find Your Way Back Home" was filmed in correlation to the Hannah Montana: The Movie soundtrack. The video, part of a series of promotional videos titled The Miley Sessions, was released in March 2009 on Disney.com and features Cyrus singing in a vacant recording studio.

An excerpt from Hannah Montana: The Movie premiered as the song's music video in August 2009 on Disney Channel to promote the home release of the film. The video begins with Cyrus and her backup dancers atop a stage in a crowded outdoor concert. Cyrus is dressed as Hannah Montana and is wearing a business suit. As Cyrus begins singing, she and the dancers engage in intricate choreography. The video then transitions to a clip from Hannah Montana: The Movie in which Cyrus' character is disembarking from a private airplane. The video continues to alternate between Cyrus performing and more film clips; scenes include Stewart taking off her Hannah Montana wig and interacting with Travis Body, her love interest in the film, portrayed by actor Lucas Till. Midway through the video, Cyrus and her dancers exit the stage through a back door and instantly enter sporting western clothing with Cyrus in a western teal button up shirt, a checkered red and white table cloth with purple ruffles pettiskirt or a petticoat, and cowboy boots. As the video ends, Cyrus wakes up in a car and realizes it was a dream.

== Charts ==
Weekly chart performance for "You'll Always Find Your Way Back Home"
Chart (2009)	Peak position
Canada Hot 100 (Billboard)	76
US Billboard Hot 100	81

== Certifications ==
Region	Certification	Certified units/sales
New Zealand (RMNZ)	Gold	15,000^{‡}
United Kingdom (BPI)	Silver	200,000^{‡}
United States (RIAA)	Platinum	1,000,000^{‡}
^{‡} Sales+streaming figures based on certification alone.
