= Robbers (Youngblood Hawke song) =

Single by Youngblood Hawke

from the album Edge of the World
- Released: June 14, 2017
- Recorded: 2017
- Genre: Experimental pop, new wave, electronica
- Length: 4:58
- Label: Youngblood Hawke LLC

Youngblood Hawke singles chronology
"Landslide" (2016)	"Robbers" (2017)	"Trust" (2018)

"Robbers" is a song by American indie pop band Youngblood Hawke. It is the second single under the band's new independent record label, Youngblood Hawke LLC, after 2015's "Knock Me Down".

== Background ==
The band announced in May 2017 via Twitter "New music coming 6/16!", later revealed to be a new song called "Robbers". The song was released two days early on SoundCloud.

A lyric video was released on June 30.

== Composition ==
Speaking of the song's lyrical meaning, the band said, "'Robbers' addresses the dizzying experience of our modern world. The single is a flashing collage of technology, violence, planetary exploitation and the comforts of hometown roads changing before your eyes."

IndScene commented that the band is exploring and evolving, saying the track is "an experimental departure from their signature sound." Buzz Bands LA spoke of the song's musical composition, writing, "The single is a caffeinated collision of robo-vox, digi-claps and junk-drawer beats that reaches the edge at the 3-minute mark, with an acoustic guitar-driven bridge that stares into the abyss."

== Critical reception ==
"Robbers" has been met with critical acclaim. William Tomer of The 405 called the song "stunning", and "an addicting and anthemic pop track, the kind you can't help but listen to over and over again." He also praised the song's lyrical content. Kevin Bronson of Buzz Bands LA also wrote highly of the single, claiming, "If you’re of a mind to dance your way toward the apocalypse, you’ve come to the right place." Teri of The Girls at the Rock Show deemed the song "thunderous and addicting". Phil King of Audio Fuzz highlighted the song's originality, praising the band's ability to blend genres.
