= Be Your Everything =

Single by Boys Like Girls

from the album Crazy World
- Released: August 14, 2012
- Genre: Country
- Length: 3:30
- Label: Columbia
- Songwriters: Martin Johnson; Rob Hawkins
- Producer: Johnson

Boys Like Girls singles chronology
"Heart Heart Heartbreak" (2010)	"Be Your Everything" (2012)	"Life of the Party" (2012)

Music video
- "Be Your Everything" on YouTube

"Be Your Everything" is a song by American rock band Boys Like Girls. The song was released on August 14, 2012, as the lead single from their third studio album, Crazy World. The song peaked at number 18 on the US Hot Singles Sales chart.

== Background ==
On July 9, previewed a clip of the song "Be Your Everything". On July 12, the group released a lyric video for the song. Martin Johnson said of the song, "It's a great transition from where the band was. We came from a wall of guitars, and the sound has evolved. The only time I really express my feelings is when I'm writing music. That's how it's been since I was a little kid. This song is about the moment when it becomes okay to say, I love you."

== Composition ==
"Be Your Everything" was written and produced by Martin Johnson, as well being co-written by Rob Hawkins. The song marks a departure from their early pop punk and emo roots and into a more country pop leaning sound. The track has also been described as a ballad.

== Music video ==
On August 14, the band released the music video to "Be Your Everything". The video was directed by David McClister. Video features Allie Gonino.

== Personnel ==
Credits for "Be Your Everything" adapted from album's liner notes.

Boys Like Girls

- Martin Johnson – lead vocals, rhythm guitar, percussion, mandolin
- Paul DiGiovanni – lead guitar
- Morgan Dorr – bass guitar
- John Keefe – drums

Additional musicians

- Rob Hawkins – guitar
- Bill Appleberry – hammond organ, wurlitzer piano
- Brian Nash – piano

Production

- Martin Johnson – producer, string arranger
- Jean Paul Makhlouf – engineer, programming
- Alex Makhlouf – programming
- Kyle Moorman – engineer
- Will Sandalls – engineer
- Eric Stenman – assistant engineer, editing
- Chris Lord-Alge – mixing
- Ted Jensen – mastering
- Keith Armstrong – assistant engineer
- Nik Karpen – assistant engineer
- Brad Townsend – mixing
- Andrew Schuber – mixing

== Charts ==
Chart performance for "Be Your Everything"
Chart (2012)	Peak position
CIS Airplay (TopHit)	185
Singapore Airplay (Mediacorp)	8
US Hot Singles Sales (Billboard)	18

== Release history ==
Release dates and formats for "Be Your Everything"
Region	Date	Format	Label(s)	Ref.
United States	September 11, 2012	Mainstream airplay	Columbia	
