= Put Your Hearts Up =

2011 debut single by Ariana Grande

Promotional single by Ariana Grande
- Released: December 12, 2011
- Recorded: 2011
- Genre: Bubblegum pop
- Length: 3:30
- Label: Universal Republic
- Songwriters: Linda Perry; Martin Johnson; Matt Squire
- Producer: Matt Squire

Audio video
- "Put Your Hearts Up" on YouTube

"Put Your Hearts Up" is a promotional single by American singer-songwriter Ariana Grande. It was released on December 12, 2011, by Universal Republic. The song interpolates "What's Up?" (1993) by 4 Non Blondes.

== Background and composition ==
Grande began working on her debut album while she was filming Victorious and formally started to work on it with a record label after she was signed to Universal Republic Records on August 10, 2011. By September 10, Grande already had twenty songs prepared and was going through the process of narrowing it down to thirteen.

"Put Your Hearts Up" was written by Matt Squire, Linda Perry and Martin Johnson. It was released as her first single on December 12, 2011. Despite not appearing on her debut album Yours Truly, it was intended as the lead single for the album at the time of release. "Put Your Hearts Up" is a "50s, 60s doo-wop-inspired" bubblegum pop song which talks about making the world a better place.

== Release and cover ==
Grande let her fans choose the song's cover by allowing them to vote on four possible covers for the single via her Twitter account. After fans voted, the cover was chosen and the release date for the single was announced via Twitter on November 29, 2011. "Put Your Hearts Up" was originally going to be released on December 20, 2011, but was released earlier. "Put Your Hearts Up" premiered on On Air with Ryan Seacrest on December 9, 2011, and became available for digital download through iTunes three days later.

== After release ==
In an interview on Kidd Kraddick in the Morning she said, "It was a learning experience for sure. Sonically it's just not my vibe. I think it would've been a great hit song for somebody else maybe, but it's just not what I like to sing. It's a bubblegum pop record for sure, and I like to sing stuff that's a little more soulful. I love pop music, I'm a huge pop music fan, but I just didn't think that that record was right for me." In an interview published in the August 2013 issue of Seventeen, Grande said, "It was bubblegum pop, which isn't me, but it was something I thought my fans wanted."

In an interview with Rolling Stone in 2014, Grande said that "Put Your Hearts Up" "was geared toward kids and felt so inauthentic and fake. That was the worst moment of my life. For the video, they gave me a bad spray tan and put me in a princess dress and had me frolic around the street. The whole thing was straight out of hell. I still have nightmares about it, and I made them hide it on my Vevo page."

In a 2020 interview with Zach Sang, she stated that she doesn't hate the record but didn't feel it was an accurate reflection of her as a overall artist or person due to her "Cat persona" on Victorious. She also stated she was in an uncomfortable position at the time when the song came out and had no interest in recording "bubblegum pop" music as this was a song that was written when she was writing songs for Victorious.

== Music video ==
The music video for "Put Your Hearts Up" was shot on November 23, 2011. It was directed by Meiert Avis and Jeremy Alter. On February 14, 2012, the official music video was uploaded on YouTube under ArianaGrandeVevo at a length of 3 minutes and 49 seconds. The video had gained more than 40 million views as of May 2014. In the video, Grande walks through the streets of a city sending love to lonely people while dancing and singing. Prior to this, the video had been uploaded by other channels.

Later in March 2013, when "The Way" music video was released, the music video for "Put Your Hearts Up" was made unlisted on Grande's Vevo account at Grande's request. The video was then made public again in April 2014 and was deleted shortly after.

== Commercial performance ==
The single sold 170,000 downloads by August 2013. On July 20, 2014, it was certified gold by the Recording Industry Association of America (RIAA), for combined sales and streams of 500,000 units in the US.

== Certifications ==
Certifications for "Put Your Hearts Up"
Region	Certification	Certified units/sales
United States (RIAA)	Gold	500,000^{‡}
^{‡} Sales+streaming figures based on certification alone.
