= Youngblood Hawke (band) =

American indie pop band

- Origin: Los Angeles, California, U.S.
- Genres: Indie rock; indie pop; electropop
- Years active: 2012–present
- Label: Republic
- Members: Nik Hughes; Alice Katz; Simon Katz; Samuel Martin; Omar Ahmed; Tasso Smith

Youngblood Hawke is an American indie pop band based in Los Angeles, California.

== History ==
Both Simon Katz and lead singer Sam Martin were in the band Iglu & Hartly, but after a 2011 hiatus, the two reformed with three of their long-time friends to form Youngblood Hawke. Their name is taken from the Herman Wouk novel of the same name. In October 2011, before landing a recording contract with Universal Republic, Youngblood had a residency at The Satellite in Los Angeles. Aside from that, the group has performed at South by Southwest, playing showcases such as Comedy Central Workaholics showcase, and Purevolume House.

The band was based in Silverlake, Los Angeles, where they were working on their debut album and worked odd jobs on the side during the recording process. Youngblood Hawke's first single "We Come Running", was described by LA Weekly's Kevin Bronson as showing the quintet's "skills at grabbing hold of the pop jugular vein". Their track "Forever" was the Starbucks Pick of the Week for September 2012. Before that, they joined the lineup for both the Echo Park Rising Festival as well as Lobsterfest. "We Come Running" was also featured on the soundtrack for the association football video game FIFA 13. "We Come Running" was also used in the first episode of The 100. In 2014, another song from their debut album, "Stars", was featured in a commercial for the streaming service Netflix.

Youngblood Hawke's video for their debut single "We Come Running" was featured on Rolling Stone, "where they play music and scuba dive with sharks in time" in hopes to help promote the conservation of sharks.

In the process of recording their second studio album the band released its lead single "Pressure" in early 2014. They "plan[ned] on releasing a cover song accompanied by a band-made music video every month until the album [was] released," starting with Private Eyes by Hall & Oates which was released on March 2, 2015.

The band's song "Knock Me Down" was released on July 30, 2015, as the second single from the band's forthcoming second album. A lyric video for the song was released on May 30, 2017, nearly two years after its initial release. Meanwhile, the song was featured in a commercial for PlayStation 4 and also in the UFC documentary Road to the Octagon. The song was later used in an Applebee's commercial and was also featured in the soundtrack for Madden NFL 16.

The band's song "Robbers" was released on June 15, 2017. Another single called "Trust", co-written and co-produced by Andrew Taggart of The Chainsmokers, was released on February 9, 2018.

On July 28, 2020, the band announced their second full-length album Edge of the World, which was released on October 9, 2020. The album's lead single "Waking Up the World" was released on August 6 via the band's SoundCloud channel, one day prior to the song's scheduled release date. The album's second single called "Criminals" was released on August 28, followed by "Find a Way" as the album's third and final single on September 18.

Buzz Bands LA touched on the band's extended hiatus, writing "[the band] has been in the background, ensconced in things like day jobs, solo projects, musical collaborations and impending parenthood."

In 2021 Sam Martin released a solo single called "Patience" under the name Sunshine Boysclub.

== Discography ==
=== Studio albums ===
List of studio albums, with selected chart positions and certifications
Title	Album details	Peak chart positions
Title	Album details	US
Wake Up	Released: April 23, 2013; Label: Universal Republic Records; Formats: CD, LP, digital download	58
Edge of the World	Released: October 9, 2020; Label: Youngblood Hawke; Formats: CD, LP, digital download	—

=== Extended plays ===
List of extended plays, with selected chart positions
Title	Album details	Peak chart positions	
Title	Album details	US	US Heat
Youngblood Hawke	Released: August 14, 2012 (US); Label: Universal Republic Records; Formats: CD, digital download	193	3

=== Singles ===
Year	Single	Peak chart positions				Certifications	Album
Year	Single	US Alt	US Rock	Canada Alt	AUS	Certifications	Album
2012	"We Come Running"	7	22	17	17	ARIA: Gold; RIAA: Gold	Wake Up
2013	"Stars (Hold On)"	—	—	—	—		Wake Up
2014	"Pressure"	—	—	—	—		Non-album single
2015	"Knock Me Down"	—	—	—	—		Edge of the World
2016	"Landslide" (with Vicetone)	—	—	—	—		Non-album single
2017	"Robbers"	—	—	—	—		Edge of the World
2018	"Trust"	—	—	—	—		Edge of the World
2020	"Waking Up the World"	—	—	—	—		Edge of the World
2020	"Criminals"	—	—	—	—		Edge of the World
2020	"Find a Way"	—	—	—	—		Edge of the World

=== Featured singles ===
Year	Single	Album
2013	"Big City Lights" (Sinead Burgess featuring Youngblood Hawke)	Non-album singles
2014	"Wolves" (DiGiTALiSM featuring Youngblood Hawke)	Non-album singles
2014	"Endless Summer" (Miracle featuring Youngblood Hawke)	Mainland
2014	"Live Like We'll Never Die" (Chiddy Bang featuring Youngblood Hawke)	Earth to Echo: Music From the Motion Picture

=== Other appearances ===
List of non-single guest appearances, showing year released and album name
Title	Year	Album
"Culprit"	2013	The Walking Dead: Songs of Survival
"Bring Me Home"	2013	The Mortal Instruments: City of Bones (Original Motion Picture Soundtrack)
"Collide"	2014	Non-album single
