= Thunder (Boys Like Girls song) =

2008 single by Boys Like Girls

Single by Boys Like Girls

from the album Boys Like Girls
- Released: May 6, 2008
- Genre: Pop rock; emo pop
- Length: 3:57
- Label: Columbia, Red Ink
- Songwriter: Martin Johnson
- Producer: Matt Squire

Boys Like Girls singles chronology
"The Great Escape" (2007)	"Thunder" (2008)	"Love Drunk" (2009)

Music video
- "Thunder" on YouTube

"Thunder" is a song by American pop rock band Boys Like Girls. It was released on May 6, 2008, as the third and final single from their debut studio album, Boys Like Girls (2006). Despite its low chart performance on the Billboard Hot 100, peaking at number 76, compared to their previous singles, it was certified Gold by the Recording Industry Association of America.

== Background ==
"Thunder" was the first song Boys Like Girls ever wrote. The song was written about Martin's high school sweetheart, which he stated, "She will always move me even if we went different paths. The song is basically a promise that I will never forget what we had." There are two versions of the song, the album version and the radio mix version, which the latter features overlapping vocals towards the end of the song.

== Composition ==
"Thunder" was written by Martin Johnson and produced by Matt Squire. According to the sheet music published at Musicnotes.com, by Alfred Music Publishing, the track runs at 76 BPM and is in the key of D major. Johnson's range in the song spans from the notes G3 to A5. The lyrics highlight how special first love can be: "Your eyes are the brightest of all the colors / I don't ever want to love another / You'll always be my thunder."

== Critical reception ==
Richard Brown of Culture Deluxe stated, "the Boston four piece successfully take the timeless simplicity of 'Wonderwall', coat it in the same varnish recently employed by Iglu & Hartly and deliver a song so accurately aimed at teen girls." Alex Lai of ContactMusic.com remarked, "it is a decent enough sing-a-long, though quite why a radio remix has been sanctioned is baffling as the closing seconds are a mess of vocal overlaps. Far from a representation of their usual songs, those who are fans of the genre could do worse than check this outfit out when looking for their next fix." On Alternative Press' readers poll of the "5 Best Boys Like Girls Songs", the song was ranked at number one.

== Accolades ==
Accolades for "Thunder"
Publication	Country	Accolade	Year	Rank	Ref.
About.com	United States	Top 100 Songs of 2008	2008	75	

== Chart performance ==
"Thunder" debuted on the Billboard Hot 100 at number 88 on the week ending July 12, 2008. The song peaked at number 76 on the Billboard hot 100. It also reached number 21 on the Pop Airplay chart, selling 350,000 copies by November 2008. As of December 2009, the single was certified Gold by the Recording Industry Association of America and sold 600,000 copies.

== Music video ==
The music video for "Thunder", directed by Josh Forbes, was released on June 20, 2008, and premiered on FNMTV, shows a group of friends, which includes couples hanging out. The music video is a reflection of teenage youth, including scenes of food fights, late-night hangs, and swimming pool makeouts. Throughout the video, the band is shown performing the song in the rain.

The video was shot in many different locations throughout Cerritos, California, a suburb in southeast Los Angeles county, which include: the Tall Mouse Crafts store off South Street and Carmenita Road, Jack's Restaurant on Carmenita and South Street, Cerritos Park East Park/Rec Center off Ironbark Drive and 166th Street, Cerritos Park East Swim Center off 166th Street and Carmenita, and a commercial parking structure off Towne Center Drive and Park Plaza Drive near the Cerritos Towne Center and across the street from the Cerritos Millennium Library. The main location where the band is seen playing in the street is Droxford St. and Pinewood Circle, a cul-de-sac in Cerritos.

== Track listing ==
CD single
No.	Title	Length
1.	"Thunder" (radio edit)	3:56

Digital download
No.	Title	Length
1.	"Thunder" (radio mix)	3:58
2.	"Thunder" (acoustic)	3:54
3.	"Thunder" (music video)	3:57

== Personnel ==
Credits for "Thunder" adapted from album's liner notes.

Boys Like Girls

- Martin Johnson – lead vocals, rhythm guitar
- Paul DiGiovanni – lead guitar, backing vocals
- Bryan Donahue – bass guitar, backing vocals
- John Keefe – drums, percussion

Production

- Matt Squire – producer, engineer, mixing
- George Marino – mastering

== Charts ==
=== Weekly charts ===
Weekly chart performance for "Thunder"
Chart (2008)	Peak position
US Billboard Hot 100	76
US Pop Airplay (Billboard)	21

=== Year-end charts ===
Year-end chart performance for "Thunder"
Chart (2008)	Position
Singapore Airplay (Mediacorp)	65

== Certifications ==
Certifications for "Thunder"
Region	Certification	Certified units/sales
United States (RIAA)	Gold	500,000^{*}
^{*} Sales figures based on certification alone.

== Release history ==
Release dates for "Thunder"
Region	Date	Format	Label	Ref.
United States	May 6, 2008	Contemporary hit radio	Columbia	
Various	December 1, 2008	Digital download	Sony Music Entertainment	
