= Love Drunk =

Studio album by Boys Like Girls
- Released: September 8, 2009
- Studios: Van Howes; Fresh Kills Music; Monster Island Recording; Right Hook
- Genres: Pop rock; pop-punk; power pop; alternative rock
- Length: 43:09
- Labels: Columbia; Red Ink
- Producers: Brian Howes; S*A*M & Sluggo

Boys Like Girls chronology
Boys Like Girls (2006)	Love Drunk (2009)	Crazy World (2012)

Singles from Love Drunk
- 1. "Love Drunk" Released: June 30, 2009; 2. "Two Is Better Than One" Released: October 19, 2009; 3. "Heart Heart Heartbreak" Released: April 13, 2010

Love Drunk is the second studio album by the American pop rock band Boys Like Girls, released on September 8, 2009, by Columbia Records. The album was recorded in New York City and Vancouver because there are "two different producers/production teams, two different environments, and two different styles of inspiration" stated by the band's frontman Martin Johnson. The album peaked at #8 on the Billboard 200, making it the biggest hit for the band. Its lead single, the title track was released on July 7, 2009, shortly followed by "She's Got a Boyfriend Now", "Two Is Better Than One" featuring Taylor Swift, and "Heart Heart Heartbreak". This is the last album to feature bassist Bryan Donahue before his departure in 2011.

== Development and production ==
"Love Drunk", "Two Is Better Than One", "Contagious", and "The First One" were recorded at Van Howes Studios in Vancouver, Canada, with producer Brian Howes and engineer Jay "JVP" Van Poederooyen. Poederooyen digitally edited the songs, with assistance from Bryan "Tatoo" Coisne; Misha Rajaratnam did additional editing. "Heart Heart Heartbreak", "She's Got a Boyfriend Now", "Real Thing", "The Shot Heard 'Round the World", "Chemicals Collide", and "Go" were recorded at Fresh Kills Music in New York City, with producers S*A*M and Sluggo; Johnson co-produced the songs. Sean Gould engineered the tracks, with assistance from Grant Michaels.

Mark Caffrey did drum and bass engineering at Monster Island Recording Studios, also in New York City. Mark Maxwell did additional production on "Heart Heart Heartbreak", "She's Got a Boyfriend Now", "Real Thing", "The Shot Heard 'Round the World", and "Chemicals Collide". Chad Royce and Scott Mann engineered strings at Right Hook Studios, also in New York City. Tom Lord-Alge mixed the album at South Beach Studios in Miami, Florida, with assistance from Femio Hernandez, before it was mastered by Vlado Meller at Universal Mastering in New York City.

With nearly 80 tracks written for Love Drunk, the album draws "influences from all across the board, from every type of music." The album is described as "more grown-up lyrically and musically," straying away from their earlier youth, angsty and whiny sound as presented on their debut studio album.

== Release ==
On May 20, 2009, the band posted a street team announcement about "participating in various online and street promotions to help BLG get the word out about the new album." On June 18, Love Drunk was announced for release in September. On June 25, 2009, the band streamed "Love Drunk" on their MySpace site. "Love Drunk" was released as the album's lead single on June 30. The song was sent to radio on July 7. In the same month, the band went on tour with Never Shout Never and the Ready Set. On the radio show Kidd Kraddick in the Morning, an acoustic version of "Two Is Better Than One" was premiered. In August 2009, the band performed at the Summer Sonic Festival in Japan. The music video for "Love Drunk" premiered on MTV on August 3, and features actress Ashley Tisdale. "She's Got a Boyfriend Now" was released as a digital single on August 11. "Heart Heart Heartbreak" was released on the band's PureVolume on August 17, as a result of reaching 250,000 fans on their Facebook. A 30-second preview of every song on the album was subsequently uploaded to YouTube, and then began officially streaming on their MySpace. Love Drunk was released on September 8 through major label Columbia Records. A deluxe edition of Love Drunk was also released through iTunes. In October and November 2009, the band embarked on a headlining US tour, with support from Cobra Starship, the Maine, A Rocket to the Moon and VersaEmerge. "Two Is Better Than One" is a collaboration with Taylor Swift and the official second single from Love Drunk. The single was released for airplay on October 19, 2009. "Heart Heart Heartbreak" is the album's third single. The song was officially sent to U.S. radio on April 13, 2010.

== Critical reception ==
Professional ratings
Review scores
Source	Rating
AbsolutePunk	(67%)
AllMusic	3/5 stars
Alternative Press	3/5 stars
Billboard	(73/100)
Blogcritics	(favorable)
Melodic	4/5 stars
Sputnikmusic	1.5/5 stars

The album was met with mixed to positive reviews from music critics. Jon Caramanica of The New York Times remarked, "Love Drunk is, in places, a pleasant improvement, with the band's brattier instincts tamped down. Produced by Brian Howes and the team of S*A*M and Sluggo (the auteurs of arena emo), it's appealingly diverse." However he described the title track as "a brazen rip-off of the Killers' 'Somebody Told Me'." Tim Sendra of AllMusic stated, "the band sticks to the same basic template of super slick, glossily produced emo pop with uptempo songs that sound stadium singalong-friendly and ballads that seem destined to melt teenage girls' hearts. The difference this time is that the songs are better-written and hookier, especially the rockers."

== Commercial performance ==
The album peaked at number eight on the Billboard 200 and in its first week of release, the album sold 41,000 copies. The album reached number one on the US Top Rock Albums and Top Alternative Albums chart. As of December 2012, the album has sold 230,000 copies in the United States.

== Track listing ==
Writing credits per booklet.

Standard Edition
No.	Title	Writer(s)	Length
1.	"Heart Heart Heartbreak"	Johnson; Sam Hollander; Dave Katz	3:24
2.	"Love Drunk"	Johnson; Hollander; Katz	3:46
3.	"She's Got a Boyfriend Now"	Johnson; Hollander; Katz	4:05
4.	"Two Is Better Than One" (featuring Taylor Swift)	Johnson	4:02
5.	"Contagious"	Johnson; Brian Howes	3:20
6.	"Real Thing"	Johnson; Hollander; Katz	3:22
7.	"Someone like You"	Johnson	4:01
8.	"The Shot Heard 'Round the World"	Johnson	3:28
9.	"The First One"	Johnson; Howes	4:01
10.	"Chemicals Collide"	Johnson; Hollander; Katz	3:31
11.	"Go"	Johnson	6:09
Total length:			43:09

Japanese Edition Bonus Tracks
No.	Title	Length
12.	"Love Drunk" (acoustic version)	3:54
13.	"Love Drunk" (Mark Hoppus remix)	3:25

iTunes Bonus Tracks
No.	Title	Length
13.	"Heart Heart Heartbreak" (acoustic)	3:34
14.	"Love Drunk" (Mark Hoppus remix)	3:25
15.	"Making of "Love Drunk"" (video) (pre-order only)	1:55

== Personnel ==
Personnel per booklet.

Boys Like Girls

- Martin Johnson – lead vocals, guitar, background vocals (tracks 2, 4, 5 and 9)
- John Keefe – drums
- Bryan Donahue – bass
- Paul DiGiovanni – guitar

Additional musicians

- Brian Howes – additional guitars (tracks 2, 4, 5 and 9), keyboards (tracks 2, 4, 5 and 9), background vocals (tracks 2, 4, 5 and 9)
- Jay "JVP" Van Poederooyen – programming (tracks 2, 4, 5 and 9), keyboards (tracks 2, 4, 5 and 9), percussion (tracks 2, 4, 5 and 9)
- The Vancouver Mafia – background vocals (tracks 2, 4, 5 and 9)
- Vince Jones – piano (track 4)
- David Campbell – strings arranger (track 4), conductor (track 4)
- Joel Derouin – concertmaster (track 4)
- Charlie Bisharat – violins (track 4)
- Josefina Vergara – violins (track 4)
- Philip Vaiman – violins (track 4)
- Sara Parkins – violins (track 4)
- Julian Hallmark – violins (track 4)
- Mario Deleon – violins (track 4)
- Steve Richards – cellos (track 4)
- Rudy Stein – cellos (track 4)
- Chad Royce – additional keyboards (track 7), programming (track 7), strings arranger (track 11), strings engineer (track 11)
- Scott Mann – additional keyboards (track 7), programming (track 7), strings arranger (track 11), strings engineer (track 11)
- David Eggar – cello (track 11)
- Antoine Silverman – violin (track 11)

Production

- Brian Howes – producer (tracks 2, 4, 5 and 9)
- Jay "JVP" Van Poederooyen – engineer (tracks 2, 4, 5 and 9), digital editing (tracks 2, 4, 5 and 9)
- Bryan "Tatoo" Coisne – assistant (tracks 2, 4, 5 and 9)
- Misha Rajaratnam – additional editing (tracks 2, 4, 5 and 9)
- S*A*M and Sluggo – producer (tracks 1, 3, 6–8, 10 and 11)
- Martin Johnson – co-producer (tracks 1, 3, 6–8, 10 and 11)
- Sean Gould – engineer (tracks 1, 3, 6–8, 10 and 11)
- Grant Michaels – assistant (tracks 1, 3, 6–8, 10 and 11)
- Mike Caffrey – drum and bass engineering (tracks 1, 3, 6–8, 10 and 11)
- Mark Maxwell – additional production (tracks 1, 3, 6, 8 and 10)
- Tom Lord-Alge – mixing
- Femio Hernandez – assistant
- Vlado Meller – mastering

Design

- Dan Gillan – back cover
- Clay Patrick McBride – inside photo
- Invisible Creature – art direction
- Ryan Clark – design

== Charts ==
Chart performance for Love Drunk
Chart (2009)	Peak position
Australian Albums (ARIA)	95
Canadian Albums (Billboard)	11
Japan Top Album Sales (Billboard Japan)	45
UK Albums (OCC)	162
US Billboard 200	8
US Top Alternative Albums (Billboard)	1
US Top Rock Albums (Billboard)	1
