= Wake Up (Youngblood Hawke album) =

Studio album by Youngblood Hawke
- Released: April 23, 2013
- Recorded: 2011−2013
- Genre: Indie pop, indie rock, electropop
- Length: 45:15
- Label: Universal Republic Records

Youngblood Hawke chronology
Youngblood Hawke (EP) (2012)	Wake Up (2013)	Edge of the World (2020)

Singles from Wake Up
- 1. "We Come Running" Released: August 13, 2012; 2. "Stars (Hold On)" Released: 2013

Wake Up is the debut album by indie pop band Youngblood Hawke. It was released on April 23, 2013 exclusively on iTunes and then released to other digital retailers and stores on April 30, 2013.

== Background ==
On February 26, 2013, PureVolume posted an article containing tour and album information.

The album title was inspired by 22-year-old Danny McGuire, a friend of the band members. One day he was riding his bike home and was hit by a drunk driver, putting McGuire into a coma before dying. Youngblood Hawke wrote their song "Dannyboy" for him.

== Promotion and singles ==
"We Come Running" is the first single off of Wake Up, released online August 13, 2012 then on the EP the next day. The song has charted in many different countries, peaking at #7 on the US Alternative Songs chart (#46 on the year-end US Alternative Charts) and #17 on the main Australian music sales chart, as well as many others.

"Stars (Hold On)" was released as the second single off the album, accompanied by a music video. A remix EP was released to iTunes on September 24, 2013.

The original demo for "Dannyboy" was released as a promotional single on February 8, 2013 and the album version was made available for streaming on April 16, 2013. A music video was released on August 9, 2013 on Vevo.

== Critical reception ==
Wake Up was met with mixed reviews from critics. According to review aggregator Metacritic, the album received an average review score of 57/100, based on 9 reviews. Matt Collar of Allmusic gave the album 3.5 stars out of 5, calling it an "infectious, bombastic party album perfect for the summer months" filled with "dancey, often hummable melodic pop songs". Paul V. of Frontiers gave the album a positive review, saying "[Wake Up is] the kind of record you want to blare out of your car windows while breaking the speed limit on the freeway." Robert Johnson of Houston Music Review gave the album a positive review, saying "Wake Up is everything a great album should be. It's dynamic yet consistent, catchy yet complex, and extremely good." Mark Graham of VH1 reviewed Wake Up, comparing the band to Passion Pit and Walk the Moon and said, "[the album] is chock full of shimmery, upbeat, immensely positive tracks." Kevin Catchpole of Popmatters gave the album a 6/10 score, calling it "mostly satisfying" and saying that "style-studious feel permeating this album points out how it is both a great beginning and a bit derivative". Paul Mardles of The Observer, in a 3-star review, called the band "relentlessly chirpy and inclusive" but said "strip away the euphoria and there's not much going on". Harriet Gibsone of The Guardian echoed these sentiments in her two-star review, saying "Youngblood Hawke's debut rings loud with euphoria, but has little emotional impact."

== Track listing ==
Standard edition
No.	Title	Writer(s)	Producer(s)	Length
1.	"Rootless"	Samuel Martin, Simon Katz	Katz, Timmy Anderson	3:30
2.	"We Come Running"	Martin, Katz, Matt Squire	Squire, Katz	4:09
3.	"Dreams"	Martin, Katz, Luciana Caporaso, Nick Claw	Katz	3:34
4.	"Dannyboy"	Martin, Katz	Katz, Anderson	3:08
5.	"Stars (Hold On)"	Martin, Katz, Da Internz, Aaron Michael Cox	Da Internz, Cox, Katz	3:41
6.	"Glacier"	Martin, Katz	Katz, Anderson	3:36
7.	"Sleepless Streets"	Martin, Katz	Katz	2:49
8.	"Say Say"	Martin, Katz, Squire	Squire, Katz	4:52
9.	"Blackbeak"	Martin, Katz	Katz	4:01
10.	"Forever"	Martin, Katz	Katz, Anderson	3:34
11.	"Live & Die"	Martin, Katz, Dave Bassett	Katz	3:30
12.	"Last Time"	Martin, Katz, Squire	Squire, Katz	4:51
Total length:				45:15

iTunes edition
No.	Title	Writer(s)	Producer(s)	Length
13.	"In Our Blood"	Martin, Katz	Katz, Anderson	3:01
Total length:				48:16

Spotify edition
No.	Title	Length
13.	"Survival"	3:39
Total length:		48:54

- "We Come Running" and "Stars (Hold On)" feature vocals from the West Los Angeles Children's Choir.

== Release history ==
Region	Date	Label	Format
United States	April 23, 2013	Universal Republic Records	iTunes exclusive
United States	April 30, 2013	Universal Republic Records	Digital download, CD
Australia	May 3, 2013	Universal Republic Records	Digital download, CD

== Charts ==
Chart (2013)	Peak position
Australia (ARIA)	72
US Billboard 200	58
