= Martin Johnson (musician) =

American musician

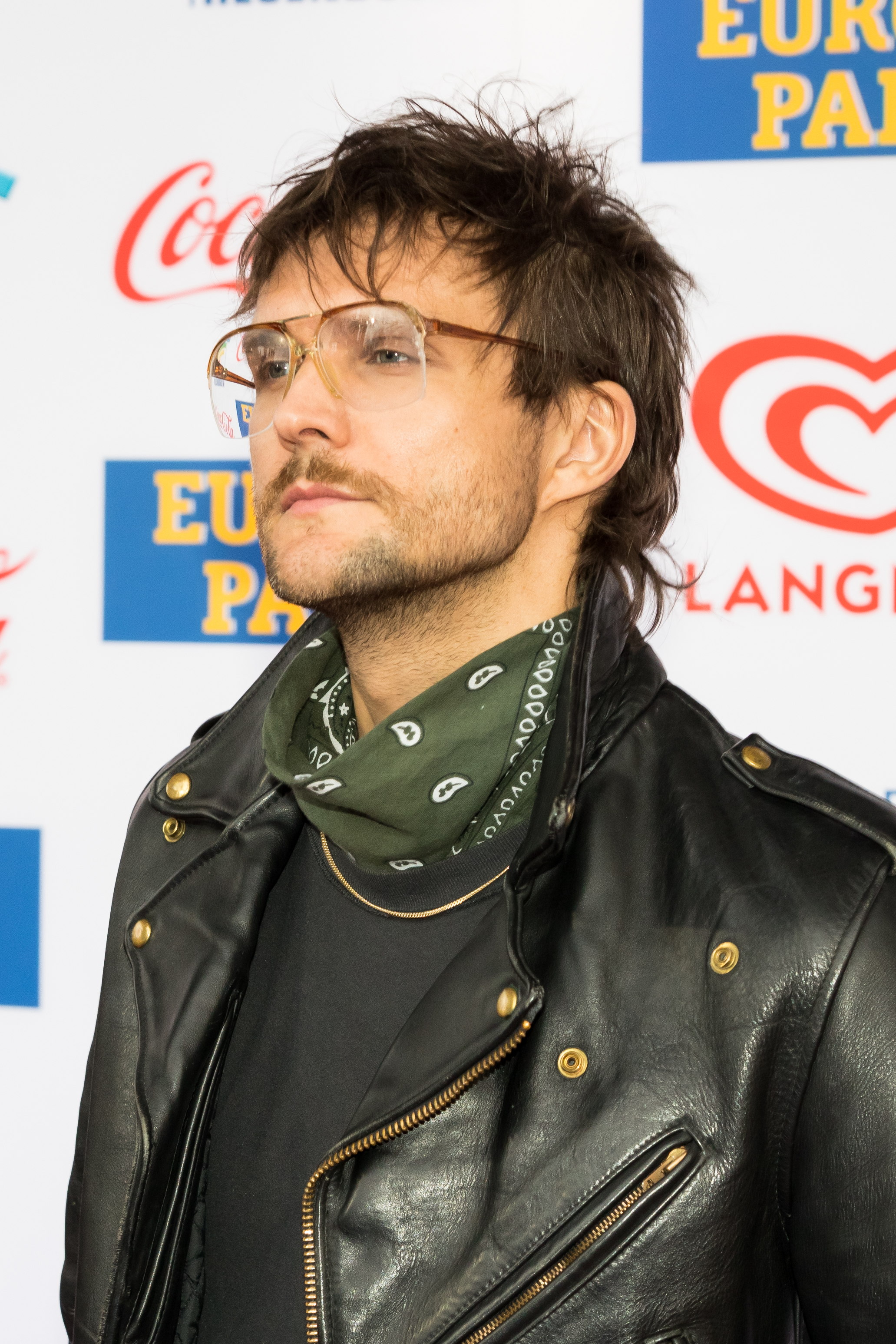
- Johnson in 2019

Background information
- Born: Martin Bennett Johnson; September 9, 1985 (age 40); Andover, Massachusetts, U.S.
- Genres: Alternative rock; pop-punk; pop rock; emo
- Occupations: Musician; singer; songwriter; record producer
- Instruments: Vocals; guitar; piano
- Years active: 2005–present
- Member of: Boys Like Girls; The Night Game
- Spouse: Naomi Cooke
- Website: martinjohnsonmusic.com

Martin Bennett Johnson (born September 9, 1985) is an American musician, singer, songwriter and record producer. He is the lead vocalist and rhythm guitarist of the bands Boys Like Girls and the Night Game.

He has written and produced for various artists, including Avril Lavigne, Daughtry, Jason Derulo, Christina Perri, Gavin Degraw, and Hot Chelle Rae. Johnson is credited with having several RIAA-certified multi-platinum songs ("The Other Side", "Here's to Never Growing Up", "Two Is Better Than One" (with Taylor Swift), "Love Drunk", "The Great Escape," "You'll Always Find Your Way Back Home").

== Early life ==
Martin Johnson was born in Andover, Massachusetts, on September 9, 1985, and raised in Amherst, Massachusetts. He is of English descent. Johnson attended Andover High School, where he began writing songs around that time. He also started playing guitar at the age of six and later played in a band called The Drive, as a drummer.. In both fourth and fifth grade, Johnson dressed up with his friends as The Beatles. Johnson was John Lennon, while his friend, Alex Toyoda, was Ringo Starr.

== Career ==
=== Boys Like Girls ===
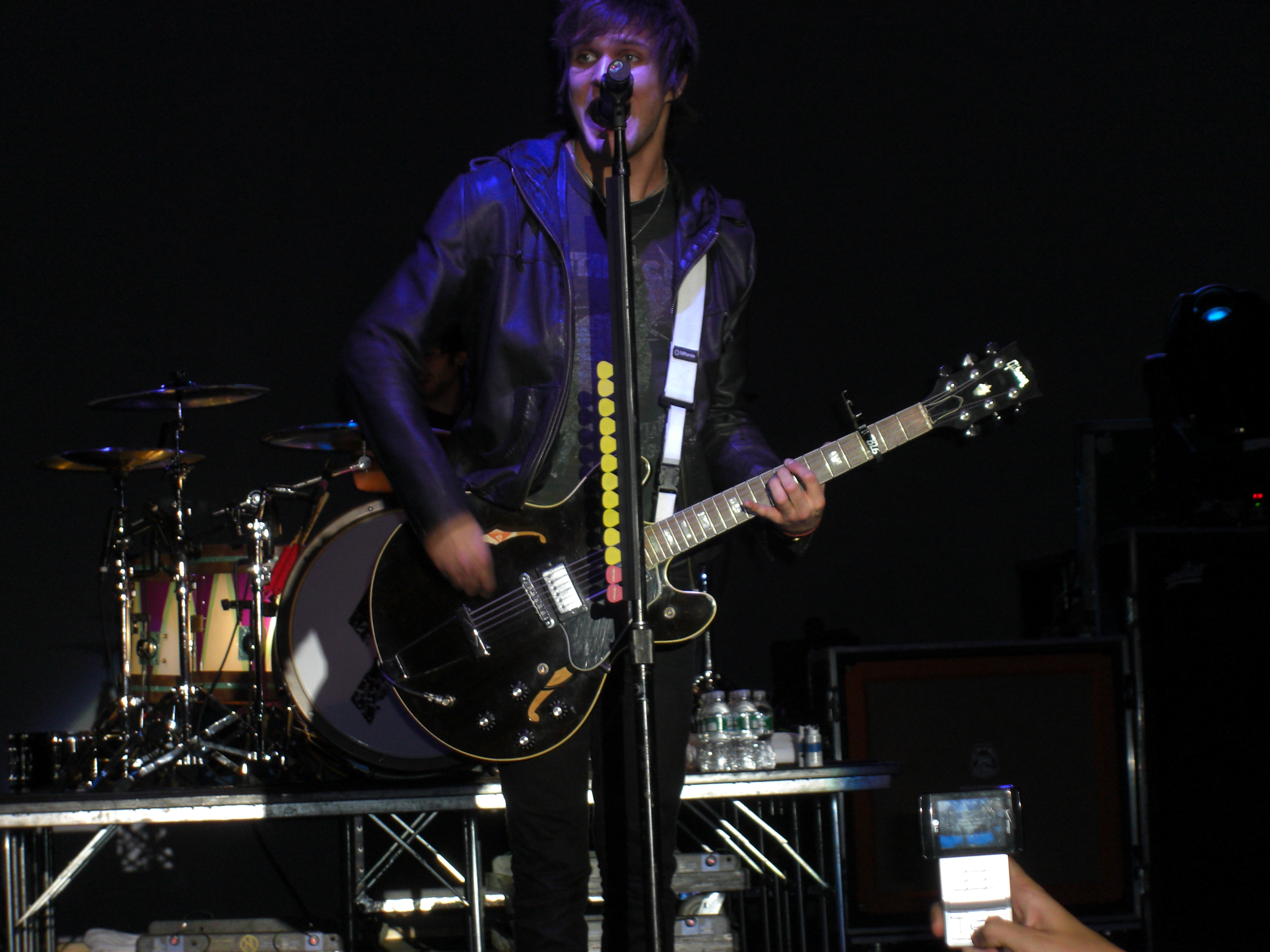
Johnson performing with Boys Like Girls

Johnson is the lead singer and plays guitar for the band Boys Like Girls. Johnson, along with drummer John Keefe and former bassist Bryan Donahue played together in various bands around Boston, before coming together to form Boys Like Girls in 2005. Keefe met guitarist Paul DiGiovanni while working on a demo for a mutual friend, and recruited him to the band to complete the line-up. Releasing their debut studio album Boys Like Girls in 2006, it was primarily written by Johnson, many of it is semi-autobiographical. Their second studio album Love Drunk was released in 2009. Johnson produced the band's third studio album Crazy World, released in 2012. The group then went on hiatus with Johnson saying the band hasn't broken up and may continue writing and recording. The band has since resumed recording and released their fourth studio album Sunday at Foxwoods in 2023.

Since releasing their debut album, the band has sold over a million albums and has accumulated over one hundred twenty million plays for their music on MySpace.

=== The Night Game ===
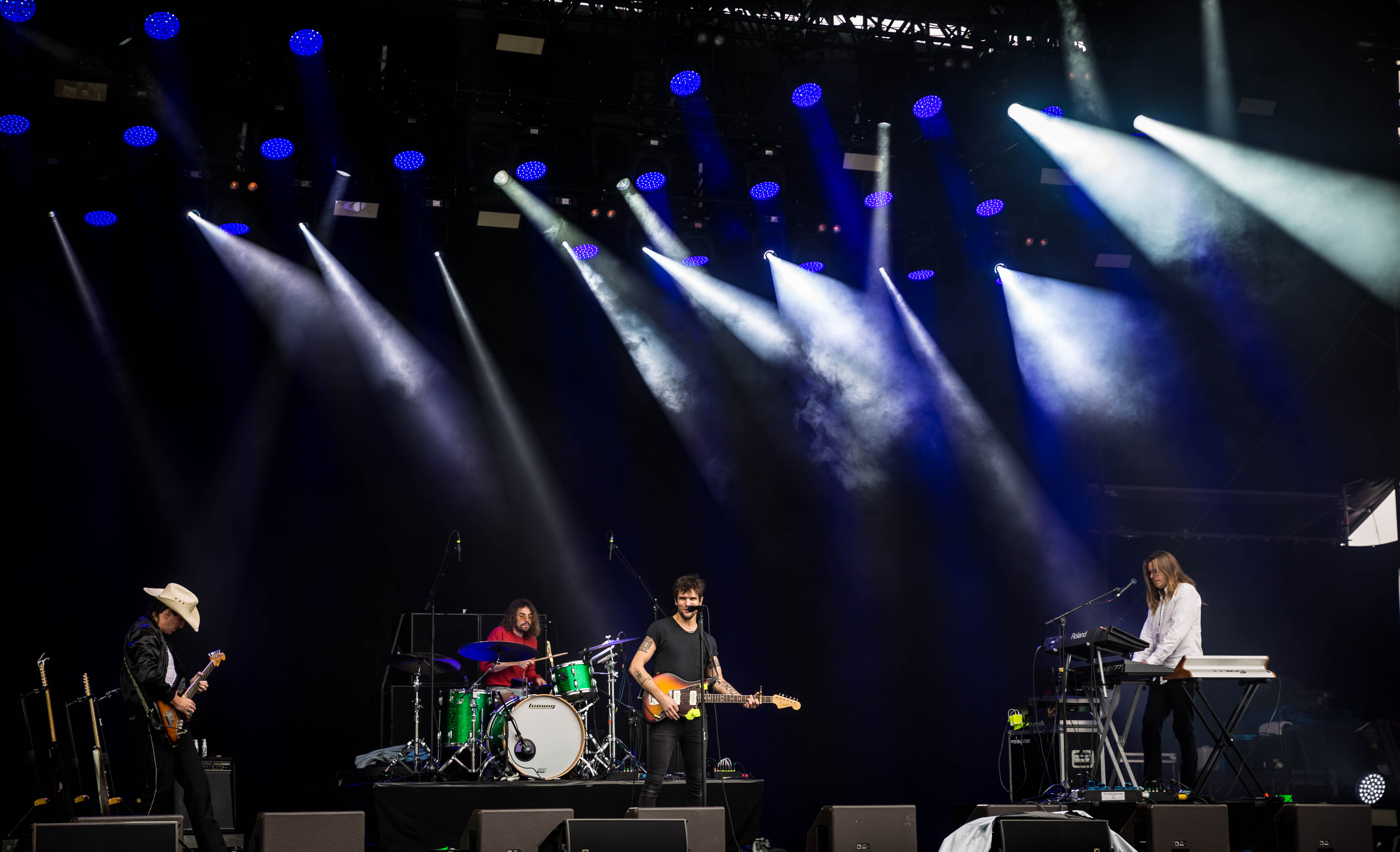
Johnson performing with The Night Game in 2018

Johnson formed the new wave band The Night Game, the name is based on a Paul Simon song. The band released two singles in 2017, "The Outfield" and "Once In A Lifetime", and toured as an opening act with John Mayer. They also collaborated with Kygo on the song "Kids in Love". On February 1, 2018, The Night Game released a version of "Kids in Love" without Kygo and announced their American Nights tour.

With the Night Game, he released two studio albums, The Night Game (2018) and Dog Years (2021).

=== Songwriting ===
Johnson co-wrote, with Taylor Swift, the song "You'll Always Find Your Way Back Home" from the Hannah Montana Movie soundtrack. He also co-wrote Ariana Grande's debut single "Put Your Hearts Up", as well as providing backing vocals. Most recently, Johnson produced and co-wrote Avril Lavigne's "Here's to Never Growing Up", Jason Derulo's "The Other Side", Karmin's "Acapella", Mike Posner's "The Way It Used To Be", Gavin Degraw's "Best I Ever Had", and Christina Perri's "Human". In 2015 he collaborated with a cappella group, Pentatonix.

== Personal life ==
He is married to singer-songwriter Naomi Cooke, formerly of the American country music group Runaway June. They have two daughters together.

Johnson previously resided in West Hollywood, California, and has lived in Hollywood Hills.

== Selected discography ==
Credits primarily adapted from AllMusic.

Year	Artist	Title	Album	Label	Role	Notes
2006	Boys Like Girls	"Hero/Heroine"	Boys Like Girls	Columbia	Writer	Debut single, No. 21 at Top 40, sole writer, RIAA-certified Gold
2006	Boys Like Girls	"The Great Escape"	Boys Like Girls	Columbia	Writer	Single, No. 8 at Top 40, RIAA-certified Platinum
2006	Boys Like Girls	"Thunder"	Boys Like Girls	Columbia	Writer	Single, No. 22 at Top 40, sole writer, RIAA-certified Gold
2009	Boys Like Girls	"Love Drunk"	Love Drunk	Columbia	Writer	Lead single, No. 7 at Top 40, RIAA-certified Platinum
2009	Boys Like Girls	"Two Is Better Than One" (feat. Taylor Swift)	Love Drunk	Columbia	Writer	Single, No. 4 at Top 40, RIAA-certified Platinum, sole writer
2009	Boys Like Girls	"Heart Heart Heartbreak"	Love Drunk	Columbia	Writer	No. 32 at Top 40
2009	Hannah Montana	"You'll Always Find Your Way Back Home"	Hannah Montana: The Movie	Walt Disney	Writer	RIAA-certified Platinum
2010	Taylor Swift	"If This Was A Movie"	Speak Now (Deluxe Package)	Big Machine	Writer	
2011	Ariana Grande	"Put Your Hearts Up"	Non-album single	Republic	Writer	Debut single
2011	Hot Chelle Rae	"Why Don't You Love Me" (feat. Demi Lovato)	Whatever	RCA	Writer	
2011	The Cab	"Bad"	Symphony Soldier	Z Entertainment, Universal Republic	Producer, writer	Lead Single
2012	Megan and Liz	"Bad for Me"	Bad for Me	Collective Sounds	Producer, writer	Debut single, Top 30 Mediabase (CHR)
2012	Papa Roach	"9th Life"	The Connection	Eleven Seven	Writer	Deluxe edition bonus track
2012	Allstar Weekend	"Life As We Know It"	The American Dream	Diggit	Writer	Single
2012	Boys Like Girls	"Be Your Everything"	Crazy World	Columbia	Producer, writer	Lead single
2012	Victoria Justice	"Make It in America"	Victorious 2.0	Nickelodeon / Sony / Columbia	Producer, writer	Single
2012	The Used	"Getting Over You"	Vulnerable	Hopeless	Writer	
2013	Christina Perri	"Human"	Head or Heart	Atlantic	Producer, writer	Lead single, RIAA-certified Platinum
2013	Daughtry	"Baptized"	Baptized	RCA	Producer, writer	
2013	Daughtry	"Waiting for Superman"	Baptized	RCA	Producer, writer	Lead single, RIAA-certified Platinum
2013	Daughtry	"Battleships"	Baptized	RCA	Producer, writer	Single
2013	Daughtry	"Wild Heart"	Baptized	RCA	Producer, writer	
2013	Daughtry	"Long Live Rock & Roll"	Baptized	RCA	Producer, writer	Promotional single
2013	Daughtry	"18 Years"	Baptized	RCA	Producer, writer	
2013	Gavin DeGraw	"Best I Ever Had"	Make a Move	RCA	Producer, writer	Lead single
2013	Gavin DeGraw	"Everything Will Change"	Make a Move	RCA	Producer, writer	
2013	Avril Lavigne	"Rock n Roll"	Avril Lavigne	Epic, Sony	Producer	Single
2013	Avril Lavigne	"Here's to Never Growing Up"	Avril Lavigne	Epic, Sony	Producer, writer	Lead single, RIAA-certified Platinum
2013	Avril Lavigne	"17"	Avril Lavigne	Epic, Sony	Producer, writer	
2013	Avril Lavigne	"Hello Kitty"	Avril Lavigne	Epic, Sony	Producer, writer	Single
2013	Avril Lavigne	"Sippin' on Sunshine"	Avril Lavigne	Epic, Sony	Producer, writer	
2013	Emblem 3	"Just for One Day"	Nothing to Lose	Columbia/SYCO	Producer, writer	
2013	Emblem 3	"I Love LA"	Nothing to Lose	Columbia/SYCO	Producer, writer	
2013	Mike Posner	"The Way It Used to Be"	Non-album single	RCA	Producer, writer	Single
2013	Karmin	"Acapella"	Pulses	Epic/Sony	Producer, writer	Lead single, RIAA-certified Gold
2013	Karmin	"Neon Love"	Pulses	Epic/Sony	Producer, writer	
2013	Jason Derulo	"The Other Side"	Tattoos and Talk Dirty	Warner Bros.		Lead single, RIAA-certified Platinum
2013	Escape The Fate	"Forget About Me"	Ungrateful	Eleven Seven	Writer	
2013	Escape The Fate	"One for the Money"	Ungrateful	Eleven Seven	Writer	
2013	Heaven's Basement	"Lights Out in London"	Filthy Empire	Red Bull	Writer	
2013	Heaven's Basement	"Welcome Home"	Filthy Empire	Red Bull	Writer	
2014	Mat Kearney	"One Black Sheep"	Just Kids	Columbia, Republic	Writer	
2014	Mat Kearney	"Billion"	Just Kids	Columbia, Republic	Writer	Single
2014	Olly Murs	"Beautiful to Me"	Never Been Better	Syco, Epic	Producer, writer	Single
2014	Betty Who	"Glory Days"	Take Me When You Go	RCA	Producer, writer	
2014	Betty Who	"A Night to Remember"	Take Me When You Go	RCA	Producer, writer	
2014	Betty Who	"Dreaming About You"	Take Me When You Go	RCA	Producer, writer	
2014	Gavin DeGraw	"You Got Me"	Finest Hour: The Best of Gavin DeGraw	RCA	Producer	Lead single
2014	Jacob Latimore	"Heartbreak Heard Around the World" (feat. T-Pain)	Non-album single	RCA	Producer, writer	Single
2014	Timeflies	"All We Got is Time"	After Hours	Island	Producer, writer	
2014	Alex and Sierra	"Scarecrow"	It's About Us	Columbia	Producer, writer	Debut single
2015	Pentatonix	"Sing"	Pentatonix	RCA	Producer, writer	
2015	Pentatonix	"New Year's Day"	Pentatonix	RCA	Producer, writer	
2015	Elle King	"America's Sweetheart"	Love Stuff	RCA	Producer, writer	Single
2015	Flo Rida	"Once in a Lifetime"	My House	Atlantic	Writer	
2016	Hunter Hayes	"Yesterday's Song"	Non-album single	Atlantic, Warner Music Nashville	Writer	Lead single
2016	Delta Goodrem	"Heavy"	Wings of the Wild	Sony Music Australia, HouseOfOZ	Producer, writer	Single
2017	Kygo	"Kids in Love"	Kids in Love	Sony Music, Ultra Records	Writer	Single
2021	Lady A	"Like a Lady"	What a Song Can Do	Big Machine	Writer	Single
2021	Elle King & Miranda Lambert	"Drunk (And I Don't Wanna Go Home)"	Non-album single	RCA	Producer, writer	Single
2023	Taylor Swift	"If This Was A Movie (Taylor's Version)"	Non-album single	Republic	Writer	Re-recorded song

In addition to the above-listed, Johnson (co-)wrote every track on the following Boys Like Girls albums: Boys Like Girls (2006), Love Drunk (2009), and Crazy World (2012).
