= The Great Escape (Boys Like Girls song) =

Single by Boys Like Girls

from the album Boys Like Girls
- Released: March 3, 2007
- Recorded: 2006
- Genre: Pop-punk; emo
- Length: 3:28
- Label: Columbia, Red Ink
- Songwriters: Martin Johnson; Sam Hollander; Dave Katz
- Producer: Matt Squire

Boys Like Girls singles chronology
"Hero/Heroine" (2006)	"The Great Escape" (2007)	"Thunder" (2008)

Music video
- "The Great Escape" on YouTube

"The Great Escape" is a song by American rock band Boys Like Girls. The song was released on March 3, 2007, as the second single from their debut studio album, Boys Like Girls. It became their first single to chart on the Billboard Hot 100, peaking at 23. The single has been certified platinum and gold by the RIAA.

== Background ==
According to the song's writer Martin Johnson in a lyric feature on Euphonia Online, the lyrical content of the song is about his graduating from high school.

This song is about leaving the town I grew up in with my best friends at my side. A graduation-type song with a 'we're up to no good, fuck this town, let's do it up for one more night' twist. I wrote it as a last hurrah to high school, growing up, and in a sense… the last night of being a kid. It's the end of one chapter… with an outlook on the future… sort of like a prequel to the rest of the record.

== Composition ==
"The Great Escape" was written by Martin Johnson, Sam Hollander and Dave Katz, while production was handled by Matt Squire. According to the sheet music published at Musicnotes.com, by Alfred Music Publishing, the track runs at 144 BPM and is in the key of E major. Johnson's range in the song spans from the notes B3 to B5. The song was written in 2004, and was written as a tribute to Johnson's senior year and "a goodbye letter" to his hometown. He described the track as "an outsider anthem."

== Chart performance ==
For the week ending June 2, 2007, "The Great Escape" debuted on the Billboard Hot 100 at number 96. The song peaked at number 23 on the chart in September 2007. The single sold 1.5 million copies and was certified platinum by the Recording Industry Association of America. The song also found commercial success in South Korea, peaking at number 86 on the International Singles Chart, as well as appearing on four year-end charts in the country from 2010 to 2013.

== Music video ==
The music video was directed by Alan Ferguson. It premiered on February 21, 2007, through Yahoo!, and was added to MTV playlists and received considerable airplay on those channels along with Fuse TV. The video was #1 on MTV's Total Request Live for 9 days in the summer and fall of 2007. It features the band on the road, as well as in concert, while detailing the journey of a group of their high school aged fans on the way to and during their best concert. It goes back and forth between the band and the high schoolers showing their journey as they both make their way to the concert the band will be playing at.

== Accolades ==
Accolades for "The Great Escape"
Publication	Country	Accolade	Year	Rank	Ref.
About.com	United States	Top 100 Songs of 2007	2007	33	
Alternative Press	United States	Best 100 Singles From the 2000s	2009	97	
Cleveland.com	United States	Top 100 Pop-punk Songs	2022	69	

== In popular culture ==
The song has also appeared as a downloadable track for the Xbox 360 karaoke game, Lips, and featured on the soundtrack of 2K Sports' Top Spin 3. The song is featured in the Nintendo DS version of the game by Activision, Band Hero and was made available as a downloadable track for the Rock Band game in June 2010. The song is featured on the soundtrack to the film The House Bunny. It was also used in promotion for the NBC show Life. The song was used in episode 64 and 154 of Running Man, and was used in episode 189 of Dream Team II. The song is also a playable level in the Nintendo Wii-exclusive video game We Cheer, We Cheer 2. The song has been the center of a popular rumor, claiming that it was among the pool of actual licensed songs included in the 2007 video game Cars Mater-National Championship, although, in reality, it does not, though both did coincidentally release in 2007.

== Track listing ==
Digital download
No.	Title	Length
1.	"The Great Escape"	3:26
2.	"Let Go" (AOL Music Sessions Under Cover)	4:17

Digital download – EP
No.	Title	Length
1.	"The Great Escape"	3:26
2.	"The Great Escape" (acoustic)	3:36
3.	"On Top of the World"	3:37

CD single
No.	Title	Length
1.	"The Great Escape"	3:26
2.	"Heels Over Head" (Tom Lord-Alge Mix)	3:08
3.	"The Great Escape" (live)

Notes

- The CD single features bonus content including a ringtone for "The Great Escape" and a wallpaper image.

== Personnel ==
Credits for "The Great Escape" adapted from album's liner notes.

Boys Like Girls

- Martin Johnson – lead vocals, rhythm guitar
- Paul DiGiovanni – lead guitar, backing vocals
- Bryan Donahue – bass guitar, backing vocals
- John Keefe – drums, percussion

Production

- Matt Squire – producer, engineer
- Tom Lord-Alge – mixing
- George Marino – mastering

== Charts ==
=== Weekly charts ===
Weekly chart performance for "The Great Escape"
Chart (2007–2010)	Peak position
Canada (Canadian Hot 100)	57
Canada CHR/Top 40 (Billboard)	14
Canada Hot AC (Billboard)	42
New Zealand (Recorded Music NZ)	36
Singapore Airplay (Mediacorp)	1
South Korea International Chart (GAON)	76
UK Singles (Official Charts)	72
US Billboard Hot 100	23
US Adult Pop Airplay (Billboard)	20
US Pop Airplay (Billboard)	8

=== Year-end charts ===
2007 year-end chart performance for "The Great Escape"
Chart (2007)	Position
Singapore Airplay (Mediacorp)	13
US Billboard Hot 100	77
US Hot Adult Contemporary (Radio & Records)	84

2010 year-end chart performance for "The Great Escape"
Chart (2010)	Position
South Korea International Singles (Gaon)	135

2011 year-end chart performance for "The Great Escape"
Chart (2011)	Position
South Korea International Singles (Gaon)	138

2012 year-end chart performance for "The Great Escape"
Chart (2012)	Position
South Korea International Singles (Gaon)	124

2013 year-end chart performance for "The Great Escape"
Chart (2013)	Position
South Korea International Singles (Gaon)	127

== Certifications ==
Region	Certification	Certified units/sales
New Zealand (RMNZ)	Gold	15,000^{‡}
United Kingdom (BPI)	Silver	200,000^{‡}
United States (RIAA)	Platinum	1,000,000^{*}
United States (RIAA) Mastertone	Gold	500,000^{*}
^{*} Sales figures based on certification alone.^{‡} Sales+streaming figures based on certification alone.

== Release history ==
Release history for "The Great Escape"
Country	Date	Format	Label	Ref.
United States	March 3, 2007	Contemporary hit radio	Columbia Records	
