= Love Drunk (Boys Like Girls song) =

Single by Boys Like Girls

from the album Love Drunk
- Released: June 30, 2009
- Recorded: 2008
- Genre: Pop-punk; pop rock
- Length: 3:47 (single version)
- Label: Sony Music
- Songwriters: Martin Johnson; Sam Hollander; Dave Katz
- Producer: Brian Howes

Boys Like Girls singles chronology
"Thunder" (2008)	"Love Drunk" (2009)	"Two Is Better Than One" (2009)

Music video
- "Love Drunk" on YouTube

"Love Drunk" is the lead single from American pop rock band Boys Like Girls' second studio album of the same name (2009). It is their second highest charting single to date, peaking at number 22 on the Billboard Hot 100. It was first released in the US on June 30, 2009, through Sony Music.

== Background and composition ==
The song premiered on Myspace and was released via iTunes on June 30, 2009. The single was sent to mainstream radio in the United States on July 7, 2009. Martin Johnson explained the song's meaning in an interview with MTV stating, "The song's obviously not about being in love. It's about giving the F.U. to a relationship and a situation. It's fun, it's celebrating skipping your way out gracefully with a nice flip of the bird, rather than crying your way home to mommy."

"Love Drunk" was written by Martin Johnson, Sam Hollander and Dave Katz, while production was handled by Brian Howes. According to the sheet music published at Musicnotes.com, by Alfred Music Publishing, the track runs at 150 BPM and is in the key of E flat major. Johnson's range in the song spans from the notes E♭4 to D6.

== Reception ==
Professional ratings
Review scores
Source	Rating
About.com	4.5/5 stars

"Love Drunk" gained mixed reviews on its release. Some critics enjoyed the track, including About.com's Top 40 Reviews, which claimed the song had "glorious" elements. Michael Menachem of Billboard stated, "from the bombastic opener to the cyborg drum roll on the bridge -- to make the song feel like an unstoppable hit even after it's finished." However, Jon Caramanica of The New York Times criticized the song's "brazen rip-off" to The Killers' single "Somebody Told Me", which features a chorus similar to the chorus from "Love Drunk".

== Chart performance ==
"Love Drunk" debuted at number 46 on the Billboard Hot 100 and peaked at number 22 the following week. In four weeks, the single sold 257,063 units, before it was certified platinum by the Recording Industry Association of America in December 2009.

== Music video ==
The music video began shooting in Los Angeles on June 29, 2009, and features actress and singer Ashley Tisdale. "Ashley was awesome – she played the lead girl," Martin Johnson says. "We did this faux arcade set-up with the band as [carnival] guys. She makes all the guys in the arcade fall for her and then it has a surprise ending."

The music video premiered on July 31, via MySpace before it aired on MTV on August 3. It was directed by Travis Kopach.

== Accolades ==
Accolades for "Love Drunk"
Publication	Country	Accolade	Year	Rank	Ref.
About.com	United States	Top 100 Songs of 2009	2009	31	
idobi Radio	United States	Top 50 Songs of 2009	2009	6	

== Personnel ==
Credits for "Love Drunk" adapted from album's liner notes.

Boys Like Girls

- Martin Johnson – lead vocals, guitar, background vocals
- John Keefe – drums
- Bryan Donahue – bass
- Paul DiGiovanni – guitar

Production

- Brian Howes – producer
- Jay "JVP" Van Poederooyen – engineer
- Tom Lord-Alge – mixing
- Vlado Meller – mastering

== Charts ==
=== Weekly charts ===
Weekly chart performance for "Love Drunk"
Chart (2009–2010)	Peak position
Australia (ARIA)	51
Canada Hot 100 (Billboard)	32
Germany Airplay (MusicTrace)	86
Japan (Japan Hot 100)	74
Mexico Ingles Airplay (Billboard)	44
New Zealand (Recorded Music NZ)	24
Scottish Singles Sales (Official Charts)	33
Singapore Airplay (Mediacorp)	4
UK Singles (Official Charts)	44
US Billboard Hot 100	22
US Adult Pop Airplay (Billboard)	35
US Pop Airplay (Billboard)	8

=== Year-end charts ===
2009 year-end chart performance for "Love Drunk"
Chart (2009)	Position
US Billboard Hot 100	72

2011 year-end chart performance for "Love Drunk"
Chart (2011)	Position
Brazil Airplay (Crowley)	99

== Certifications ==
Certifications and sales for "Love Drunk"
Region	Certification	Certified units/sales
Canada (Music Canada)	Gold	40,000^{*}
New Zealand (RMNZ)	Gold	15,000^{‡}
United Kingdom (BPI)	Silver	200,000^{‡}
United States (RIAA)	Platinum	1,000,000^{*}
^{*} Sales figures based on certification alone.^{‡} Sales+streaming figures based on certification alone.

== Release history ==
Release dates and formats for "Love Drunk"
Region	Date	Format	Label(s)	Ref.
United States	July 6, 2009	Mainstream airplay	Columbia	
