= Boys Like Girls =

American rock band

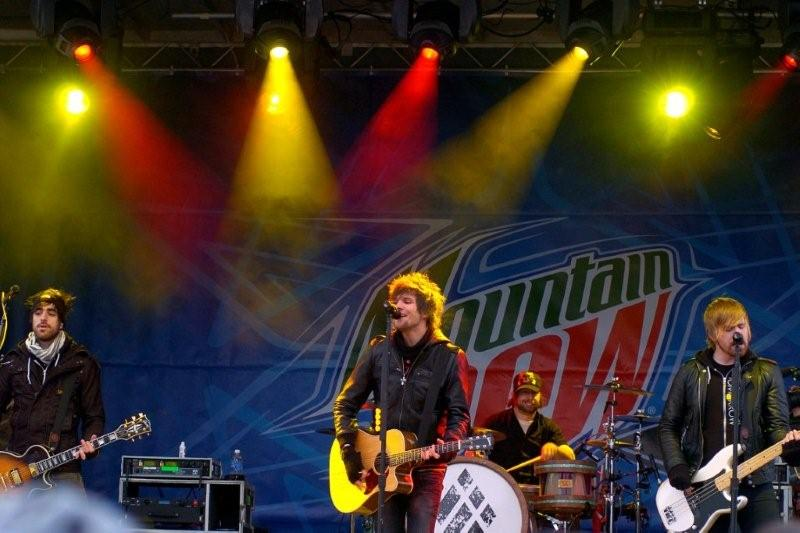
- Boys Like Girls performing in 2009

Background information
- Origin: Andover, Massachusetts, U.S.
- Genres: Alternative rock; pop-punk; pop rock; emo pop
- Years active: 2005–present
- Labels: Sony Music/Columbia; Red Ink; Fearless
- Members: Martin Johnson; John Keefe; Gregory James; Jamel Hawke
- Past members: Bryan Donahue; Paul DiGiovanni; Morgan Dorr
- Website: boyslikegirls.com

Boys Like Girls (stylized in all caps since 2023) is an American rock band formed in Andover, Massachusetts, in 2005. The group gained mainstream recognition with their self-titled debut album (2006), which went on to sell over 700,000 albums in the US, and received a gold certification from the RIAA. The band's second studio album Love Drunk, was released in 2009 and their third studio album Crazy World, was released in 2012.

The band toured worldwide between 2006 and 2013. Notable tours include their main stage appearance on the 2007 Vans Warped Tour, their first headlining tour "Tourzilla" (2007) and a co-headliner with Good Charlotte for the Soundtrack of Your Summer Tour 2008.

The music video for their single "The Great Escape" was voted the number 1 video on MTV's Total Request Live on August 6, 2007, and the band performed at MTV's TRL studio overlooking Times Square. In 2023, the band released the single "Blood and Sugar" from their fourth studio album Sunday at Foxwoods.

== History ==
=== Formation and early years (2005–2006) ===
The group was formed in Boston suburb Andover, Massachusetts in the final months of 2005, when vocalist Martin Johnson, formerly of the Boston act Fake ID/The Drive, wrote several songs he wanted to record. He recruited bassist Bryan Donahue and drummer John Keefe, whom the latter was in the band Strutter with Johnson when they were in high school. Lead guitarist Paul DiGiovanni was the last member to join, completing the line-up. Some months later Keefe and DiGiovanni learned that they were distant cousins. The group originally performed under the name Lancaster, before renaming as Boys Like Girls.

The quartet uploaded music to their PureVolume and Myspace page, posting several demo recordings. By the end of the year, the group was on the number 1 spot on the website's Top Unsigned Artists chart and within a few months had completed nationwide tours with Cute Is What We Aim For, Hit the Lights, All Time Low and Butch Walker.

Eventually, in 2006, the popularity of the band was overheard by talent agent Matt Galle and record producer Matt Squire, who contacted the band about a future collaboration. With their full support, Boys Like Girls embarked on their first nationwide tour with A Thorn for Every Heart, Hit the Lights and Keating in late February 2006. Following the month-long venture, the group immediately entered the recording studio with Squire to record their debut album for Columbia Records/Red Ink.

During their time in the studio Squire introduced the band to another of his alumni, Cute Is What We Aim For, who offered Boys Like Girls an opening slot on their then-upcoming headlining tour. Once the album was recorded, Boys Like Girls played on two tours, including the Cute Is What We Aim For tour in June, as well as a two-week stint with Butch Walker in late July. In between tours the band filmed their first music video for their album's lead single, "Hero/Heroine", directed by Mark Serao and Chris Vaglio of Grey Sky Films.

=== Boys Like Girls (2006–2009) ===
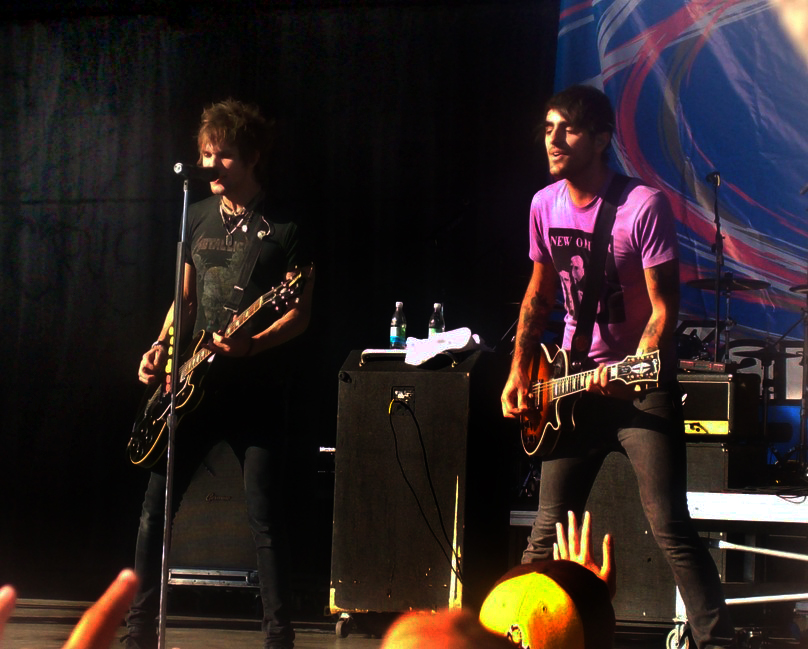
Boys Like Girls performing in Kansas City

On August 22, 2006, their debut studio album Boys Like Girls was released. Debuting on the Billboard 200 at number 179, the album sold less than 1,500 copies in its first week. The album peaked at number 55 on the Billboard 200. By June 2009, the album had sold over 700,000 copies in the United States and is certified gold by the Recording Industry Association of America. While, as the title might suggest, songs about boys liking girls clearly prevail on the album, Johnson occasionally touched upon themes such as his mother's battle with cancer, leaving home, and promiscuous adolescents, with songs concerning these topics such as "Dance Hall Drug" and "On Top of the World". "Hero/Heroine" was released on October 16, 2006, and peaked at number 43 on the Billboard Hot 100. The song was certified gold by the RIAA. The band went on tour with Spitalfield, Punchline, Valencia and Over It in November and December.

In 2007, they began with a short headlining run with Self Against City, after which the group joined Cobra Starship supporting a two-month Cartel tour in February. They performed "The Great Escape" on Jimmy Kimmel Live! on February 22, 2007, and eventually was released as the album's second single on March 3. The song peaked at number 23 on the Billboard Hot 100 and was certified platinum by the RIAA. Boys Like Girls played their first international concerts during the Canada leg of Hellogoodbye's Two Months of Spring Break Tour and the UK festival Give It A Name 2007. They also appeared on The Bamboozle festival. From late June to late August, the group performed on the annual Vans Warped Tour. On July 31, the band's single "The Great Escape" reached the number 1 spot on the MTV show Total Request Live. They embarked on their headlining Tourzilla tour from September to November. In September 2007, Boys Like Girls released a three-song acoustic set for AOL's Sessions Under Cover as an EP in the iTunes Store, containing "The Great Escape", "Thunder" and a cover of Frou Frou's "Let Go".

"Thunder" was released as the third and final single from the album on May 6, 2008. The song peaked at number 76 on the Billboard Hot 100 and was certified gold by the RIAA. Boys Like Girls played at the Slam Dunk Festival on the Glamour Kills stage, in Leeds, on May 25, 2008. The band was also the opening act for Avril Lavigne's 2008 Best Damn Tour throughout the majority of North America. From July to August, Boys Like Girls toured with Good Charlotte, The Maine, and Metro Station, for the Soundtrack of Your Summer Tour. The band also performed at various Six Flags locations as part of the mtvU Video Music Awards Tour. In September and October, the band went on the Verizon College tour with Cute Is What We Aim For and Lights. In between tour dates, they worked alongside iCarly actress and singer Miranda Cosgrove on her About You Now EP, released in 2009.

Boys Like Girls supported Fall Out Boy on their UK tour in October, along with You Me at Six. A month later the band's debut DVD, Read Between the Lines, was released on November 4, 2008. The DVD peaked at number 20 on the Billboard Music Videos chart. In January 2009, Boys Like Girls toured the UK with Metro Station and Every Avenue supporting.

=== Love Drunk (2009–2010) ===
Johnson announced on his website that the band had begun to record their new album on February 10, 2009. It was recorded half in Vancouver and half in New York City, where it was produced by Brian Howes and S*A*M and Sluggo. Drawing "influences from all across the board, from every type of music," the band wrote nearly 80 tracks for the album. On June 18, Boys Like Girls confirmed the title for their second album would be Love Drunk. On June 30, the band released their first single, the title track of the album. The music video features actress and singer Ashley Tisdale, which premiered in August, via MTV. The song peaked at number 22 on the Billboard Hot 100 and was certified platinum by the RIAA. In August 2009, the band performed at the Summer Sonic Festival in Japan. On August 15, they were featured alongside The All-American Rejects, Hoobastank, Raygun, Kasabian, Pixie Lott and Misha Omar as one of the live acts at Asia's first MTV World Stage Live concert that was held in Malaysia. In promotion of the album, the group released a digital-only single, "She's Got a Boyfriend Now" on August 11, and premiered "Heart Heart Heartbreak" through PureVolume on August 17. The album was officially released on September 8. In its first week, it sold more than 40,000 copies, landing it on the number eight spot on the Billboard 200. The band embarked on the OP Tour with Cobra Starship, A Rocket to the Moon, The Maine, and VersaEmerge in October 2009.

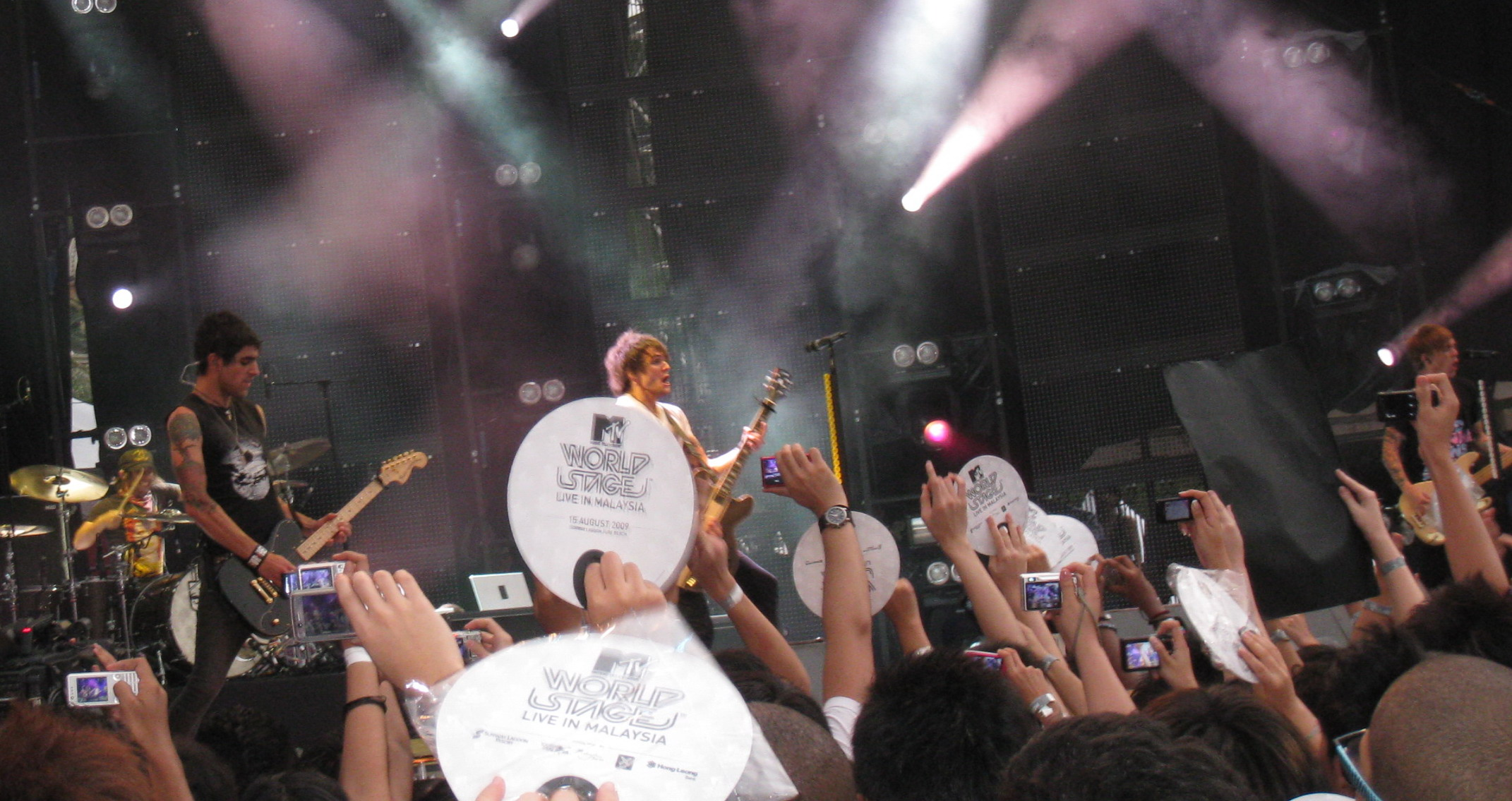
Boys Like Girls performing at MTV World Stage Live in Malaysia

"Two Is Better Than One" was released on contemporary hit radio on October 19, as the album's second single, featuring and written with Taylor Swift. The song is about Johnson's previous relationship with a longtime girlfriend. It reached number 18 on the Billboard Hot 100. Selling 1.7 million copies in the United States, the song was certified platinum by the RIAA. Johnson had previously worked with Swift to write the song "You'll Always Find Your Way Back Home", which is featured in Hannah Montana: The Movie.

When the album was released, it became available for purchase on iTunes, Amazon, as well as many major retailers around the country on iTunes, a "Deluxe Version" of the album was also released, which contains three bonus tracks; "Love Drunk (Acoustic)", "Heart Heart Heartbreak (Acoustic)" and a Mark Hoppus remixed version of "Love Drunk".

In March 2010, Boys Like Girls supported Hedley along with Stereos and FeFe Dobson on select dates across Canada. "Heart Heart Heartbreak" was released as the third and final single on April 13. Boys Like Girls co-headlined The Bamboozle Roadshow 2010 between May and June 2010. All Time Low, Third Eye Blind, and LMFAO co-headlined with Boys Like Girls. Along with numerous other supporting bands, including 3OH!3, Good Charlotte, Forever the Sickest Kids, Cartel, and Simple Plan. Martin Johnson and Paul DiGiovanni had a small cameo in Good Charlotte's "Like It's Her Birthday" music video, along with The Maine's John O'Callaghan and Kennedy Brock.

In May 2010, Boys Like Girls participated in the Ultimate Prom contest sponsored by Seventeen Magazine. Bremen High School in Bremen, Indiana, was the winning school, and the band performed at the school's May 8 Senior Prom. Bremen senior Alicia Cauffman submitted the winning entry, a video submission detailing the town's "economic hardship and school spirit."

=== Departure of Bryan Donahue and Crazy World (2010–2013) ===
The group began working on their third studio album in 2010. However, it was canceled after they felt that the album was "disingenuous." According to Johnson, the album originally leaned into an electropop hybrid sound and "didn't really feel like Boys Like Girls."

In early 2011, rumors started spreading that Boys Like Girls had disbanded. Drummer John Keefe quickly denied these rumors. However, the band's members began working on individual projects. Johnson moved to Nashville, Tennessee, writing with other musicians and creating demos. Bassist Donahue continued focusing with his side project Early Morning Blues, along with guitarist Paul DiGiovanni. Donahue released the debut EP, Newest Version on December 26, 2010. DiGiovanni has also opened his own clothing range named "Black Carbon Custom" which he runs himself. Keefe began collaborating with the Rebels, a Boston-based band.

After writing 300 songs, Johnson believed a "Boys Like Girls album was hiding in there somewhere" and sent the members about 24 tracks. In the fall of 2011, the band reunited at Johnson's home in Los Angeles and used his demos to begin reworking on their third album. They decided to focus on diving into a pop rock and country music sound. On November 19, 2011, the group posted a video announcing they were recording the album. However, the band's bassist Bryan Donahue unwillingly left the band. Reasons told were that Donahue had too many plans disrupting the band's progress and was apparently too "engrossed" in his other solo projects, Early Morning Blues and The Tower and the Fool. Morgan Dorr was announced as Donahue's replacement.

The group began recording the album in December 2011, posting studio updates. In May 2012, the band revealed the album's title, Crazy World. On July 17, they released the Crazy World EP, containing three songs off the then-upcoming full-length album. The three songs are "Be Your Everything", "Life of the Party" and "The First Time". In support of the EP's release, they embarked on the Crazy Good Summer Concert Series with Carly Rae Jepsen on July 19. On August 14, the album's lead single "Be Your Everything" was released along with its music video. In September 2012, the band embarked a U.S. Tour in New Hampshire headlining with The All American Rejects which also featured supporting bands such as Parachute and The Ready Set. On November 4, the band released the album's second single "Life of the Party". On November 8, the album's tracklist was revealed. On November 16, the band premiered the song "Stuck in the Middle", and the LP was made available for pre-order. Days prior to the release of Crazy World, the band released "Leaving California" and "Hey You" for streaming on SoundCloud. The album was officially released on December 11, 2012. The album reached number 134 on the Billboard 200.

=== Hiatus, side-projects and returning tours (2013–2022) ===
Following inactivity from the group following the release of Crazy World, Keefe and Dorr collaborated on a side project called Best of Friends and embarked on A Very Merry Christmas Acoustic Tour in December 2013. DiGiovanni has been occasionally involved in the genre of country music. He co-wrote Dan + Shay's single "How Not To", which reached number 1 on Country Airplay in 2017, and produced Home State, the debut album of singer Jordan Davis.

In May 2016, the band teased a ten-year anniversary special for the self-titled album, posting the number "ten" via social media. In August, the band embarked on a tour to celebrate the album.

In 2017, frontman Martin Johnson released the first single for his solo indie pop project, The Night Game. Since then, he has released two full-length albums, The Night Game (2018) and Dog Years (2021). In a 2017 interview with New York City Monthly about his project, Johnson stated the band may continue writing and recording, while also denying claims about the band's disbandment.

In November 2019, a tour was announced to be held in April 2020 at several Australian locations: Perth, Adelaide, Melbourne, Sydney, and Brisbane. Their self-titled debut album was to be played live in its entirety. In January 2020, fellow American rock band The Red Jumpsuit Apparatus was announced to be joining their tour. Shows were also announced for the Philippines set for April 2020. However, in March, the tour dates were postponed to September 2020, shortly after the COVID-19 outbreak was declared a pandemic by the World Health Organization.

In October 2022, the group embarked on a Southeast Asia tour, headlining shows in Thailand and the Philippines. They also performed at the 2022 When We Were Young Festival that month.

=== Sunday at Foxwoods (2023–present) ===
The group began working on their fourth studio album shortly before the COVID-19 pandemic, when Johnson was asked by Keefe and DiGiovanni if he wanted to make another album. During the process of creating the album, DiGiovanni and Dorr were both replaced by guitarist Jamel Hawke and bassist Gregory James. It was recorded in Johnson's studio in Nashville, Tennessee, and the title of the album Sunday at Foxwoods came from the area of Boston they grew up in.

On May 19, 2023, the band released the single "Blood and Sugar" as the lead single from the album. The album's second single, "Language" was released on June 23. The band released "The Outside" on July 28, as the album's third single. "Cry" was released as the album's fourth single on August 25. The fifth and final single, "New Love" was released on September 22. In support of the album, the group embarked on the Speaking Our Language Tour from September to November 2023, with support from State Champs on all dates, as well as Four Year Strong, 3OH!3, LØLØ, the Summer Set, the Ready Set, and Max Bemis on select dates. On October 6, the group released a collaborative version of "The Outside", featuring 3OH!3, State Champs, the Summer Set and the Ready Set. The album was released on October 20, 2023, through Fearless Records.

In November 2023, the band was featured on the track "I Can't Stop Me" on K-pop girl group Twice's album "The Remixes".

The group embarked on a Southeast Asia tour in the spring of 2024, as well as joining Dashboard Confessional on tour in the United States in May. They also toured with Grayscale on a summer tour in July 2024. The group collaborated with Said the Sky and released the single "Hold My Breath". In December 2024, it was announced that Boys Like Girls would be performing at Playback Music Festival in Manila on May 8, 2025, joining The Click Five and Secondhand Serenade. The group supported the Jonas Brothers on their Jonas20: Greetings from Your Hometown Tour in August 2025.

== Musical style and influences ==
Stylistically, the band lists its musical influences as a variety of contemporary band in genres such as punk, emo pop, and alternative rock, such as Jimmy Eat World, Blink-182, Secondhand Serenade, Relient K, The Academy Is..., and Dashboard Confessional. The punk rock influence is most evident in their guitar and drums style. Given Johnson's characteristic tenor vocal melodies, the band's all-around sound is more closely compared to 1990s alternative radio rock, along the lines of Vertical Horizon, Goo Goo Dolls, and Eve 6.

== Band members ==
=== Current ===
- Martin Johnson – lead vocals, rhythm guitar (2005–present)
- John Keefe – drums, percussion (2005–present)
- Gregory James – bass guitar, backing vocals (2021–present)
- Jamel Hawke – lead guitar, backing vocals (2023–present)

=== Former ===
- Bryan Donahue – bass guitar, backing vocals (2005–2011)
- Paul DiGiovanni – lead guitar, backing vocals (2005–2022)
- Morgan Dorr – bass guitar, backing vocals (2011–2021)

== Discography ==
- Boys Like Girls (2006)
- Love Drunk (2009)
- Crazy World (2012)
- Sunday at Foxwoods (2023)

== Awards and nominations ==
Year	Association	Category	Nominated work	Result	Ref.
2007	mtvU Woodie Awards	Breaking Woodie	Boys Like Girls	Won	
2007	Spin	Artist of the Year	Boys Like Girls	Won	
2008	Kids' Choice Awards	Favorite Music Group	Boys Like Girls	Nominated	
2008	Teen Choice Awards	Choice Music: Rock Group	Boys Like Girls	Nominated	
2008	Teen Choice Awards	Choice Music: Rock Track	"The Great Escape"	Nominated	
2011	BMI Awards	Award-Winning Songs	"Two Is Better Than One"	Won	
2011	BMI Awards	Publisher of the Year	"Two Is Better Than One"	Won	
