= Hero/Heroine =

Single by Boys Like Girls

from the album Boys Like Girls
- Released: October 16, 2006
- Recorded: 2006
- Genre: Alternative rock; pop-punk; emo
- Length: 3:52 (album version)
- Label: Columbia, Red Ink
- Songwriter(s): Martin Johnson
- Producer(s): Matt Squire

Boys Like Girls singles chronology
"Hero/Heroine" (2006)	"The Great Escape" (2007)

Music video
- "Hero/Heroine" on YouTube

"Hero/Heroine" is the debut single by Boys Like Girls, from their self-titled debut studio album. The single was originally released in October 2006 along with a music video, but it did not chart in its initial run at radio.

However, following the success of "The Great Escape", the band decided to re-release the song and premiered a new video for it on MTV's TRL in November 2007. The song was certified gold by the RIAA in January 2009, and has sold over 900,000 copies.

== Background ==
The song is described by Johnson as the "serious side of 'Five Minutes to Midnight'", another track off their debut studio album. He stated that the song is about "how fast life can turn around, and how someone just being there can save you."

== Composition ==
"Hero/Heroine" was written by Martin Johnson and produced by Matt Squire. According to the sheet music published at Musicnotes.com, by Alfred Music Publishing, the track runs at 164 BPM and is in the key of C major. Johnson's range in the song spans from the notes G4 to C6.

== Music video ==
There are two music video versions for the single "Hero/Heroine". The first video was released onto YouTube on August 9, 2006, and features the band performing in a room, while a robbery at a restaurant is taking place. Directed by Chris Vaglio and Mark Serao, the video later premiered on MTV on October 20. In the second video, shot in September 2007 and directed by Chris Applebaum, Martin is seen walking around Boston with his girlfriend (played by Autumn Holley) and the rest of the band is seen in other scenes. During the end of the video, the band is seen performing in front of fans. It was released on November 6, 2007.

== Personnel ==
Credits for "Hero/Heroine" adapted from album's liner notes.

Boys Like Girls

- Martin Johnson – lead vocals, rhythm guitar
- Paul DiGiovanni – lead guitar, backing vocals
- Bryan Donahue – bass guitar, backing vocals
- John Keefe – drums, percussion

Production

- Matt Squire – producer, engineer, mixing
- Tom Lord-Alge – mixing
- George Marino – mastering

== Charts ==
=== Weekly charts ===
Weekly chart performance for "Hero/Heroine"
Chart (2007–08)	Peak position
Singapore Airplay (Mediacorp)	3
US Billboard Hot 100	43
US Pop Airplay (Billboard)	22

=== Year-end charts ===
Year-end chart performance for "Hero/Heroine"
Chart (2008)	Position
Singapore Airplay (Mediacorp)	37

== Certifications ==
Region	Certification	Certified units/sales
United States (RIAA)	Gold	500,000^{*}
^{*} Sales figures based on certification alone.

== In popular culture ==
The song was featured in the Nickelodeon TV film Spectacular!, and also in the reality show A Double Shot at Love. It is also briefly visible playing on a TV screen in the 2009 film The Taking of Pelham 123.
