= Dave Katz (songwriter) =

American songwriter and record producer (born 1965)

- Also known as: Sluggo
- Born: David Anthony Katz; March 8, 1965 (age 60); New York City, New York, U.S.
- Origin: New York City, New York, U.S.
- Genres: Pop, pop rock, dance-pop, electropop, hip pop
- Occupation(s): Songwriter, record producer, musician
- Instrument(s): Guitar, piano, vocals
- Years active: 1992–present

David Anthony Katz (born March 8, 1965) is an American songwriter and record producer. He has written and/or produced for artists including Train, Boys Like Girls, Gym Class Heroes, Good Charlotte, Mandy Moore, Neon Trees, Cobra Starship, 3OH!3, Coheed and Cambria, All Time Low, Metro Station, We The Kings, Uncle Kracker, Sugar Ray, Matisyahu, Blues Traveler, Tom Jones, Hot Chelle Rae, David Cook, Big Time Rush, Chiddy Bang, Kelly Rowland, Arrested Development, and Hollywood Undead, among others.

== Early years ==
Katz graduated from New Lincoln High School in Manhattan. His first records as a songwriter were for Roger Daltrey's Rocks in the Head album in the early 1990s. In 1999, Katz co-wrote "Candy" for Mandy Moore, which was a top-40 hit and went to No. 1 on MTV's TRL.

== Current ==
Katz has written and/or produced 24 US Top 40 Pop Hits, and in 2008 was named the 2008 Rolling Stone Hot List Producer of the Year.

== Selected discography ==
- Train "Save Me San Francisco"/"Marry Me" (Columbia) (co-write)
- Gym Class Heroes "As Cruel as School Children" (Decaydance/Fueled By Ramen) (co-write/produce)
- Gym Class Heroes "Cupid's Chokehold" (Decaydance/Fueled By Ramen) (produce)
- Matisyahu "Shine On" (co-write)
- Kelly Rowland "Daylight" (Columbia) (produce)
- Cobra Starship "Bring It (Snakes on a Plane)" (Decaydance/New Line) (co-write/produce for the movie and soundtrack Snakes on a Plane)
- Cobra Starship "While the City Sleeps, We Rule the Streets" (Decaydance/Fueled By Ramen) (co-write/produce)
- Metro Station "Shake It" (Red Ink/Columbia) (produce)
- We The Kings "Check Yes Juliet"/"Heaven Can Wait"/"Secret Valentine"/"We'll Be A Dream" / "Say You Like Me" (S-Curve/EMI) (co-write/produce)
- The Academy Is... "Fast Times at Barrington High" (Fueled By Ramen) (co-write/produce)
- Blake Lewis "Heartbreak on Vinyl"/"How Many Words"/"Here's My Hello" (RCA/Tommy Boy) (co-write/produce)
- Hey Monday "Hold On Tight" (Decaydance/Columbia) (co-write/produce)
- The Virgins "The Virgins" (Atlantic) (produce)
- All Time Low "Lost in Stereo"/"Holly (Would You Turn Me On)" (Hopeless) (co-write/produce)
- Boys Like Girls "The Great Escape"/ "Love Drunk"/"Five Minutes To Midnight"/"Learning To Fall" (Columbia) (co-write)
- Charlotte Sometimes "Waves and the Both of Us" (Geffen) (co-write/produce)
- David Archuleta "Something 'Bout Love" (Jive Records) (co-write/produce)
- 3OH!3 "Hit It Again" (Atlantic)/(Photo Finish Records) (co-write/produce)
- Hollywood Undead "Hear Me Now"/"My Town" (produce)
- Yungblud "Medication" "Doctor Doctor" "Die For The Hype" ([Interscope Records]) (co-write/produce)
- Bleeker "James Dean" "Give A Little Bit More (Disaster) ([Better Noise Music]) co-write/produce
- Violent Femmes "Holy Ghost" "Foothills" co-write
- Just Loud "Electrified" "Soul Train (Feat Debbie Harry of Blondie)" co-write/produce
- Mike Posner Silence" (Island Records) Remix
- Loote "Longer Than I Thought Feat. Joe Jonas" (Island Records) co-write/produce
