= This Century discography =

American pop rock band from Phoenix, Arizona

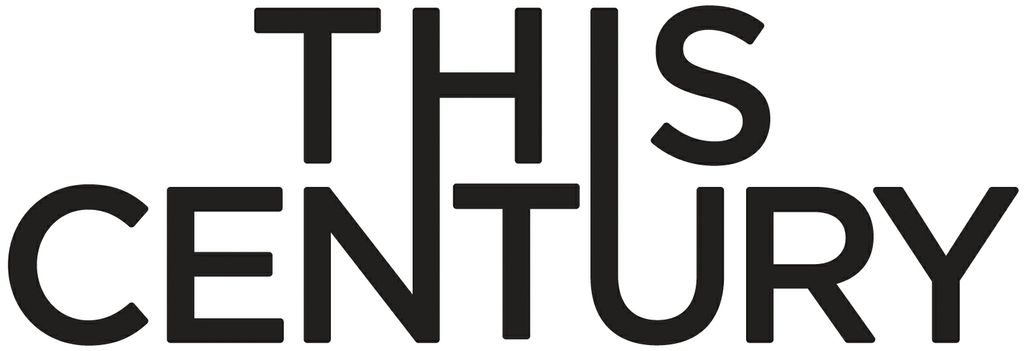
- This Century logo
- Studio albums: 3
- EPs: 7
- Singles: 7
- Music videos: 2

This Century was an American pop rock band from Phoenix, Arizona. It consisted of members Joel Kanitz, Ryan Gose, Sean Silverman, and Alex Silverman. They were signed to Action Theory records, under Warner Bros. The band has three full-length albums: Sound of Fire, Biography of Heartbreak, and Soul Sucker as well as 7 EPs.

== Albums ==
=== Studio albums ===
Year	Album details	Peak chart positions		
Year	Album details	US	US Rock	US Alt
2011	Sound of Fire: Released: April 19, 2011; Label: Action Theory; Format: CD, Digital Download	—	—	—
2013	Biography of Heartbreak: Released: May 14, 2013; Label: Rude Records; Format: CD, Digital Download	—	—	—
2015	Soul Sucker: Released: June 2, 2015; Label: 8123; Format: CD, Digital Download	—	—	—
"—" denotes a release that did not chart.

=== Extended plays ===
Year	Album details	Peak chart positions		
Year	Album details	US	US Rock	US Alt
2007	2007 EP: Released: October 5, 2007; Label: Self-Released; Format: Digital Download	—	—	—
2008	Look What We Made EP: Released: October 31, 2008; Label: Self-Released; Format: CD, Digital Download	—	—	—
2008	No Way Out Digital Sampler: Released: March 10, 2009; Label: Self-Released; Format: Digital Download	—	—	—
2009	To Love and Back EP: Released: June 12, 2009; Label: Action Theory Records; Format: CD, Digital Download	—	—	—
2009	Kiss Me Like It's Christmas: Released: November 27, 2009; Label: NA; Format: Digital Download	—	—	—
2010	Hopeful Romantic Sampler: Released: July 12, 2010; Label: Sire Records; Format: Digital Download	—	—	—
2012	Acoustics EP: Released: January 31, 2012; Label: Rude Records; Format: CD, Digital Download	—	—	—
"—" denotes a release that did not chart.

=== Featured Albums ===
Year	Album details
2010	Punk Goes Pop 3: Released: November 1, 2010; Label: Fearless Records; Format: CD, Digital Download

== Singles ==
Year	Single	Album
2008	"Dream of Christmas"	Dream Of Christmas Single
2009	"Kiss Me Like It's Christmas"	Kiss Me Like It's Christmas EP
2011	"Sound of Fire"	Sound of Fire
2012	"Someone For Everyone"	"Some One For Everyone (feat. Austin Gibbs) Single
2012	"Bleach Blonde"	Bleach Blonde Single
2012	"Skeletons"	Skeletons Single
2013	"Slow Dance Night"	Biography of Heartbreak

== Music videos ==
Year	Title	Director
2011	"Sound of Fire"	—
2013	"Slow Dance Night"	Jakob Owens
2015	"Soul Sucker"	—
"—" denotes the director is unknown.
