= Big Skies (album) =

Studio album by Nick Santino
- Released: May 27, 2014
- Recorded: March – April 2014
- Genre: Country; pop rock
- Length: 40:00
- Label: 8123
- Producer: Pat Kirch; Nick Santino

Nick Santino chronology
Live in Sao Paulo (2014)	Big Skies (2014)	Savannah (2014)

Singles from Big Skies
- 1. "Long Way Home" Released: February 14, 2014; 2. "Mood Ring Eyes" Released: May 23, 2014

Big Skies is the debut studio album by American indie rock singer-songwriter, Nick Santino and was released on May 27, 2014, via 8123 Records. The album peaked at number 24 on the US Heatseekers Albums chart.

== Background ==
In 2013, following the break up of A Rocket to the Moon, Nick Santino went on to pursue a solo career under the name "Nick Santino and the Northern Wind", releasing two EPs. He soon followed up with his debut full-length studio album, Big Skies. Speaking about the record with PopMatters, he stated, "When I put out the EPs it was sort've hard to judge. But with Big Skies it was a full-band rock and roll record and I think it was a lot easier to get into."

In support of the album, Santino embarked on the Long and Winding Roadshow tour in November 2014, with support from This Century, Brian Marquis and Austin Gibbs on all dates, as well as from Bitter Kids on Canadian dates. In October 2014, he joined the Maine on the UK leg of 8123 tour.

== Composition ==
In January and February 2014, Santino wrote the album, before recording it in March and April. Some of the tracks were already written in 2010. The album was produced by Pat Kirch of the Maine and features co-writing and vocals from John O'Callaghan on "Long Way Home". Santino described the album as "pretty natural and roots-y," and stated that the concept of the album focuses on storytelling. He also described the album's sound as "heavy acoustic," with some slight percussion. During the making of the album, Santino stated, "Sometimes I get an idea and I can't wait to get to the closest guitar and work it out." While recording the album, he felt less pressure into creating it.

== Release ==
On February 14, 2014, "Long Way Home" was released as the lead single from Big Skies, via iTunes. On May 23, Santino premiered the song, "Mood Ring Eyes" via Alternative Press, which was released as the album's second single. On May 27, Big Skies was officially released, via 8123. The album was released in the Philippines in June 2014, through PULP Live Records.

== Critical reception ==
Professional ratings
Review scores
Source	Rating
Highlight Magazine	4/5 stars
idobi Radio	B+

Alex Bear of idobi Radio gave a positive review for the album. She stated, "You can tell in every note of Big Skies – Santino is finding his way home. It has the highs and lows of any classic pop rock album, but the endearing country roots show he's ready to expand and refine what A Rocket To The Moon's final album, Wild & Free, explored." Jenn Stookey of Highlight Magazine remarked, "Big Skies is evidence that Santino has found his sound and the direction he wants his future to go. The album does highlight his strength and has some great songs on it, but Santino still needs to do a bit of fine-tuning."

== Track listing ==
All tracks are written by Nick Santino, except where noted.

No.	Title	Writer(s)	Length
1.	"Bad Taste"		3:22
2.	"Can't Say I Miss You"		4:04
3.	"Gone Like Yesterday"		3:08
4.	"Jackson Browne"		3:32
5.	"Keep on Going"		3:51
6.	"Back to Where I'm From"		3:59
7.	"It Is What It Is"		3:20
8.	"Have a Little Faith in Me"		3:52
9.	"Long Way Home"	Santino and John O'Callaghan	4:06
10.	"Mood Ring Eyes"		3:03
11.	"She Don't Miss Me"		4:20
Total length:			40:00

== Personnel ==
Credits adapted from album's liner notes.

- Nick Santino – vocals, guitar, producer, recording
- John O'Callaghan – additional vocals (track 9)
- Pat Kirch – drums, producer, recording
- Alex Silverman – mixing

== Charts ==
Chart performance for Big Skies
Chart (2014)	Peak position
US Heatseekers Albums (Billboard)	24

== Release history ==
Release dates and formats for Big Skies
Region	Date	Format(s)	Label	Ref.
United States	May 27, 2014	CD	8123	
Various	May 27, 2014	Digital download; streaming	8123	
Philippines	June 9, 2014	CD	PULP Live	
