= Hardcore Romance =

Single by Beach Weather

from the album Melt
- Released: August 23, 2024
- Recorded: Saltmine Recording Studio Oasis (Mesa, Arizona)
- Genre: Alternative rock
- Length: 3:19
- Label: 8123; last nite/Arista Records
- Songwriters: Nick Santino; Alex Silverman; Sean Silverman; Reeve Powers; Kevin Fisher
- Producers: Santino; Alex Silverman; Sean Silverman; Damien Leclaire; Robert Adam Stevenson; Ryan Gose

Beach Weather singles chronology
"Hottest Summer on Record" (2024)	"Hardcore Romance" (2024)	"Deadbeat Blue" (2024)

Music video
- "Hardcore Romance" on YouTube

"Hardcore Romance" is a song by American rock band Beach Weather. It was released on August 23, 2024, as the third single from their second studio album, Melt, via 8123 and last nite/Arista Records.

== Background ==
The song was inspired after spending time on the road with The Beaches and lovelytheband. Sean Silverman stated, "We've always tapped into this heavier rock sound when we were like rehearsing, but it never translates on to a record. And I felt like this was the first time we said, 'Oh, can we do this song and still feel like us?' It felt dangerous for us to try it that way — and new and exciting."

== Composition ==
"Hardcore Romance" was written by Nick Santino, Alex Silverman, Sean Silverman, Reeve Powers and Kevin Fisher, while production was handled by Santino, Alex Silverman, Sean Silverman, Damien Leclaire, Robert Adam Stevenson and Ryan Gose. Guitarist Sean Silverman stated it was the first demo he created with Santino in person. The two wanted to portray an intense toxic relationship in the song's lyrics. They wrote the song from the perspective of what "modern romance would look like to us." The opening lyric, "I don't wanna come back down to Earth, I don't really feel like myself," speaks about self-doubt from an emotional standpoint.

== Critical reception ==
Ashley Cardenas of Melodic Magazine stated, "immediately and inevitably gets stuck in your head. The catchy beat mixed with the heavy synth and passionate lyrics are a recipe for a hit song."

== Music video ==
The music video for "Hardcore Romance" premiered on August 23, 2024, and was directed by Alexa San Roman, who worked with the group on their previous single "Unlovable". Shot in a red light atmosphere, the group is shown performing the song in an underground club, while two men are caught "in the middle of a love tug-of-war," fighting for each other's attention throughout the video.

== Remix ==
The song was remixed by American singer-songwriter Ari Abdul, and was released as "Hardcore Romance (feat. Ari Abdul)" on March 28, 2025.

== Track listing ==
Digital download
No.	Title	Length
1.	"Hardcore Romance"	3:19
2.	"Hottest Summer on Record"	3:26
3.	"High in Low Places"	3:10

== Personnel ==
Credits for "Hardcore Romance" adapted from AllMusic.

Beach Weather

- Nick Santino – vocals
- Sean Silverman – guitar
- Reeve Powers – bass

Additional musicians

- Jeremy Wolda – drums

Production

- Nick Santino – producer
- Sean Silverman – producer
- Alex Silverman – producer, mixing, recording engineer
- Doug Weier – mixing
- Mike Cervantes – mastering
- Damien Leclaire – additional producer
- Robert Adam Stevenson – additional producer
- Ryan Gose – additional producer

== Charts ==
Chart performance for "Hardcore Romance"
Chart (2024)	Peak position
Czech Republic Airplay (ČNS IFPI)	51
