= Matt Grabe =

- Born: August 12, 1985 (age 40)
- Origin: Los Angeles, California
- Genres: Rock, Pop, Alternative
- Occupation: Record Producer
- Years active: 2005-Present
- Website: www.MattGrabe.com

Matt Grabe (born 1985 in Phoenix, Arizona) is a record producer based out of Los Angeles, California. Matt studied audio engineering at The Conservatory of Recording Arts and Sciences. Upon finishing his studies, he became a member (guitar/piano) of Equal Vision Records artist Alive In Wild Paint. He now is in the studio full-time recording artists and composing television commercials.

Matt has produced records for William Beckett, This Providence, Katelyn Tarver, The Maine, A Rocket To The Moon, The Summer Set, Rocky Loves Emily as well as composed for Coca-Cola, Google, MINI and more.

== Selected discography ==
YEAR	ARTIST	ALBUM	LABEL	CREDIT
2005	Greeley Estates	Caveat Emptor	Record Collection	Assistant Eng.
2006	Sever Your Ties	First Sign Of Light	Solid State Records	Mix
2007	The Maine	The Way We Talk	Fearless Records	Prod., Eng., Mix
2007	Raining & OK	The Devil On Your Shoulder	Independent	Prod., Eng., Mix
2008	The Maine	...And a Happy New Year	Fearless Records	Prod., Eng., Mix
2008	A Rocket To The Moon	Greetings From...	Fueled By Ramen	Prod., Eng., Mix
2008	Alive In Wild Paint	Ceilings	Equal Vision Records	Additional Eng., Inst.
2009	This Century	To Love And Back	Action Theory	Prod., Eng., Mix
2009	The Summer Set	Love Like This	Razor & Tie Records	Prod., Eng.
2009	Meg & Dia	Hurley Live Sessions 2009	Warner Bros. Records	Eng., Mix
2009	Raining & OK	Always Will Be	Independent	Prod., Eng., Mix
2010	Colour Color	Colour Color	Independent	Prod., Eng., Mix
2010	The Summer Set	Love Like Swift	Razor & Tie Records	Mix
2010	The Word Alive	Punk Goes Pop 3	Fearless Records	Prod., Eng., Mix
2011	The Word Alive	Deceiver (2 Bonus Songs	Fearless Records	Prod., Eng., Mix
2011	Katelyn Tarver	Independent	Independent	Prod., Eng., Mix, Inst.
2011	Austin Gibbs	Fall 2011	Independent	Mix
2012	Colour Color	The Farther We Go	Independent	Prod., Eng., Mix
2012	Rocky Loves Emily	Secrets Don't Make Friends	Tooth & Nail Records	Prod., Eng., Mix
2012	This Providence	Brier	Magic Mike Records	Prod., Eng., Mix
2012	William Beckett	Winds Will Change	YIKE Records	Prod., Eng., Mix, Inst.
2012	William Beckett	What Will Be	YIKE Records	Prod., Eng., Mix
2013	MajorLOVE	Story	Independent	Prod., Eng., Mix
2014	Ozark Pappy	If Our Boat Begins To Sink	Independent	Prod., Eng., Mix
2015	Mosaic MSC	Live in LA	Independent	Prod., Eng., Mix
