= Ever Enough =

Single by A Rocket to the Moon

from the album Wild & Free
- Released: November 27, 2012
- Genre: Country pop
- Length: 3:07
- Label: Fueled by Ramen
- Songwriter(s): Nick Santino; Justin Richards; Eric Halvorsen; Andrew Cook; Josh Jenkins
- Producer(s): Mark Bright

A Rocket to the Moon singles chronology
"Whole Lotta You" (2012)	"Ever Enough" (2012)

Music video
- "Ever Enough" on YouTube

"Ever Enough" is a song by American rock band A Rocket to the Moon. It was released on November 27, 2012, as the second single from their third studio album, Wild & Free. A music video was released in promotion on February 19, 2013.

== Background ==
Lead vocalist Nick Santino described the track as "one of the deepest songs" the band has ever wrote. In an interview with Idolator, Santino stated that the song is about reassurance. He said, "It's about telling the person you care about that you will always be by their side through the thick and the thin, the good and the bad no matter what."

In another interview with 98.7 Amp Radio, Santino noted how the song "hits close to home." He stated, "I've definitely been through those moments in my life in relationships where I'm always like, 'Stop worrying so much. I'm here for you. I'm not going anywhere.'"

== Composition ==
"Ever Enough" was written by Nick Santino, Justin Richards, Eric Halvorsen, Andrew Cook and Josh Jenkins, while production was handled by Mark Bright. As the group was writing the first verse, the band "knew it was going to be a special song." The track has been described as country pop, with influences of balld rock and emo music.

== Release ==
"Ever Enough" was officially released as the second single from Wild & Free on November 27, 2012, via digital download. The song was released for streaming via SoundCloud on December 10. On December 31, the group released an acoustic version of the song, which was recorded in Santino's home.

== Critical reception ==
"Ever Enough" was met with positive reviews from music critics. Luke O'Neil of MTV stated, "The song, a total last-dance prom ballad, has a hint of sensitively plucked country-pop twang lurking under the surface of its emo-coustic slow jam veneer. Although if you ask us, it surprisingly kind of harkens back to some classic Oasis-style ballad rock, minus the guitar bombast." Jason Lipshutz of Billboard noted that the track "carries an underlying appreciation of Nashville, after On Your Side... presented a more straight-ahead pop sensibility." Robbie Daw of Idolator remarked, "'Ever Enough', produced by Mark Bright, plays like a natural progression from those four tunes, as the guitar-and-piano ballad kicks off on an acoustic note then launches into a love song so cinematic, it would make make Rascal Flatts or, hell, even Bryan Adams envious.

== Music video ==
The music video for "Ever Enough" premiered via YouTube on February 19, 2013, and was directed by Mark Staubach. The video stars American actress Debby Ryan and showcases her and Santino on a romantic road trip through the desert. As the video progresses, Ryan gets sick and the two live out whatever time she has left. They manage to make the most of things by roaming around a light-filled casino and getting married in an Elvis-run Vegas chapel. Within one month, the video garnered 679,000 views. It was filmed in December 2012.

== Track listing ==
Digital download
No.	Title	Length
1.	"Ever Enough"	3:07

Digital download – acoustic
No.	Title	Length
1.	"Ever Enough" (acoustic)	3:12

== Personnel ==
Credits for "Ever Enough" per Wild & Free booklet.

A Rocket to the Moon

- Nick Santino – vocals, rhythm guitar
- Justin Richards – lead guitar, backing vocals
- Eric Halvorsen – bass, backing vocals
- Andrew Cook – drums

Additional musicians

- Josh Jenkins – additional vocals

Production

- Mark Bright – producer, recording
- Adam Ayan – mastering
- Chris Ashburn – assistant mixing engineer
- Chris Smalls – digital editor
- Derek Bason – mixing
- Shawn Daugherty – assistant engineer
- Todd Tidwell – recording

== Release history ==
Release dates and formats for "Ever Enough"
Region	Date	Format	Label	Ref.
Various	November 27, 2012	Digital download	Fueled By Ramen	
