= Chit Chat (EP) =

EP by Beach Weather
- Released: November 4, 2016
- Genre: Synth pop
- Length: 21:57
- Label: 8123
- Producer: Alex Silverman; Sean Silverman

Beach Weather chronology
| What a Drag (2015) | Chit Chat (2016) | Basement Sessions (2017) |

Singles from Chit Chat
- 1. "Someone's Disaster" Released: September 23, 2016; 2. "Chit Chat" Released: October 14, 2016

Chit Chat is the second extended play by American rock band Beach Weather. The EP was released on November 4, 2016, via 8123 Records. The EP was produced by Alex and Sean Silverman, while co-production was handled by Nick Santino.

== Composition ==
Chit Chat was produced and recorded by Alex and Sean Silverman, while Nick Santino co-produced the EP. "Home Movies" was originally written for their first EP, What a Drag, however, felt that it wasn't the right time to put it out and decided to include it on Chit Chat instead. "Sex, Drugs, Etc." was almost cut from the EP, as the group believed that "people wouldn't resonate" with the song.

Santino stated that the EP was inspired by Peter Gabriel's So, Jackson Browne's Late for the Sky, Kurt Vile's Wakin on a Pretty Daze, The War On Drugs' Lost in the Dream and Tame Impala's Currents.

== Release ==
On September 14, 2016, the group released an official visualizer for "Someone's Disaster". The song was released on September 23, as the EP's lead single via digital download. On October 13, Clash magazine premiered the song "Chit Chat", before it was released as the second single from the EP the following day. On November 3, "Home Movies" was released for streaming via Alternative Press, ahead of the EP's release.

== Critical reception ==
Professional ratings
Review scores
| Source | Rating |
|---|---|
| Highlight Magazine | 4.5/5 stars |
| idobi Radio | A |

Chit Chat was met with positive reviews from music critics. Emillie Marvel of idobi Radio stated that the EP, "mastered starry arrangements, nostalgic melodies, fun beats, and undeniably catchy hooks." Lindy Smith of Alternative Press called the EP "a definite step up" from their debut EP, What a Drag. She noted how the group mastered "a blend of indie and synth vibes." Annette Hansen of Highlight Magazine remarked, "The EP is effortlessly catchy as it opens on namesake track 'Chit Chat,' a song that feels relaxed and equally rock n' roll. Beach Weather shifts to a more synth-pop vibe on the following track 'Home Movies,' but the 80s-esque synth-pop peaks on 'Goddess,' which feels both modern and retro with its bright synths and jazzy saxophone." Naomi Grace of Unclear Magazine called the EP, "the best kind for those who appreciate alternative music done at best. Nick Santino absolutely kills these pieces with emotion and musical variety, feeling it all."

=== Accolades ===
Accolades for Chit Chat
| Publication | Accolade | Year | Ref. |
|---|---|---|---|
| Alternative Press | 12 Best EPs of 2016 | 2016 | |

== Track listing ==
All tracks are written by Alex Silverman, Austin Scates, Nick Santino and Sean Silverman.

| No. | Title | Length |
|---|---|---|
| 1. | "Chit Chat" | 3:20 |
| 2. | "Home Movies" | 3:48 |
| 3. | "Someone's Disaster" | 3:33 |
| 4. | "Goddess" | 4:32 |
| 5. | "Tremors" | 3:28 |
| 6. | "Sex, Drugs, Etc." | 3:16 |
| Total length: | | 21:57 |

== Personnel ==
Credits adapted from album's liner notes.

Beach Weather

- Nick Santino – vocals, rhythm guitar
- Reeve Powers – bass
- Austin Scates – drums

Additional musicians

- Alex Silverman – bass, keyboards
- Sean Silverman – lead guitar, keyboards

Production

- Alex Silverman – producer, engineering, mixing, recording
- Sean Silverman – producer, engineering, recording
- Nick Santino – co-producer
- Dan Coutant – mastering

== Release history ==
Release dates and formats for Chit Chat
| Region | Date | Format(s) | Label | Ref. |
|---|---|---|---|---|
| Various | November 4, 2016 | CD; digital download; streaming | 8123 | |
