= Greetings From... EP =

Greetings From...

EP by A Rocket to the Moon
- Released: October 13, 2008
- Recorded: 2008
- Genre: Pop rock; indie rock
- Length: 17:37
- Label: Decaydance; Fueled by Ramen
- Producer: Matt Grabe

A Rocket to the Moon chronology
| Summer 07 (2007) | Greetings From... (2008) | On Your Side (2009) |

Greetings From... is the second EP by American rock band A Rocket to the Moon. It was released through Fueled by Ramen on October 13, 2008. The album peaked at number 21 on the Billboard Heatseekers Albums chart.

== Background and release ==
Greetings From... was produced by Matt Grabe and features guest vocals from John O'Callaghan from The Maine and Justin Richards from Brighten. The EP also features previous single, "Fear of Flying" from their debut EP, Summer 07. "Dakota" reappears on their second studio album, On Your Side.

The EP was released on October 13, 2008, for digital download and was released physically the following day. "If Only They Knew" was released as a promotional single and had its music video premiere on May 13, 2009.

== Critical reception ==
Professional ratings
Review scores
| Source | Rating |
|---|---|
| TheAlbumProject | 4/5 stars |

TheAlbumProject gave the EP a positive review, rewarding it a 4 out of 5 star rating and remarked, "focus on the music because this is some good scene pop, guilty pleasure stuff. There is of course a tad bit of electronic beats, piano, as well as some great sounding acoustic guitar. At the end of the day this is really catchy music that you'll probably enjoy."

== Track listing ==
All tracks are written by A Rocket to the Moon, except where noted.

| No. | Title | Length |
|---|---|---|
| 1. | "If Only They Knew" (A Rocket to the Moon, Justin Richards) | 2:33 |
| 2. | "Dakota" (A Rocket to the Moon, Justin Richards) | 3:31 |
| 3. | "I'm Not Saying Goodbye" | 3:18 |
| 4. | "Fear of Flying" | 3:56 |
| 5. | "Just Another One" (A Rocket to the Moon, Justin Richards) | 4:19 |
| Total length: | | 17:37 |

== Personnel ==
Credits adapted from album's liner notes.

A Rocket to the Moon

- Nick Santino – vocals, guitar
- Justin Richards – guitar
- Eric Halvorsen – bass
- Loren Brinton – drums

Additional musicians

- John O'Callaghan – vocals (on "Just Another One")

Production

- Matt Grabe – producer, mixing, recording
- Alex Kirzhner – design, layout
- Nick Santino – art concept
- UE Nastasi – mastering (Sterling Sound, New York)

== Charts ==
Chart performance for Greetings From...
| Chart (2008) | Peak position |
|---|---|
| US Heatseekers Albums (Billboard) | 21 |

== Release history ==
Release formats for Greetings From...
| Region | Date | Format(s) | Label(s) | Ref. |
|---|---|---|---|---|
| Various | October 13, 2008 | Digital download | Fueled by Ramen | |
| Various | October 14, 2008 | CD | Decaydance; Fueled by Ramen | |
