= Melt (Beach Weather album) =

Studio album by Beach Weather
- Released: October 25, 2024
- Recorded: January 2024
- Studio: Saltmine Recording Studio Oasis (Mesa, Arizona)
- Genre: Indie rock; pop rock; synth-pop
- Length: 37:45
- Label: 8123; last nite/Arista Records
- Producer: Nick Santino; Sean Silverman; Alex Silverman; Damien Leclaire; Robert Adam Stevenson; Ryan Gose

Beach Weather chronology
Pineapple Sunset (2023)	Melt (2024)

Singles from Melt
- 1. "High in Low Places" Released: May 31, 2024; 2. "Hottest Summer on Record" Released: July 19, 2024; 3. "Hardcore Romance" Released: August 23, 2024; 4. "Deadbeat Blue" Released: September 27, 2024; 5. "Fake Nice" Released: October 25, 2024

Melt is the second studio album by American pop rock band Beach Weather. The album was released on October 25, 2024, via 8123 and last nite/Arista Records. The group released four singles prior to the album's release, "High in Low Places", "Hottest Summer on Record", "Hardcore Romance" and "Deadbeat Blue". The fifth single, "Fake Nice" was released on the same day as the album.

== Background and recording ==
Speaking about the concept and inspiration behind Melt, Nick Santino stated,

"Melt is a deep dive into the human condition. When I was younger, my songs were about imaginary relationships, fictional people, and borrowed emotions. Creating Melt brought real tears—a testament to change, resilience, and personal growth. This record isn't just about our personal stories; it's about emotions we all feel but don't always speak out loud."

The title "Melt" was the first name of song titles they had when they started writing the album. The group felt that the name stood out because of its simplicity and how the first few songs all had a theme of romance, ultimately deciding to build the record around it.

== Composition ==
Melt contains 12 tracks, and features a darker sound than their previous album, Pineapple Sunrise. According to the band, they wanted a heavy contrast between Melt and Pineapple Sunrise, pushing themselves into creating and writing "darker and more personal territories." Many of the songs were written in October and December 2023, while the last few were written weeks before they started recording the album in January 2024. During the creation of the record, they were listening to "a lot of" The Beatles and early 70s' rock, which influenced them to having a concept of romance into their songs. While on their Pineapple Sunrise Tour in early 2024, they had the album mixed and tracked vocals in dressing rooms and recorded one of the tracks in a hotel room in Boise, Idaho. The lead track "Desert Disco" is a slow-tempo track featuring a synth sound and is the shortest song on the album. The second track "Melt" is a mid-tempo indie rock track. "Hardcore Romance" is described as alternative rock and according to Sean Silverman, it was the first song he wrote with Santino for the album. The song, along with "High in Low Places" and "Brain Dead" all contain a synth and electronic sound, while "Clueless" is described as a guitar heavy driven track. "Stardust" is the longest song on the album, with a run time of 5 minutes and 10 seconds.

== Release ==
Following their headlining Pineapple Sunrise tour in support of their debut studio album, the band began releasing music from their second studio album. They released the album's lead single "High in Low Places" on May 31, 2024, along with premiering a music video for the song. The song peaked at number 15 on the US Alternative Airplay chart. The group later released "Hottest Summer on Record" as the album's second single on July 19. On August 23, the band released "Hardcore Romance" as the album's third single, along with announcement that their second studio album, Melt, would be released on October 25. It reached number 51 on the Czech Singles Chart. On September 27, they released the four single "Deadbeat Blue", featuring BEL. The album's fifth single, "Fake Nice" was released on the same day as the album. In support of the album, the group announced the Will Make You... Melt tour, with dates running in the US and UK. On March 29, 2025, the group announced the deluxe edition for Melt under the title Melt'd, which is set to be released on May 30. The group joined Pierce the Veil on their headlining I Can't Hear You tour in May 2025.

== Critical reception ==
Ashley Cardenas of Melodic gave a positive review for the album stating, "it's so well composed that there’s seamless transitions within the composition that truly keeps the listener engaged in every second."

== Track listing ==
No.	Title	Length
1.	"Desert Disco"	1:38
2.	"Melt"	2:35
3.	"High in Low Places"	3:10
4.	"Fake Nice"	3:27
5.	"Hardcore Romance"	3:19
6.	"Nightcrawler"	2:50
7.	"Hottest Summer on Record"	3:26
8.	"Deadbeat Blue" (featuring BEL)	2:34
9.	"Brain Dead"	2:42
10.	"Paranormal Activity"	3:07
11.	"Clueless"	3:47
12.	"Stardust"	5:10
Total length:		37:45

Melt'd – deluxe version
No.	Title	Length
13.	"Seth Cohen"	2:11
14.	"Tulips"	2:43
15.	"Monochrome"	3:13
16.	"Fake Nice" (featuring Kevin Kaarl)	3:29
17.	"Hardcore Romance" (featuring Ari Abdul)	3:21
18.	"Dressing Room Tattoo"	2:22
Total length:		55:04

== Personnel ==
Credits adapted from album's liner notes.

Beach Weather

- Nick Santino – vocals, rhythm guitar
- Reeve Powers – bass, backing vocals
- Sean Silverman – lead guitar

Additional musicians

- Jeremy Wolda – drums (track 1–2, 4–12)
- Alex Bruno – backing vocals (track 1)
- BEL – featured artist (track 8)

Production

- Nick Santino – producer
- Sean Silverman – producer
- Alex Silverman – producer, mixing, recording engineer
- Doug Weier – mixing (track 5)
- Mike Cervantes – mastering
- Damien Leclaire – producer
- Robert Adam Stevenson – producer
- Ryan Gose – producer

== Release history ==
Release formats for Melt
Region	Date	Format(s)	Label	Ref.
Various	October 25, 2024	CD; digital download; LP; streaming	8123; last nite/Arista Records	
