= Thoughts I Have While Lying in Bed =

Single by The Maine featuring Beach Weather

from the album The Maine
- Released: August 30, 2023
- Studio: 8123 Studios
- Length: 3:39
- Label: 8123; Photo Finish
- Songwriters: John O'Callaghan; Kennedy Brock; Pat Kirch; Jared Monaco; Garrett Nickelsen
- Producer: Colby Wedgeworth

The Maine singles chronology
"Dose No. 2" (2023)	"Thoughts I Have While Lying in Bed" (2023)	"Leave in Five" (2023)

Beach Weather singles chronology
"Pineapple Sunrise" (2023)	"Thoughts I Have While Lying in Bed" (2023)	"High in Low Places" (2024)

Music video
- "Thoughts I Have While Lying in Bed" on YouTube

"Thoughts I Have While Lying in Bed" is a song by American rock group The Maine. The song was released on August 30, 2023 as the fourth single from their ninth studio album, The Maine along with its music video. The song was re-released on November 24, 2023, featuring American pop rock band Beach Weather.

== Background and release ==
The band released a new version of the track on November 24, 2023, featuring Nick Santino of Beach Weather. O'Callaghan spoke about the collaboration stating, "It's not often that I get to hear someone else sing on a tune of ours. It's even less frequent to hear someone I've known for 17 years on that same tune. I'm forever a fan of Nick and his voice and now it makes it 50% less weird to listen to the thoughts I have."

== Composition ==
"Thoughts I Have While Lying in Bed" was written by John O'Callaghan, Kennedy Brock, Pat Kirch, Jared Monaco and Garrett Nickelsen while production was handled by Colby Wedgeworth. In an interview with The Honey Pop, the band spoke about the song's inspiration:

"Towards the back half of the record I wanted to create songs that went through the different stages I've experienced while falling in love [...] 'Thoughts' was me trying to find reasons why I wasn't falling love but not being able to find a single good one."

== Critical reception ==
Amit Vaidya of Rolling Stone India stated that, "Beach Weather add a special ingredient to the new edition that elevates an already good song by The Maine into a very much more commercial venture." She also added, "This is perfect synergy and here's hoping their work together helps the song crack the Top 40 and become a global hit for both deserving bands." Adam Grundy of Chorus.fm stated that the track, "re-captures that atmospheric spirit of Lovely Little Lonely, and highlights the band's ability to tell a story and connect with their audience." The song has surpassed over a million streams on Spotify.

== Music video ==
A music video for "Thoughts I Have While Lying In Bed" premiered on August 30, 2023. Directed by Nick Stafford, the video was filmed in Cincinnati and was shot in black and white, showing O'Callaghan walking on a bridge with a cityscape in the background.

== Track listing ==
Digital download

No.	Title	Length
1.	"Thoughts I Have While Lying in Bed" (featuring Beach Weather)	3:39
2.	"Thoughts I Have While Lying in Bed"	3:39

== Personnel ==
The Maine

- John O'Callaghhan – lead vocals
- Kennedy Brock – rhythm guitar, backing vocals
- Jared Monaco – lead guitar
- Pat Kirch – drums
- Garrett Nickelsen – bass

Production

- Colby Wedgeworth – producer

== Charts ==
Chart performance for "Thoughts I Have While Lying in Bed"
Chart (2024)	Peak position
US Alternative Airplay (Billboard)	23

== Release history ==
Release dates and formats for "Thoughts I Have While Lying in Bed"
Region	Date	Format	Label	Ref.
Various	November 24, 2023	Digital download	8123	
United States	November 29, 2023	Alternative radio	Photo Finish	
