= Like We Used To =

Single by A Rocket to the Moon

from the album On Your Side
- Released: June 15, 2010
- Length: 3:23
- Label: Fueled by Ramen
- Songwriter(s): Nick Santino; Justin Richards; Eric Halvorsen; Loren Brinton; Andrew Cook; Dan Young
- Producer(s): Matt Squire

A Rocket to the Moon singles chronology
"Santa Claus Is Comin' to Town" (2009)	"Like We Used To" (2010)	"Whole Lotta You" (2012)

Music video
- "Like We Used To" on YouTube

"Like We Used To" is a song by American rock band A Rocket to the Moon. It was released on June 15, 2010, as the second single from their second studio album, On Your Side. A music video premiered on June 7, 2010, and was featured on MTV's Teen Mom in October 2010.

== Background ==
According to Nick Santino, the song almost didn't make the final cut on their second studio album, On Your Side. However, the band made a decision to cut one of the other tracks in favour for a ballad song. The song is about a break up and Santino stated, "It's about being dumped and your significant other moving on really fast and finding someone new. At first, you are super-bitter and upset about it, and then you realize that she is happy and better off without you."

The group re-recorded the track with Larkin Poe for their EP, The Rainy Day Sessions, released in October 2010. The song was also used on the season finale of MTV's Teen Mom.

== Composition ==
"Like We Used To was written by Nick Santino, Justin Richards, Eric Halvorsen, Loren Brinton, Andrew Cook and Dan Young of This Providence, while production was handled by Matt Squire. Santino and Richards wrote the song in the back of their van in approximately 45 minutes, following a show in Michigan. They flew out to Los Angeles the following day to record the song. The track runs at 88 BPM and is in the key of D major. Santino's range in the song spans from the notes D4 – B5.

== Chart performance ==
"Like We Used To" peaked at number 91 on the Billboard Hot 100. The song also reached number six on the US Heatseekers Songs chart. It peaked at number six on the US Rock Digital Song Sales chart and spent 15 weeks on the chart. According to the Nielsen Soundscan, the song sold 22,000 units in the US the week after it was used on Teen Mom and selling four times the amount it sold the week prior. As of February 2013, the song sold 300,000 copies in the US.

== Music video ==
The music video for "Like We Used To" premiered on June 7, 2010, on Fueled by Ramen's YouTube channel. The video was shot in Santa Barbara, California, and was directed by Hannah Lux Davis. It was filmed in May 2010.

== Track listing ==
Digital download
No.	Title	Length
1.	"Like We Used To"	3:23
2.	"Like We Used To" (piano version)	4:17
3.	"Like We Used To" (music video)	3:26

== Personnel ==
Credits for "Like We Used To" per On Your Side booklet.

A Rocket to the Moon

- Nick Santino – vocals, rhythm guitar
- Justin Richards – lead guitar
- Eric Halvorsen – bass
- Andrew Cook – drums

Additional musicians

- Loren Brinton – drums

Production

- Matt Squire – producer, mixing
- Travis Huff – additional producer, engineering
- UE Nastasi – mastering (Sterling Sound, New York)

== Charts ==
Chart performance for "Like We Used To"
Chart (2010)	Peak position
US Billboard Hot 100	91
US Heatseekers Songs (Billboard)	6
US Rock Digital Song Sales (Billboard)	6

== Certifications ==
Region	Certification	Certified units/sales
United States (RIAA)	Gold	500,000^{‡}
^{‡} Sales+streaming figures based on certification alone.

== Release history ==
Release dates and formats for "Like We Used To"
Region	Date	Format	Label	Ref.
United States	June 15, 2010	Contemporary hit radio	Roadrunner	
Various	October 19, 2010	Digital download	Fueled By Ramen	
