= Acoustics (This Century EP) =

EP by This Century
- Released: January 21, 2012
- Genre: Pop rock
- Length: 16:01
- Label: 81 Twenty Three (US)

This Century chronology
Sound of Fire (2011)	Acoustics (2012)	Biography of Heartbreak (2013)

Acoustics is an EP by Phoenix, Arizona pop rock group This Century. It was released on January 21, 2012, and includes four acoustic tracks from their previous full-length album Sound of Fire as well as a new song entitled "Indigo Girl".

== Track listing ==
No.	Title	Length
1.	"Do It To Me"	3:19
2.	"Hopeful Romantic"	2:55
3.	"Indigo Girl"	3:30
4.	"Sound of Fire"	3:01
5.	"Everywhere Everything"	3:16
Total length:		16:01

== Personnel ==
Members

- Joel Kanitz – Vocals
- Sean Silverman – Guitar
- Alex Silverman – Bass, keyboard
- Ryan Gose – Drums
