= Look What We Made EP =

Look What We Made
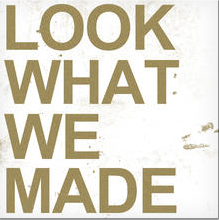

EP by This Century
- Released: October 31, 2008
- Genre: Pop rock
- Length: 13:00

This Century chronology
2007 EP (2007)	Look What We Made (2008)	No Way Out Digital Sampler (2009)

Look What We Made is a four-track EP that was released on October 31, 2008, by Phoenix, Arizona pop rock band This Century.

== Track listing ==
No.	Title	Length
1.	"It's Not You It's Me"	2:18
2.	"Acts of Desperation"	4:15
3.	"Want You"	3:01
4.	"The Moment"	3:26
Total length:		13:00

== Personnel ==
Members

- Joel Kanitz – Vocals
- Sean Silverman – Guitar
- Alex Silverman – Bass, keyboard
- Ryan Gose – Drums
