= Biography of Heartbreak =

Studio album by This Century
- Released: May 14, 2013
- Genre: Pop rock
- Length: 47:02
- Label: 81 Twenty Three (US); Rude Records (Rest of the World)

This Century chronology
Acoustics (2012)	Biography of Heartbreak (2013)	Soul Sucker (2015)

Professional ratings
Review scores
Source	Rating
Alternative Press	3.5/5 stars
Into The Crowd Magazine	4/5 stars
Alter The Press	3/5 stars
Kill Your Stereo	70%

Biography of Heartbreak is the second full-length album by American pop rock band This Century. It was released worldwide on May 14, 2013, via Rude Records in Europe, the UK, Southeast Asia, Australia and Japan, and independently in the US in partnership with their management team Eighty One Twenty Three.

Produced by Colby Wedgeworth (The Maine, Lydia), the album includes "Bleach Blonde" and "Skeletons" as well as 11 brand new tracks. On April 23, 2013, This Century released a music video for the first single "Slow Dance Night" on Vevo. In support of the album, This Century joined The 8123 Tour with management label-mates The Maine as well as A Rocket to the Moon and Brighten.

== Track listing ==
No.	Title	Length
1.	"Slow Dance Night"	3:10
2.	"Love Killer"	3:38
3.	"Bleach Blonde"	3:22
4.	"Tip Toe"	3:25
5.	"My Weakness"	2:50
6.	"Run and Hide"	3:38
7.	"Footsteps"	4:09
8.	"Skeletons"	4:01
9.	"Forbidden"	3:31
10.	"Sideways"	3:44
11.	"Fool's Game"	3:28
12.	"Biography of Heartbreak"	4:11
13.	"Deadly Weapon"	3:55
Total length:		47:02

== Personnel ==
Members

- Joel Kanitz – Vocals
- Sean Silverman – Guitar
- Alex Silverman – Bass, keyboard
- Ryan Gose – Drums

Production

- Colby Wedgeworth – Producer, engineer, Mixer
- Dan Coutant – Master
- Alex Silverman – Additional Programming
- Joel Kanitz – Art Direction and Design
- Dirk Mai – Photography
- Tim Kirch – Artist Management
- Tanner Radcliffe – Artist Management
