= High in Low Places =

Single by Beach Weather

from the album Melt
- Released: May 31, 2024
- Genre: Alternative rock
- Length: 3:10
- Label: 8123; last nite/Arista Records
- Songwriters: Nick Santino; Alex Silverman; Sean Silverman; Reeve Powers; Kevin Fisher
- Producers: Santino; Damien Leclaire; Robert Adam Stevenson; Ryan Gose; Alex Silverman; Sean Silverman

Beach Weather singles chronology
"Thoughts I Have While Lying in Bed" (2023)	"High in Low Places" (2024)	"Hottest Summer on Record" (2024)

Music video
- "High in Low Places" on YouTube

"High in Low Places" is a song by American rock band Beach Weather. It was released on May 31, 2024, as the lead single from their second studio album, Melt.

== Background ==
Upon the release of "High in Low Places", Beach Weather shared a post on Instagram with the caption, "Welcome to our desert disco." Nick Santino described the track as their "apocalyptic love song." He explained how the concept of the song was to find "peace in one another while the world was slowly melting."

== Composition ==
"High in Low Places" was written by Nick Santino, Alex Silverman, Sean Silverman and Reeve Powers and Kevin Fisher. Production was handled by members of the band as well as from Damien Leclaire, Robert Adam Stevenson and Ryan Gose. The track is described as alternative rock, featuring groovy basslines, shimmering guitar chords and soothing vocals. According to Santino, the guitar and string parts during the song's chorus were influenced of a closing credits to "a modern end-of-times western" movie.

== Music video ==
The music video for "High in Low Places" premiered via VEVO on May 31, 2024, and was directed by Beewax. Shot in the desert, Santino stated, "We wanted to create something that felt cinematic." Within one week, the song garnered 37,000 views on YouTube.

== Personnel ==
Credits for "High in Low Places" adapted from AllMusic.

Beach Weather

- Nick Santino – vocals, rhythm guitar
- Sean Silverman – lead guitar, backing vocals
- Reeve Powers – bass, backing vocals

Production

- Alex Silverman – producer, engineering, mixing
- Sean Silverman – producer
- Nick Santino – producer
- Damien Leclaire – producer
- Robert Adam Stevenson – producer
- Ryan Gose – producer
- Mike Cervantes – mastering

== Charts ==
Chart performance for "High in Low Places"
Chart (2024)	Peak position
US Alternative Airplay (Billboard)	15

== Release history ==
Release dates and formats for "High in Low Places"
Region	Date	Format	Label	Ref.
Various	May 31, 2024	Digital download	8123; last nite/Arista Records	
United States	June 10, 2024	Alternative radio	8123; last nite/Arista Records	
