= Unlovable (song) =

Single by Beach Weather featuring Pale Waves

from the album Pineapple Sunrise
- Released: August 12, 2022
- Length: 3:30
- Label: 8123; last nite/Arista Records
- Songwriters: Nick Santino; Alex Silverman; Sean Silverman; Austin Scates; Heather Baron-Gracie (Note: Credited songwriting on Pale Waves version.)
- Producers: Alex Silverman; Sean Silverman

Beach Weather featuring Pale Waves singles chronology
"Sex, Drugs, Etc." (2022)	"Unlovable" (2022)	"Trouble with This Bed" (2022)

Pale Waves singles chronology
"Clean" (2022)	"Unlovable" (2023)	"She's So Cool" (2023)

Music video
- "Unlovable" on YouTube

"Unlovable" is a song by American rock band Beach Weather. It was released on August 12, 2022, as the second single from their debut studio album, Pineapple Sunrise. The song was later re-released on June 2, 2023, featuring English rock band Pale Waves.

== Background ==
"Unlovable" finds the group exploring themes of loneliness, anxiety and emotional tumult. In a statement, the band revealed:

"'Unlovable' is vulnerable, insecure, and self-deprecating... and that's what makes it so lovable. We had been building all of these ideas in our heads of what we thought we needed to be and whether we could be satisfied with who we actually were. I think in a way it's about questioning your own value. Wondering if you'll ever truly be enough and never completely meeting expectations. At the same time being satisfied knowing that it’s human to feel that way."

It was released as the second single from Pineapple Sunrise on August 12, 2022. On June 2, 2023, they re-released the single, featuring vocal contributions from English band Pale Waves. Sean Silverman spoke about having the band on the track, noting how after listening to their song, "She's My Religion", he "envisioned" collaborating with them. He also felt that "having a contrasting vocal" offered a different perspective, which resonated with them and they began recording with Heather Baron-Gracie.

== Composition ==
Nick Santino initially wrote the title of the track in 2017. While he was at an airport, he heard the word "unlovable" and decided to write it down. He ended up writing down the line, "How'd I get so damn unlovable?." Santino revealed that the song is about having "moments where we sink into that self-consciousness of feeling unworthy of love" and called it "a spiritual successor" to "Sex, Drugs, Etc.", as they both "come from very similar places." Sean Silverman described the track as "the big brother song to 'Sex, Drugs, Etc'." He also revealed that the song "came together naturally" and was the easiest to put together.

== Chart performance ==
"Unlovable" peaked at number 11 on the Billboard Alternative Airplay chart. The song also reached number 27 on the Billboard Rock Airplay chart. It peaked at number seven on the Czech Republic Singles chart.

== Music video ==
On August 12, 2022, the group released an official visualizer for "Unlovable". The band premiered the music video for the song on September 14, 2022, and was directed by Alexa San Román.

== Track listing ==
Digital download
No.	Title	Length
1.	"Unlovable"	3:30

Digital download – feat. Pale Waves
No.	Title	Length
1.	"Unlovable" (featuring Pale Waves)	3:30

Digital download – acoustic
No.	Title	Length
1.	"Unlovable" (stripped down)	3:41

== Personnel ==
Credits for "Unlovable" per Pineapple Sunrise booklet.

Beach Weather

- Nick Santino – vocals, rhythm guitar
- Sean Silverman – lead guitar
- Reeve Powers – bass
- Austin Scates – drums

Additional musicians

- Alex Silverman – keyboards

Production

- Alex Silverman – producer, recording
- Sean Silverman – producer
- Nick Santino – additional producer
- Randy Merrill – mastering
- Matt Malpass – mixing

== Charts ==
=== Weekly charts ===
Weekly chart performance for "Unlovable"
Chart (2023–2024)	Peak position
Czech Republic Airplay (ČNS IFPI)	7
US Rock & Alternative Airplay (Billboard)	27

=== Year-end charts ===
Year-end chart performance for "Unlovable"
Chart (2023)	Position
US Alternative Airplay (Billboard)	35

== Release history ==
Release dates and formats for "Unlovable"
Region	Date	Format	Version	Label	Ref.
Various	August 12, 2022	Digital download	Original	8123; last nite/Arista Records	
United States	March 28, 2023	Alternative radio	Original	8123; last nite/Arista Records	
Various	April 28, 2023	Digital download	Acoustic	8123; last nite/Arista Records	
Various	June 2, 2023	Digital download	feat. Pale Waves	8123; last nite/Arista Records	
