= Beach Weather =

American rock band

Background information
- Origin: Braintree, Massachusetts, U.S.
- Genres: Alternative rock; indie pop; pop rock
- Years active: 2015–2017, 2022–present
- Labels: 8123 (2015–present) last nite/Arista Records (2022–present)
- Spinoff of: A Rocket to the Moon
- Members: Nick Santino; Reeve Powers; Sean Silverman
- Past members: Austin Scates; Ian Holubiak
- Website: www.beachweather.us

Beach Weather is an American indie rock band formed in 2015 by lead vocalist and rhythm guitarist Nick Santino, best known for their song "Sex, Drugs, Etc." which was certified Platinum on May 16, 2023.

Beach Weather has released four EPs and their debut full-length studio album, Pineapple Sunrise, was released on March 3, 2023, through Arista Records. They released their second studio album, Melt, on October 25, 2024, also through Arista Records.

== History ==
=== 2015–2017: Formation, first years and hiatus ===
In August 2015, Nick Santino, former frontman for A Rocket to the Moon, began working with producer Sean Silverman (of The Technicolors), writing and recording demos after A Rocket To The Moon disbanded. The two realized that "people might really dig what we were making" and started asking other bands if they could join them on tour. Santino also reached out to his friend Reeves Power if he wanted to be involved with the group, which he did. The original line up of Beach Weather consisted of Nick Santino (vocals), Reeve Powers (bass), Ian Holubiak (lead guitar) and Austin Scates (drums) after being invited by the Maine to open for their Free For All 2015 Tour. On August 2, the group premiered their debut single, "Wolf" for streaming. Their debut EP, What a Drag was written by Santino and Silverman, and released on August 28, 2015, via 8123.

On February 3, 2016, Beach Weather released a music video for "New Skin". In February–March 2016, Beach Weather supported Sleeping with Sirens through Europe and the UK on their Madness Tour alongside This Wild Life and Mallory Knox. In May 2016, the band supported PVRIS on their North America Headlining Summer Tour. On June 28, 2016, the group released a music video for "Swoon". In September 2016, Beach Weather toured with Against the Current on their In Our Bones World Tour alongside As It Is. On September 14, 2016, Beach Weather released "Someone's Disaster" as the lead single from their forthcoming second EP. On October 13, 2016, "Chit Chat" was streamed exclusively through Clash, before it was released as the second single from the EP the following day. Their second EP, Chit Chat, produced by Alex and Sean Silverman, was released on November 4, 2016, via 8123.

In March–May 2017, Beach Weather supported The Maine on their Lovely Little Lonely tour in the US, along with The Mowgli's. On July 14, 2017, the band released their EP, Basement Sessions and a day later announced that they will be taking a hiatus indefinitely. Speaking in depth of their hiatus in a 2022 interview with Alternative Press, Santino revealed that they were "leaning into bad habits" and "started to not really like" who they were becoming. He also wanted to focus on himself as he got married around that time and began a career in graphic design.

=== 2022–2024: Return and Pineapple Sunrise ===
Content with closing the chapter on Beach Weather, Santino found himself thinking about music again during the COVID-19 pandemic and was approached by Silverman about material he was working on. They began sending each other notes and ideas, which influenced Santino's excitement into writing music again. In June 2021, the group quietly reunited and started working on their debut studio album. They flew out to Phoenix, Arizona, to record the album and were given a recording space from the Maine to use. On January 20, 2022, after nearly five years of being on hiatus, Beach Weather performed at the Rebel Lounge for 8123 fest, marking their official return. Sean Silverman, who spent his time with the band during their early years of a behind the scenes role, transitioned into a permanent member of the group in 2022.

In June 2022, the song "Sex, Drugs, Etc." grew popular on TikTok, which led to its servicing to radio. The song was serviced to alternative radio on August 1, 2022. Beach Weather also released its music video in September 2022, six years after the song was first released as a part of their Chit Chat EP. The song topped the Billboard Alternative Airplay Chart for the week of October 27, 2022, and peaked at number one on Bubbling Under Hot 100 chart for the week of February 18, 2023. On the Billboard Global 200, the song peaked at number 128. On May 16, 2023, the single was certified platinum by RIAA, and by BPI. They performed "Sex, Drugs, Etc." on Jimmy Kimmel Live! on November 28, 2022.

On August 12, 2022, Beach Weather released their first single in six years, "Unlovable", with a music video for it released on September 14, 2022. On November 11, 2022, the band released the single and music video for "Trouble With This Bed". On January 20, 2023, Beach Weather released the promotional single "Homebody" along with a music video. On February 17, 2023, the song "Hard Feelings" was released for streaming. Their debut full-length studio album Pineapple Sunrise, was released on March 3, 2023, via last nite/Arista Records. On May 18, 2023, the fourth and final single, "Pineapple Sunrise" was released along with its music video.

On January 11, 2023, the band was nominated Best New Artist (Alternative & Rock) at 2023 iHeartRadio Music Awards. On January 14, 2023, Beach Weather played at iHeartRadio ALTer EGO sharing the stage with Red Hot Chili Peppers, Muse and Fall Out Boy among others. On May 26, 2023, a 6-tracks EP containing stripped down versions of songs from Pineapple Sunrise titled Pineapple Sunset was released.

In support of the album, the band embarked on a headlining, Pineapple Sunrise: The Tour, in Canada and the United States from March to May 2023. In May–June 2023, Beach Weather joined lovelytheband on their If We're Being Honest tour, and appear on such summer and fall music festivals as BottleRock Napa Valley, Hangout Music Festival, Shaky Knees Music Festival, Summerfest, Life Is Beautiful Music & Art Festival, and others. In June 2023, Beach Weather released a new version of "Unlovable" featuring Pale Waves. In October–November 2023, the band supported The Beaches on the Blame My Ex Tour in Canada. In November 2023, Beach Weather was featured on a new version of "Thoughts I Have While Lying in Bed" by the Maine. In April 2024, the group embarked on a West Coast leg for their Pineapple Sunrise tour.

=== 2024–2025: Melt ===
On May 31, the group released the single, "High in Low Places" as the lead single from their second studio album. On July 19, the band released "Hottest Summer on Record" as the second single from the album. Then on August 23, they released the single "Hardcore Romance" along with the announcement that their sophomore album, Melt, would be released on October 25. In support of the album, the group embarked on the Will Make You... Melt tour, with dates running in the US and UK. On December 13, the group released the promotional track, "Seth Cohen".

On March 29, 2025, the group announced the deluxe edition of their second album under the name Melt'd, which was released on May 30. Along with this announcement, they released a remix of "Hardcore Romance" featuring Ari Abdul. A remix to "Fake Nice" was also released on April 25, featuring Kevin Kaarl. The group joined Pierce the Veil on their headlining I Can't Hear You tour in May 2025.

=== 2026–present: Upcoming third album ===
On October 2, 2026, the group released "New Aesthetic", the lead single from their upcoming third album, slated for release in 2027. They will also embark on a fall tour in the US, from October to November, and make an appearance at 8123 Festival in January 2027.

== Band members ==
Current

- Nick Santino – lead vocals, rhythm guitar (2015–2017, 2022–present)
- Reeve Powers – bass, backing vocals (2015–2017, 2022–present)
- Sean Silverman – lead guitar (2022–present)

Touring

- Alex Silverman – keyboard (2022–present)
- Ryan Gose – drums (2024–present)

Former

- Ian Holubiak – lead guitar (2015)
- Austin Scates – drums (2015–2017)
- Jeremy Wolda – drums (2022–2023)

== Discography ==
=== Studio albums ===
List of studio albums, with selected chart positions
Title	Album details	Peak chart positions
Title	Album details	US Heat
Pineapple Sunrise	Released: March 3, 2023; Label: 8123, last nite/Arista Records; Format: CD, digital download, LP, streaming	21
Melt	Released: October 25, 2024; Label: 8123, last nite/Arista Records; Formats: CD, digital download, LP, streaming	—

=== Extended plays ===
List of extended plays with selected details
Title	Album details
What a Drag	Released: August 28, 2015; Label: 8123; Format: CD, digital download, streaming; Track listing: 1. "Wolf"; 2. "New Skin"; 3. "Bad Seed"; 4. "Swoon"; 5. "Revel Sun"
Chit Chat	Released: November 4, 2016; Label: 8123; Format: CD, digital download, streaming
Basement Sessions	Released: July 14, 2017; Label: 8123; Format: Digital download, streaming
Pineapple Sunset	Released: May 26, 2023; Label: 8123, last nite/Arista Records; Format: Digital download, streaming

=== Singles ===
==== As lead artist ====
List of singles as lead artist, with selected chart positions and certifications
Title	Year	Peak chart positions										Certifications	Album
Title	Year	US Bub.	US Alt.	CAN	CZE	GER	GRE	IRE	POR	SVK	UK	Certifications	Album
"Wolf"	2015	—	—	—	—	—	—	—	—	—	—		What a Drag
"Someone's Disaster"	2016	—	—	—	—	—	—	—	—	—	—		Chit Chat
"Chit Chat"	2016	—	—	—	—	—	—	—	—	—	—		Chit Chat
"Sex, Drugs, Etc."	2022	1	1	62	— (Note: "Sex, Drugs, Etc." did not enter the Czech Radio Singles Top 100 chart, but peaked at number 29 on the Czech Singles Digital Top 100 chart.)	17	21	45	88	28	46	RIAA: 2× Platinum; AFP: Gold; BPI: Platinum; BVMI: Gold; IFPI Greece: Platinum; MC: 2× Platinum	Chit Chat and Pineapple Sunrise
"Unlovable" (solo or featuring Pale Waves)	2022	—	11	—	7	—	—	—	—	—	—		Pineapple Sunrise
"Trouble with This Bed"	2022	—	—	—	—	—	—	—	—	—	—		Pineapple Sunrise
"Pineapple Sunrise"	2023	—	—	—	55	—	—	—	—	—	—		Pineapple Sunrise
"High in Low Places"	2024	—	15	—	—	—	—	—	—	—	—		Melt
"Hottest Summer on Record"	2024	—	—	—	—	—	—	—	—	—	—		Melt
"Hardcore Romance"	2024	—	—	—	51	—	—	—	—	—	—		Melt
"Deadbeat Blue" (featuring Bel)	2024	—	—	—	—	—	—	—	—	—	—		Melt
"Fake Nice"	2024	—	—	—	—	—	—	—	—	—	—		Melt
"New Aesthetic"	2026	—	40	—	—	—	—	—	—	—	—		TBA
"—" denotes a single that did not chart or was not released in that territory.

==== As featured artist ====
List of singles as featured artist, with selected chart positions
Title	Year	Peak chart positions	Albums
Title	Year	US Alt.	Albums
"Thoughts I Have While Lying in Bed" (The Maine featuring Beach Weather)	2023	23	The Maine
"—" denotes a recording that did not chart or was not released in that territory.

=== Promotional singles ===
List of promotional singles
Title	Year	Album
"Homebody"	2023	Pineapple Sunrise
"Hard Feelings"	2023	Pineapple Sunrise
"Seth Cohen"	2024	Non-album single

=== Music videos ===
List of music videos, showing year released and director
Title	Year	Director(s)
"New Skin"	2016	Alexa San Román
"Swoon"	2016	
"Chit Chat"	2016	Alexa San Román
"Unlovable"	2022	Alexa San Román
"Sex, Drugs, Etc."	2022	Kirt Barnett
"Trouble With This Bed"	2022	Kirt Barnett
"Homebody"	2023	Guadalupe Bustos
"Hard Feelings"	2023	Alexa San Román
"Pineapple Sunrise"	2023	Chad Suter
"High in Low Places"	2024	Beewax
"Hardcore Romance"	2024	Alexa San Román
"Fake Nice"	2024	Chad Suter

== Awards and nominations ==
=== iHeartRadio Music Awards ===
Year	Nominee / work	Award	Result
2023	Beach Weather	Best New Artist (Alternative & Rock)	Nominated
