= 2007 EP =

Debut EP by This Century

EP by This Century
- Released: October 5, 2007
- Genre: Pop rock
- Length: 20:05

This Century chronology
2007 EP (2007)	Look What We Made EP (2008)

2007 EP is the debut EP from Phoenix, Arizona pop rock band This Century. It was released on October 5, 2007, and contains 6 tracks.

== Track listing ==
No.	Title	Length
1.	"In Progress"	2:33
2.	"Doublespeak"	3:16
3.	"Tragedy"	3:30
4.	"What Are We"	3:52
5.	"Shifting of Guards"	3:51
6.	"A Need For Charity"	3:03
Total length:		20:05

== Personnel ==
Members

- Joel Kanitz – Vocals
- Sean Silverman – Guitar
- Alex Silverman – Bass, keyboard
- Ryan Gose – Drums
