= Sex, Drugs, Etc. =

- Sped up version cover art

Single by Beach Weather

from the album Pineapple Sunrise
- Released: August 1, 2022
- Length: 3:16
- Label: 8123; last nite/Arista Records
- Songwriters: Nick Santino; Alex Silverman; Sean Silverman; Austin Scates
- Producers: Alex Silverman; Sean Silverman

Beach Weather singles chronology
"Chit Chat" (2016)	"Sex, Drugs, Etc." (2022)	"Unlovable" (2022)

Music video
- "Sex, Drugs, Etc." on YouTube

"Sex, Drugs, Etc." is a song by American rock band Beach Weather. It was released on August 1, 2022, as the lead single from their debut studio album, Pineapple Sunrise. First released in 2016 from their EP, Chit Chat, the song began going viral via social media in early 2022, leading to its servicing to radio and eventual chart run. The song topped the Billboard Alternative Airplay chart and was certified platinum by the Recording Industry Association of America in 2023.

The song was written by Nick Santino, Alex and Sean Silverman, and Austin Scates. The band released both a stripped down and a sped up version of the track in December 2022.

== Background ==
"Sex, Drugs, Etc." was originally released in 2016, from their second EP Chit Chat. The song was almost cut from the EP, "because it isn't a very happy song." According to vocalist Nick Santino, the band were "worried" that people wouldn't resonate with the song. In 2020, the song was featured on the Mexican teen drama TV series, Control Z, stirring up initial buzz. In early 2022, the song began going viral on TikTok, leading to the group's re-release of the song as a single, following their five-year hiatus. The song was serviced to alternative radio on August 1, 2022.

Speaking about the song's virality and its meaning, Santino stated, "We never thought 'Sex, Drugs, Etc.' would be the song people gravitate to. I can relate to the meaning of it personally. It's about having anxiety. I don't really go out. I'm not a big party guy. I'm the opposite; I'm a homebody. It's amazing to see a lot of listeners identify with it."

On November 28, 2022, the group performed the song on Jimmy Kimmel Live!.

== Composition ==
"Sex, Drugs, Etc." was written by Nick Santino, Alex and Sean Silverman and Austin Scates, while production was handled by Alex and Sean Silverman. Musically, the song features palm-muted guitars, handclaps and a "swooning windswept harmony" with the chorus singing: "I don't need that late night high. I'm floating on my vibe."

== Chart performance ==
"Sex, Drugs, Etc." topped the Billboard Alternative Airplay chart on the week of October 29, 2022. The song also reached the Hot Rock & Alternative Songs and Rock Airplay chart at number 17 and number six, respectively. On the US Bubbling Under Hot 100 Singles chart, the song peaked at number one. On the Billboard Alternative Airplay 2022 year-end chart, the song was ranked at number 38. The song was also ranked at the same position on the Hot Rock & Alternative Songs 2022 year-end chart. On the Billboard Alternative Airplay 2023 year-end chart, the song was ranked at number three. The song was also ranked at the 43 on the Hot Rock & Alternative Songs and number five on the Rock Airplay 2023 year-end charts. In October 2023, Billboard ranked the song at number 81 on its list of the 100 most successful songs of the Alternative Airplay chart.

Internationally, the song reached within the top 50 in the Czech Republic, Ireland and the UK, as well as the top 100 in Canada, Portugal, Slovakia and Sweden.

== Music video ==
The music video for "Sex, Drugs, Etc." premiered via YouTube on September 27, 2022, and was directed by Kirt Barnett.

== Track listing ==
Digital download
No.	Title	Length
1.	"Sex, Drugs, Etc."	3:16

Digital download – acoustic
No.	Title	Length
1.	"Sex, Drugs, Etc." (stripped down)	3:21

Digital download – sped up
No.	Title	Length
1.	"Sex, Drugs, Etc." (sped up version)	2:56

== Personnel ==
Credits for "Sex, Drugs, Etc." per Pineapple Sunrise booklet.

Beach Weather

- Nick Santino – vocals, rhythm guitar
- Sean Silverman – lead guitar, keyboards
- Reeve Powers – bass
- Austin Scates – drums

Additional musicians

- Alex Silverman – keyboards, bass

Production

- Alex Silverman – producer, mixing, recording
- Sean Silverman – producer, recording
- Nick Santino – additional producer
- Dan Coutant – mastering

== Charts ==
=== Weekly charts ===
Weekly chart performance for "Sex, Drugs, Etc."
Chart (2022–2023)	Peak position
Canada (Canadian Hot 100)	62
Canada Rock (Billboard)	10
Czech Republic Singles Digital (ČNS IFPI)	29
Germany Trending Singles (Official German Charts)	17
Global 200 (Billboard)	128
Greece International (IFPI)	21
Ireland (IRMA)	45
Portugal (AFP)	88
Slovakia Singles Digital (ČNS IFPI)	75
Sweden (Sverigetopplistan)	97
UK Singles (Official Charts)	46
US Bubbling Under Hot 100 Singles (Billboard)	1
US Hot Rock & Alternative Songs (Billboard)	17
US Rock Airplay (Billboard)	6

=== Year-end charts ===
2022 year-end chart performance for "Sex, Drugs, Etc."
Chart (2022)	Position
US Hot Rock & Alternative Songs (Billboard)	38

2023 year-end chart performance for "Sex, Drugs, Etc."
Chart (2023)	Position
US Hot Rock & Alternative Songs (Billboard)	43
US Rock Airplay (Billboard)	5

== Certifications ==
Certifications for sales for "Sex, Drugs, Etc."
Region	Certification	Certified units/sales
Canada (Music Canada)	2× Platinum	160,000^{‡}
Denmark (IFPI Danmark)	Gold	45,000^{‡}
France (SNEP)	Platinum	200,000^{‡}
Germany (BVMI)	Gold	300,000^{‡}
Italy (FIMI)	Gold	50,000^{‡}
New Zealand (RMNZ)	2× Platinum	60,000^{‡}
Poland (ZPAV)	2× Platinum	100,000^{‡}
Portugal (AFP)	Gold	5,000^{‡}
Spain (Promusicae)	Gold	30,000^{‡}
United Kingdom (BPI)	Platinum	600,000^{‡}
United States (RIAA)	2× Platinum	2,000,000^{‡}
Streaming
Greece (IFPI Greece)	Platinum	2,000,000^{†}
^{‡} Sales+streaming figures based on certification alone.^{†} Streaming-only figures based on certification alone.

== Release history ==
Release dates and formats for "Sex, Drugs, Etc."
Region	Date	Format	Version	Label	Ref.
United States	August 1, 2022	Alternative radio	Original	8123; last nite/Arista Records	
Italy	November 24, 2022	Contemporary hit radio	Original	Sony	
Various	December 2, 2022	Digital download	Acoustic	8123; last nite/Arista Records	
Various	December 16, 2022	Digital download	Sped Up Version	8123; last nite/Arista Records	
