= Hopeful Romantic Sampler =

EP by This Century
- Released: July 12, 2010
- Genre: Pop rock
- Length: 8:52
- Label: Sire Records

This Century chronology
Kiss Me Like It's Christmas (2009)	Hopeful Romantic Sampler (2010)	Sound of Fire (2011)

The Hopeful Romantic Sampler is a three track EP released by American pop rock band This Century.

== Track listing ==
No.	Title	Length
1.	"Hopeful Romantic"	2:54
2.	"Young Love"	3:38
3.	"No Way Out"	2:26
Total length:		8:52

Track information

== Personnel ==
Members

- Joel Kanitz – Vocals
- Sean Silverman – Guitar
- Alex Silverman – Bass, keyboard
- Ryan Gose – Drums
