= Pineapple Sunrise =

Studio album by Beach Weather
- Released: March 3, 2023
- Recorded: June 2021
- Genre: Alternative rock
- Length: 32:00
- Label: 8123; last nite/Arista
- Producer: Alex Silverman; Sean Silverman

Beach Weather chronology
Basement Sessions (2017)	Pineapple Sunrise (2023)	Pineapple Sunset (2023)

Singles from Pineapple Sunrise
- 1. "Sex, Drugs, Etc." Released: August 1, 2022; 2. "Unlovable" Released: August 12, 2022; 3. "Trouble with This Bed" Released: November 11, 2022; 4. "Pineapple Sunrise" Released: May 18, 2023

Pineapple Sunrise is the debut studio album by American rock band Beach Weather. The album was released on March 3, 2023, via 8123 and last nite/Arista Records. The album contains the platinum-selling single, "Sex, Drugs, Etc.", as well as three other singles, "Unlovable", "Trouble with This Bed" and "Pineapple Sunrise".

== Background and composition ==
Nick Santino stated that the album "is the product of going almost 4 years without writing a single song." According to Santino, the band spent months in isolation and the album has themes of "melancholy and loneliness while also feeling hopeful and optimistic for what's ahead." He also added how the concept of the album "is rooted in the search for eternal happiness, mindfulness and being content with discovering and loving your inner self." The name Pineapple Sunrise, came from "a spiritual awakening" and refers to experessing personal change and growth. He also stated that the album was inspired by "inner dialogue." The album artwork was created by Rich Raun and symbolizes personal growth and healing.

During the writing of Pineapple Sunrise, the band members were all living in different states and were sharing voice memos, titles and any ideas that circled. The group wrote the album over FaceTime and recorded it together in six days in June 2021. They flew out to Phoenix, Arizona, to record the album. It contains eleven tracks, some tracks "more peaceful in spirit" and others "more self deprecating and come from a place of inner struggle." Sean Silverman revealed that "Unlovable" was the easiest track to put together, however, felt that "High & Driving" was the hardest one, having ten different versions of the song. Silverman also handled production on the album along with his brother, Alex. Two tracks from the album are interludes, "Desert Oasis" and "Miss You", which were described as "love letters" by Santino. The song "Silent Type" is described as an "autobiographical song" about where Santino came from. According to Silverman, "Wildfire" was written "later in the process" of composing the album, and he called the track "more sentimental" and "different" from the rest of the record.

== Release and promotion ==
"Sex, Drugs, Etc." was released as the lead single from the album on August 1, 2022. Originally released in 2016, from their second EP Chit Chat, the song soon picked up buzz in early 2022 after going viral on TikTok. This led to the song being serviced to radio and reached number one on the Billboard Alternative Airplay chart. "Unlovable" was released on August 12, as the album's second single. The song peaked at number 11 on the Billboard Alternative Airplay chart. On November 11, they released "Trouble with This Bed" as the third single from the album, along with its music video. In January and February 2023, the group released two promotional singles for streaming, "Homebody" and "Hard Feelings", ahead of the release of Pineapple Sunrise. The album was officially released on March 3, 2023. "Pineapple Sunrise" was released as the fourth and final single from the album on May 18, as well as premiering its music video. The song peaked at number 55 on the Czech Singles Chart.

In support of the album, the band embarked on a headlining, Pineapple Sunrise: The Tour, in Canada and the United States from March to May 2023. The group also opened for Lovelytheband on their If We're Being Honest tour in June. They supported The Beaches on their Blame My Ex tour from May to November 2023. In April 2024, the group embarked on a West Coast leg for their Pineapple Sunrise tour.

== Critical reception ==
Professional ratings
Review scores
Source	Rating
idobi Radio	A
Sputnikmusic	1.5/5

Pineapple Sunrise was met with mixed to positive reviews from music critics. Sam DeVotta of idobi Radio gave the album a positive review stating, "each song on Pineapple Sunrise has its own distinctive sound while still managing to feel like Beach Weather... There's an overall vulnerability to Pineapple Sunrise illustrated by recurring themes of anxiety, self-consciousness, and navigating relationships." The Honey Pop remarked, "The best way we can describe the album is that it sounds like we lived life on 35mm film." Jesper of Sputnikmusic gave a negative review for the album, feeling like there was a lack of "passion" and called the record, "an outdated, underwritten and poorly produced attempt to capitalise on a viral moment that has, in internet time, long since passed."

== Track listing ==
All tracks are written by Alex Silverman, Austin Scates, Nick Santino, Reeve Powers and Sean Silverman, except where noted.

No.	Title	Writer(s)	Length
1.	"Pineapple Sunrise"		2:56
2.	"High & Driving"		3:00
3.	"Unlovable"		3:30
4.	"Trouble with This Bed"		3:46
5.	"Desert Oasis"		0:46
6.	"Homebody"		2:49
7.	"Hard Feelings"		2:54
8.	"Silent Type"		3:29
9.	"Miss You"		1:01
10.	"Wildfire"		4:07
11.	"Sex, Drugs, Etc."	Alex Silverman, Austin Scates, Nick Santino and Sean Silverman	3:16
Total length:			32:00

== Personnel ==
Credits adapted from album's liner notes.

Beach Weather

- Nick Santino – vocals, rhythm guitar
- Sean Silverman – lead guitar, keyboards (track 11)
- Reeve Powers – bass, backing vocals, keyboards (track 3, 11)
- Austin Scates – drums (track 3, 11)

Additional musicians

- Alex Silverman – backing vocals, keyboards (track 3, 11), bass (track 11)

Production

- Alex Silverman – producer, engineering
- Sean Silverman – producer
- Reeve Powers – vocal coach
- Austin Scates – co-producer (track 3, 11)
- Nick Santino – co-producer
- Dan Coutant – engineering (track 11)
- Randy Merrill – engineering (track 1–10)
- Matt Malpass – engineering, mixing

== Charts ==
Chart performance for Pineapple Sunrise
Chart (2023)	Peak position
US Heatseekers Albums (Billboard)	21

== Certifications and sales ==
Certifications for Pineapple Sunrise
Region	Certification	Certified units/sales
Poland (ZPAV)	Gold	10,000^{‡}
^{‡} Sales+streaming figures based on certification alone.

== Release history ==
Release dates and formats for Pineapple Sunrise
Region	Date	Format(s)	Label	Ref.
Various	March 3, 2023	Digital download; streaming	last nite/Arista	
United States	March 3, 2023	CD	8123	
United States	March 3, 2023	LP	8123	
