= No Way Out Digital Sampler =

No Way Out

EP by This Century
- Released: March 10, 2009
- Genre: Pop rock
- Length: 10:05

This Century chronology
Look What We Made EP (2008)	No Way Out (2009)	To Love and Back EP (2009)

The No Way Out Digital Sampler is a three-track EP that was released on March 10, 2009, by Phoenix, Arizona pop rock band This Century.

== Track listing ==
No.	Title	Length
1.	"No Way Out"	2:24
2.	"Hard To Get"	3:30
3.	"Want You (Remix)"	3:11
Total length:		9:05

== Personnel ==
Members

- Joel Kanitz – Vocals
- Sean Silverman – Guitar
- Alex Silverman – Bass, keyboard
- Ryan Gose – Drums
