= Sound of Fire =

Studio album by This Century
- Released: April 19, 2011
- Recorded: 2010–11
- Genre: Pop rock
- Length: 24:08
- Label: Action Theory Records
- Producer: Tim Pagnotta

This Century chronology
Hopeful Romantic Sampler (2010)	Sound of Fire (2011)	Acoustics (2012)

Sound of Fire is the debut studio album by American pop rock band This Century, released on April 19, 2011 on Action Theory Records. It spawned one single and music video for the title track "Sound of Fire".

== Track listing ==
No.	Title	Length
1.	"Young and Useless"	2:56
2.	"Sound of Fire"	2:56
3.	"Hopeful Romantic"	2:54
4.	"Everywhere Everything"	3:11
5.	"Money Honey"	3:24
6.	"To Love and Back"	2:45
7.	"Do It to Me"	3:19
8.	"Loud"	2:38
Total length:		24:03

== Personnel ==
Members

- Joel Kanitz – Vocals
- Sean Silverman – Guitar
- Alex Silverman – Bass, keyboard
- Ryan Gose – Drums

Production

- Tim Pagnotta – Producer
- Carlos De La Garza – Engineer
- Brandon Belsky – Additional Engineer
- Kyle Black – Additional Engineer
- Mark Needham – Mixer
- Justin Smith – Master
- Tanner Radcliffe – Artist Management
- Tim Kirch – Artist Management
- Joel Kanitz – Art Direction and Design
- Dirk Mai – Photography
