= Wild & Free (album) =

Studio album by A Rocket to the Moon
- Released: March 26, 2013
- Recorded: 2012–2013
- Genres: Country; pop rock; indie rock
- Length: 43:54
- Label: Fueled By Ramen
- Producer: Mark Bright

A Rocket to the Moon chronology
That Old Feeling (2012)	Wild & Free (2013)

Singles from Wild & Free
- 1. "Whole Lotta You" Released: August 21, 2012; 2. "Ever Enough" Released: November 27, 2012

Wild & Free is the third and final studio album by indie rock band A Rocket to the Moon. It was released on March 26, 2013, via Fueled By Ramen. The album peaked at number 136 on the Billboard 200.

== Background ==
In December 2011, Nick Santino announced that the band would begin recording their second studio album in January 2012. The group recorded the album at Starstruck Studios in Nashville, Tennessee and they worked with producer Mark Bright.

"We've spent the last three years trying to out do ourselves. We've toured around the world, made friends, and written tons of songs along the way... we'll be recording our second album with legendary producer Mark Bright. We are excited, and we hope you are, too. We've grown and matured as people and musicians over the last three years, and we're happy that you have grown with us. The songs we've written for this album hold a special place in our hearts, and we hope they'll do the same for you."

In June 2012, the group revealed the title of the album, Wild & Free. In October 2012, the band embarked on the That Old Feeling tour in support of the upcoming album. In February 2013, the band released the album artwork for Wild & Free.

On May 9, 2013, A Rocket to the Moon announced that the band would be breaking up following their tour with the Maine. They embarked on their last tour, the One Last Night Tour, in August 2013. They also performed one last show at the Bazooka Rocks II Music Festival in the Philippines on August 25, before breaking up.

== Composition ==
The album was influenced by Johnny Cash and Tom Petty and the Heartbreakers. According to drummer Andrew Cook, the album's sound was influenced by country music, pop, classic rock and punk rock. Santino stated, when he wrote the songs with guitarist Justin Richards, the writing was also influenced by country music. He also felt that recording this album was less stressful compared to their previous album, On Your Side. The album was written about the past and the future, according to Santino. The album consists of 13 tracks and each one was recorded 30 times, "just to get a good take." The band would then "clean up some of the guitar parts, go back and re-do some of that stuff," before layering the vocals on top. The group finished recording the album in February 2012, however, in need for another song for the record, they headed back into the studio to record a single.

Santino spoke with Alternative Press about some tracks from the album. "Lost and Found" is described as a piano ballad and is about needing "to get lost before you get found," a theme the band has never written about prior, according to Santino. One of the more darker songs from the album, "Another Set Of Wings" is about "losing somebody that you're in love with, or really close to." They wrote the song with Stephen Barker Liles of Love and Theft, which was written in Stephen's bedroom and features guest vocals from Liz Huett.

== Release ==
On July 3, 2012, "Going Out" was made available for streaming and was released as the album's first promotional single. On August 13, "Whole Lotta You" was released for streaming, before it was officially released as the album's lead single on August 21. "You're My Song" was streamed via Alternative Press on September 28. In anticipation of releasing Wild & Free, the group released an EP titled, That Old Feeling on October 2. On November 27, "Ever Enough" was released as the second single from the album. According to Santino, it took "forever to get a release date" for the album, stemming from issues with the label. It was supposed to be released in August 2012, before the album was pushed back to September, then October, then January. They were eventually given a release date for March 2013. The album was streamed exclusively via Billboard on March 19, 2013. It was officially released on March 26.

== Critical reception ==
Professional ratings
Review scores
Source	Rating
AllMusic	4/5 stars
idobi Radio	3.5/5 stars
Sputnikmusic	2.5/5

The album was met with positive reviews from music critics. Matt Collar of AllMusic stated, "A Rocket to the Moon's new country sound on Wild & Free is an immediately likable one, and in the band's own low-key way, shows a fresh new approach for the band's musical direction." Marina Oliver of idobi Radio remarked, "Whether listeners vibe with the turn that A Rocket To The Moon have taken toward a pop impression on light country or prefer their youthful musings without a side of the South, the old sweetness of the band still sits evident just below the surface." Will R. of Sputnikmusic noted, "Sure, it's catchy as hell, and in true A Rocket To The Moon fashion the album's main draw is how damn easy the whole thing is. It slides in one ear and right out the other like cream soda, super sweet and not all that nutritious."

== Track listing ==
All tracks are written by A Rocket to the Moon (Nick Santino, Justin Richards, Eric Halvorsen, Andrew Cook), except where noted.

Standard edition
No.	Title	Writer(s)	Length
1.	"Going Out"		3:32
2.	"First Kiss"		3:14
3.	"Whole Lotta You"	Santino, Richards, Halvorsen, Cook, J.T. Harding, Kevin Griffin	2:57
4.	"Ever Enough"	Santino, Richards, Halvorsen, Cook, Josh Jenkins	3:07
5.	"If I'm Gonna Fall in Love"		3:27
6.	"I Do"	Santino, Richards, Halvorsen, Cook, Danny Orton, Jenn Schott	3:28
7.	"Another Set of Wings"	Santino, Richards, Halvorsen, Cook, Stephen Barker Liles	3:15
8.	"Wild & Free"	Santino, Richards, Halvorsen, Cook, Bobby Huff	3:09
9.	"Wherever You Go"		3:20
10.	"Nothing At All"		3:27
11.	"Somebody Out There"	Robert Ellis Orrall	3:29
12.	"You're My Song"	Santino, Richards, Halvorsen, Cook, Griffin	2:56
13.	"Lost and Found"	Santino, Richards, Halvorsen, Cook, Jason Reeves	4:30
Total length:			43:54

Deluxe Edition Bonus Tracks
No.	Title	Writer(s)	Length
14.	"Whole Lotta You" (acoustic)	Santino, Richards, Halvorsen, Cook, Harding, Griffin	3:00
15.	"Ever Enough" (acoustic)	Santino, Richards, Halvorsen, Cook, Jenkins	3:12
16.	"Call It All Home"		3:59
17.	"While the World Let Go"		3:40

== Personnel ==
Credits adapted from album's liner notes and Tidal

A Rocket to the Moon

- Nick Santino – lead vocals, guitar; art direction, design
- Justin Richards – guitar, vocals
- Eric Halvorsen – bass, vocals
- Andrew Cook – drums

Additional musicians

- Mike Johnson – steel guitar (2, 4, 6, 9); dobro (11)
- Charlie Judge – B3 organ (3); farfisa organ, synthesizer (8)
- Aubrey Haynie – fiddle (11)
- Liz Huett – additional vocals (3, 7, 8)
- Josh Jenkins – additional vocals, songwriting (4)
- Stephen Barker Liles – additional vocals, songwriting (7)

Production

- Mark Bright – production, recording engineer
- Todd Tidwell – recording engineer
- Shawn Daugherty – assistant recording engineer
- Chris Smalls – digital audio editing
- Tony Stanhope – assistant engineer
- Derek Bason – mixing
- Chris Ashburn – assistant mixing engineer
- Adam Ayan – mastering
- Rob Gold – art manager
- Scarecrowoven – art direction, design
- Eric Ryan Anderson – photography
- Josh Skubel – packaging production

== Charts ==
Chart performance for Wild & Free
Chart (2013)	Peak position
US Billboard 200	136
US Top Alternative Albums (Billboard)	24
US Top Rock Albums (Billboard)	38
