= To Love and Back EP =

To Love and Back

EP by This Century
- Released: June 12, 2009
- Genre: Pop rock
- Length: 16:53
- Label: Action Theory Records

This Century chronology
No Way Out Digital Sampler (2009)	To Love and Back (2009)	Kiss Me Like It's Christmas (2009)

To Love and Back EP is a six-track EP that was released on Action Theory Records on June 12, 2009, by This Century, a pop rock band from Phoenix, Arizona.

== Track listing ==
No.	Title	Length
1.	"Battling A Heavy Heart"	2:47
2.	"To Love and Back"	2:46
3.	"Running"	3:41
4.	"No Way Out"	2:27
5.	"Go Get Her"	2:18
6.	"So Cruel"	2:54
Total length:		16:53

Track information

== Personnel ==
Members

- Joel Kanitz – vocals
- Sean Silverman – lead guitar
- Alex Silverman – bass guitar, keyboard
- Ryan Gose – drums
