= On Your Side (A Rocket to the Moon album) =

Studio album by A Rocket to the Moon
- Released: October 13, 2009
- Recorded: February–March 2009
- Studio: The Lair Recording Studio, Los Angeles, California
- Genre: Emo pop; pop rock
- Length: 38:21
- Label: Fueled by Ramen
- Producer: Matt Squire

A Rocket to the Moon chronology
Greetings From... (2008)	On Your Side (2009)	Wild & Free (2013)

Singles from On Your Side
- 1. "Mr. Right" Released: September 15, 2009; 2. "Like We Used To" Released: June 15, 2010

On Your Side is the second studio album by American rock band A Rocket to the Moon, released on October 13, 2009. The album debuted at number 82 on the Billboard 200. "Mr. Right" and "Like We Used To" were released as singles in promotion of the album.

== Composition ==
On Your Side was produced by Matt Squire and was recorded at The Lair Recording Studio in Los Angeles, California. The album was recorded from February to March 2009. Vocalist Nick Santino spoke with Alternative Press about the tracks from the album. Many tracks from the album were written about love, including, "She's Killing Me", "Dakota", "Baby Blue Eyes" and "Mr. Right". Santino stated that the subject was "easy" to write about. The first track "Annabelle" is described as "an energetic song" and is about "a girl who is all about herself and not about you at all." According to Santino, the song was inspired by "seeing girls treat their boyfriends like crap in public." "Life of the Party" is an 80s' dance pop track, about "a girl who loves the word 'love' and will do anything to tell people she is in it." Santino described "Give a Damn" as a 90s' sounding track and is about "your dream girl, but only if she knew you existed."

He wrote the final track, "On Your Side" on a plane flying home from Phoenix, Arizona. According to Santino, he had the line, "My love will always be on your side" in his head and decided to write it down in his notebook, before working it into a melody. The songs "On a Lonely Night" and "Sometimes" feature Caitlin Harnett and Brandon Wronski. "Like We Used To" was written in 45 minutes after the group performed a show in Michigan. They flew out to Los Angeles the following day to record it.

== Release ==
The album's lead single, "Mr. Right" was released on September 15, 2009. A music video was released in promotion of the single on November 11. A music video for "Like We Used To" was released on June 7, 2010. The song was released for radio airplay on June 15, as the second single from the album. A deluxe single for the song was released on October 19, for digital download. The song peaked at number 91 on the Billboard Hot 100. The group revealed the album artwork on August 31. The album was made available for streaming on October 8, before it was officially released on October 13.

== Promotion ==
In support of the album's release, the group joined Boys Like Girls, Cobra Starship, The Maine and VersaEmerge on a US tour from October to November 2009. The band also supported Sing It Loud, Motion City Soundtrack and Fun on a spring tour in April 2010. The group toured with Hanson on the Shout It Out Tour! in October 2010. They later joined Before You Exit on the My Small Package tour in December 2010. The band embarked on their first headlining tour, the On Your Side tour from March to April 2011, with support from Anarbor, Valencia, Runner Runner, and Go Radio.

== Critical reception ==
Professional ratings
Review scores
Source	Rating
AbsolutePunk.net	21%
AllMusic	3.5/5 stars
Alternative Addiction	3/5 stars
Alternative Press	3.5/5 stars
Melodic	3/5 stars

The album was met with mixed to positive reviews from music critics. Tim Sendra of AllMusic stated that the album "goes down very smoothly and is generic in a good way, in that it satisfies all the requirements of a successful emo pop album." He felt that the choruses were "easy to sing with" and vocals "angst-fueled but never whiny or gruff." He also added how some songs from the album could be "pop hits in the 1970s, if stripped of their modern sound." Alternative Addiction remarked, "Some of the songs are insanely catchy and you can appreciate the songwriting for what it is as well as some stellar production, instrumentation, and really vocals by Nick Santino," however, noted that the album had a lot of cliché's within the pop-punk genre.

Evan Lucy of Alternative Press stated, "finds Santino & Co. splitting time between life-of-the-party pop ('Mr. Right', the Def Leppard-esque 'Give A Damn') and tender heart-on-sleeve balladry ('On A Lonely Night', 'Baby Blue Eyes')." He compared the tracks, "Annabelle" and "She's Killing Me", to the likes of their peers in the same territory, the Maine and Brighten. Johan Wippsson of Melodic praised the album's "great melodies," but felt that they didn't stand out as "there are many other similar bands out there." A negative review came from Blake Solomon of AbsolutePunk, criticizing the record for having "no soul, no urgency and definitely no sustainability."

== Commercial performance ==
On Your Side debuted at number 82 on the Billboard 200. The album also reached number 23 and number 35 on the Top Alternative Albums and Top Rock Albums chart, respectively. As of March 2013, the album has sold 82,000 copies in the US, according to the Nielsen Soundscan.

== Track listing ==
All tracks are written by A Rocket to the Moon, except where noted.

No.	Title	Length
1.	"Annabelle" (A Rocket to the Moon, Matt Squire)	3:15
2.	"Mr. Right" (A Rocket to the Moon, Sam Hollander, Dave Katz)	3:07
3.	"She's Killing Me" (A Rocket to the Moon, Zac Maloy)	3:08
4.	"On a Lonely Night"	3:08
5.	"Dakota"	3:31
6.	"Life of the Party"	2:46
7.	"Like We Used To" (A Rocket to the Moon, Dan Young)	3:24
8.	"Where Did You Go?"	3:08
9.	"Sometimes"	2:53
10.	"Baby Blue Eyes"	3:40
11.	"Give a Damn"	3:25
12.	"On Your Side"	3:11
Total length:		38:21

Digital bonus tracks
No.	Title	Length
13.	"Like We Used To (Piano Version)"	4:18
14.	"No One, Will Ever Get Hurt"	3:07
15.	"When I'm Gone"	3:58
16.	"Sometimes (Alternate Version)"	3:04

== Personnel ==
Credits adapted from album's liner notes.

A Rocket to the Moon

- Nick Santino – vocals, guitar
- Justin Richards – guitar
- Eric Halvorsen – bass
- Andrew Cook – drums

Additional musicians

- Caitlin Harnett – vocals (on "On a Lonely Night")
- Brandon Wronski – vocals (on "Sometimes")

Production

- Matt Squire – producer, mixing
- Travis Huff – additional producer, engineering
- UE Nastasi – mastering (Sterling Sound, New York)

== Charts ==
Chart performance for On Your Side
Chart (2009)	Peak position
US Billboard 200	82
US Top Alternative Albums (Billboard)	23
US Top Rock Albums (Billboard)	35
