= A Rocket to the Moon =

American rock band

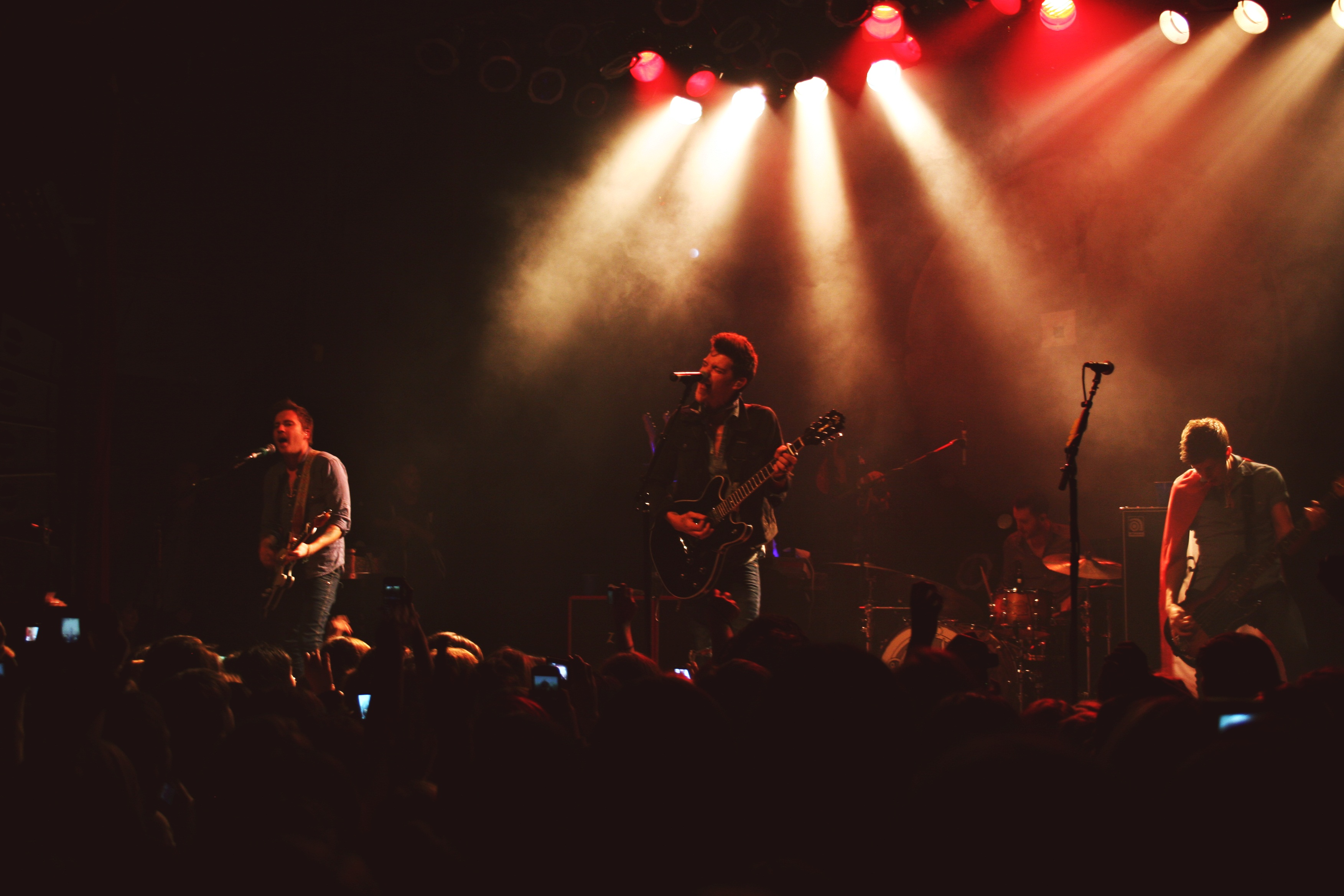
- A Rocket to the Moon performing in 2011

Background information
- Origin: Braintree, Massachusetts, United States
- Genres: Pop rock; alternative rock; emo pop; electronic (early)
- Years active: 2006–2013; 2017; 2019
- Labels: Fueled by Ramen (2008–2013) Decaydance (2008)
- Past members: Nick Santino; Justin Richards; Eric Halvorsen; Andrew Cook; Joe Cafano; Mike Cafano; Loren Brinton
- Website: www.arockettothemoon.net

A Rocket to the Moon (commonly abbreviated as ARTTM) was an American rock band formed during 2006 in Braintree, Massachusetts, United States, by Nick Santino, lead vocalist and rhythm guitarist. Guitarist and backup vocalist Justin Richards (also of Brighten), bassist and backup vocalist Eric Halvorsen, and drummer Andrew Cook eventually joined the band, forming the final member lineup. The band has released three albums overall, two through Fueled by Ramen. Their debut studio album, Your Best Idea, was released on December 26, 2006. Their second studio album, On Your Side, was released on October 13, 2009. Wild & Free was released as their third studio album on March 26, 2013. In 2013, the group split up, but returned for a one-off performance in 2017.

== History ==
=== Early years, Your Best Idea and Greetings From... (2006–2008) ===
Nick Santino started A Rocket to the Moon in the summer of 2006 as a solo project. He formerly fronted the local bands The Bad Year and The Midway Class. These bands weren't doing anything serious at the time and he decided to do his own thing instead. He created a MySpace page and the name A Rocket to the Moon came from when Santino was thinking of the display name for his page. Santino spent two years working as a one-man band, handling all the instruments himself. Your Best Idea was released as the debut studio album on December 26, 2006.

Santino assembled a band of musicians in early 2008 with the help of The Maine prior to A Rocket to the Moon's first major festival appearance, at The Bamboozle. They then appeared on the July 10, 2008 episode of Total Request Live, performing the song "Dakota". Their performance brought them attention from Pete Wentz, the bassist of Fall Out Boy. Contrary to popular belief, A Rocket to the Moon were never signed to Decaydance Records (Wentz's record label and then an imprint of Fueled by Ramen, now DCD2 Records). He had shown interest in signing the band and originally wanted to do a Fueled by Ramen/Decaydance co-deal. The Decaydance side of the deal did not pan out for unknown reasons. Santino later revealed that it was a business decision that failed and "it got in the wrong hands." An official announcement of the signing to Fueled by Ramen was made in August 2008. Separate tours supporting both The Cab and A Cursive Memory followed in the fall of 2008. They also toured with Cute Is What We Aim For, Secondhand Serenade, and Automatic Loveletter. On October 13, 2008, the band released their EP Greetings From..., produced by Matt Grabe. The record reached No. 21 on the Billboard Heatseekers Albums chart. The EP features the promotional singles, "Dakota" and "If Only They Knew". A music video for "If Only They Knew" was released on May 13, 2009. The song "Just Another One" features guest vocals from John O'Callaghan from The Maine and Justin Richards from Brighten.

=== On Your Side (2009–2011) ===
The band spent the first part of February and March 2009 in the studio with Matt Squire recording their second full-length album. Sponsored by Rockstar, they were the opening band on Alternative Press magazine's AP Tour 2009 with The Maine, Hit the Lights, Family Force 5, and 3OH!3. The group were also named as one of the "100 Bands You Need To Know" by Alternative Press in 2009. They played the May 3rd lineup of the 2009 Bamboozle festival in East Rutherford, New Jersey and played select dates on the 2009 Vans Warped Tour before touring with The Cab, Eye Alaska, The Summer Set, and My Favorite Highway on the What Happens in Vegas... Tour. While on Warped Tour, the band did many signings with the non-profit organization Music Saves Lives, where they met with fans who gained special access to the band by donating blood. Andrew Cook, formerly of prog-rock band The Receiving End of Sirens, was made a full-time member upon the release of the band's second full-length studio album, On Your Side. The album was officially released on October 13, 2009. The album peaked at number 82 on the Billboard 200. The group released a music video for the album's lead single, "Mr. Right" on November 10. In the fall of 2009, they supported Boys Like Girls along with VersaEmerge, The Maine, and Cobra Starship on their Love Drunk Tour.

They played on the Take Action Tour presented by Hot Topic with Mayday Parade, There for Tomorrow, Stereo Skyline, and We the Kings in early 2010. In spring 2010, A Rocket to the Moon toured with Motion City Soundtrack, Sing It Loud, and Fun. On June 15, 2010, the group released the album's second single, "Like We Used To". The song debuted at number 91 on the Billboard Hot 100, selling 22,000 copies in October 2010. The single was certified gold by the Recording Industry Association of America. They opened for Hanson on select dates on their Shout It Out! Tour. They also joined All Time Low, Before You Exit, and City (Comma) State on the My Small Package Tour in October 2010. On October 5, the group released an EP, The Rainy Day Sessions, re-recording four tracks from On Your Side: "Mr. Right", "Like We Used To", "Baby Blue Eyes" and "On a Lonely Night", with Larkin Poe.

In March 2011, A Rocket to the Moon went on their first headlining tour, the On Your Side Tour, with Anarbor, Valencia, Runner Runner, and Go Radio. In May 2011, the band toured the UK with Mayday Parade. They also toured Australia and Indonesia with Hey Monday. In fall, A Rocket to the Moon supported Never Shout Never on the Time Travel Tour along with Carter Hulsey and Fake Problems.

=== Wild & Free (2012–2013) ===
The group began recording their third studio album in January 2012, at Starstruck Studios in Nashville, Tennessee and they worked with producer Mark Bright. The band also released an album documentary, showcasing the group recording and talking about the album. In February 2012, A Rocket to the Moon had performed in the Philippines along with The Summer Set, Forever the Sickest Kids, The Ready Set, and A+ Dropouts called the LIV5, before going to Australia for the music festival, Soundwave. In June 2012, the group revealed the title of the album, Wild & Free.

On July 3, 2012, "Going Out" was made available for streaming and was released as the album's first promotional single. On August 13, "Whole Lotta You" was released for streaming, before it was officially released as the album's lead single on August 21. "You're My Song" was streamed via Alternative Press on September 28. The group released an EP titled, That Old Feeling on October 2, and embarked on the That Old Feeling tour. On November 27, "Ever Enough" was released as the second single from the album. A Rocket to the Moon released their third studio album, Wild & Free, on March 26, 2013. The album peaked at number 136 on Billboard 200.

On May 9, 2013, A Rocket to the Moon announced that the band would be breaking up following their tour with the Maine. Despite the difficult decision, the group "felt like it was the right one and the right time." Santino further explained the breakup in an interview with Alternative Press. He stated how the group had problems with the management and label, and how they struggled to get a release date for the album. They embarked on their last tour, the One Last Night Tour. They also performed one last show at the Bazooka Rocks II Music Festival in the Philippines on August 25, 2013, before breaking up.

=== Breakup and reunion (2013–2019) ===
After the band broke up, Nick Santino pursued an alternative rock/country solo career first under the name "Nick Santino and The Northern Wind" and later under his own name, and formed a pop rock band Beach Weather in 2015. Andrew Cook and Justin Richards have gone on to play drums and guitar (respectively) for country group Dan + Shay. In 2014, Eric Halvorsen joined dance-pop band, Cobra Starship.

On January 21, 2017, the band played a one-off reunion show at 8123 Fest. In November 2019, Santino and Richards reunited performing the song "Dakota".

== Musical styles and influences ==
A Rocket to the Moon is described as pop rock, alternative rock and emo pop. The band has cited influences from Contemporary Christian music, Rage Against the Machine, Boyz II Men and Tom Petty, while their sound is rooted in late-'90s alternative rock and pop-influenced sounds of emocore. During the group's earlier years, their sound featured more synthesizers and was described as electronic. According to Santino, he decided to stray away from the electronic sound on their EP, Greetings From..., because he felt that "so many people were trying to attempt it." On their second studio album, On Your Side, the sound is described as emo pop, pop rock, power pop and pop punk, drawing comparison to the likes of The Cab and The All-American Rejects. The group changed up their sound on their third studio album, Wild & Free. The album is described as country and pop rock. According to drummer Andrew Cook, the album's sound was influenced by country music, pop, classic rock and punk rock.

== Band members ==
Final lineup

- Nick Santino – lead vocals, rhythm guitar (2006–2013, 2017)
- Justin Richards – lead guitar, backing vocals (2009–2013, 2017)
- Eric Halvorsen – bass guitar, backing vocals (2008–2013, 2017)
- Andrew Cook – drums (2009–2013, 2017)

Former

- Joe Cafano – bass (2006–2007)
- Mike Cafano – drums (2006–2007)
- Loren Brinton – drums (2008–2009)

== Discography ==
=== Studio albums ===
List of studio albums, with selected chart positions and sales figures
Title	Album details	Peak chart positions			Sales
Title	Album details	US	US Alt.	US Rock	Sales
Your Best Idea	Released: December 26, 2006; Label: Self-released; Formats: Digital download	—	—	—	
On Your Side	Released: October 13, 2009; Label: Fueled by Ramen; Formats: CD, digital download, streaming	82	23	35	US: 82,000
Wild & Free	Released: March 26, 2013; Label: Fueled by Ramen; Formats: CD, digital download, streaming	136	24	38	
"—" denotes a recording that did not chart or was not released in that territory.

=== Compilation albums ===
List of compilation albums with selected details
Title	Details
Like We Used To - Best Of	Released: June 13, 2017; Label: Warner; Formats: Digital download, streaming

=== Extended plays ===
List of extended plays, with selected chart positions
Title	Album details	Peak chart positions
Title	Album details	US Heat
Summer 07	Released: August 16, 2007; Label: Self-released; Formats: CD, digital download	—
Greetings From...	Released: October 13, 2008; Label: Fueled by Ramen; Formats: CD, digital download	21
The Rainy Day Sessions	Released: October 5, 2010; Label: Fueled by Ramen; Formats: Digital download	—
That Old Feeling	Released: October 2, 2012; Label: Fueled by Ramen; Formats: Digital download	—
"—" denotes a recording that did not chart or was not released in that territory.

=== Singles ===
List of singles as lead artist, with selected chart positions and sales, showing year released and album name
Title	Year	Peak chart positions			Sales	Certifications	Album
Title	Year	US	US Heat	US Rock Dig.	Sales	Certifications	Album
"Fear of Flying"	2007	—	—	—			Summer 07
"Not a Second to Waste"	2009	—	—	—			Summer 07
"Mr. Right"	2009	—	—	—			On Your Side
"Like We Used To"	2010	91	6	6	US: 300,000	RIAA: Gold	On Your Side
"Whole Lotta You"	2012	—	—	—			Wild & Free
"Ever Enough"	2012	—	—	—			Wild & Free
"—" denotes a recording that did not chart or was not released in that territory.

=== Promotional singles ===
Title	Year	Album
"Dakota"	2008	Greetings From...
"If Only They Knew"	2009	Greetings From...
"Santa Claus Is Coming to Town"	2009	Non-album single
"Going Out"	2012	Wild & Free
"You're My Song"	2012	Wild & Free
"First Kiss"	2012	Wild & Free
