= Austin Gibbs =

American musician (born 1986)

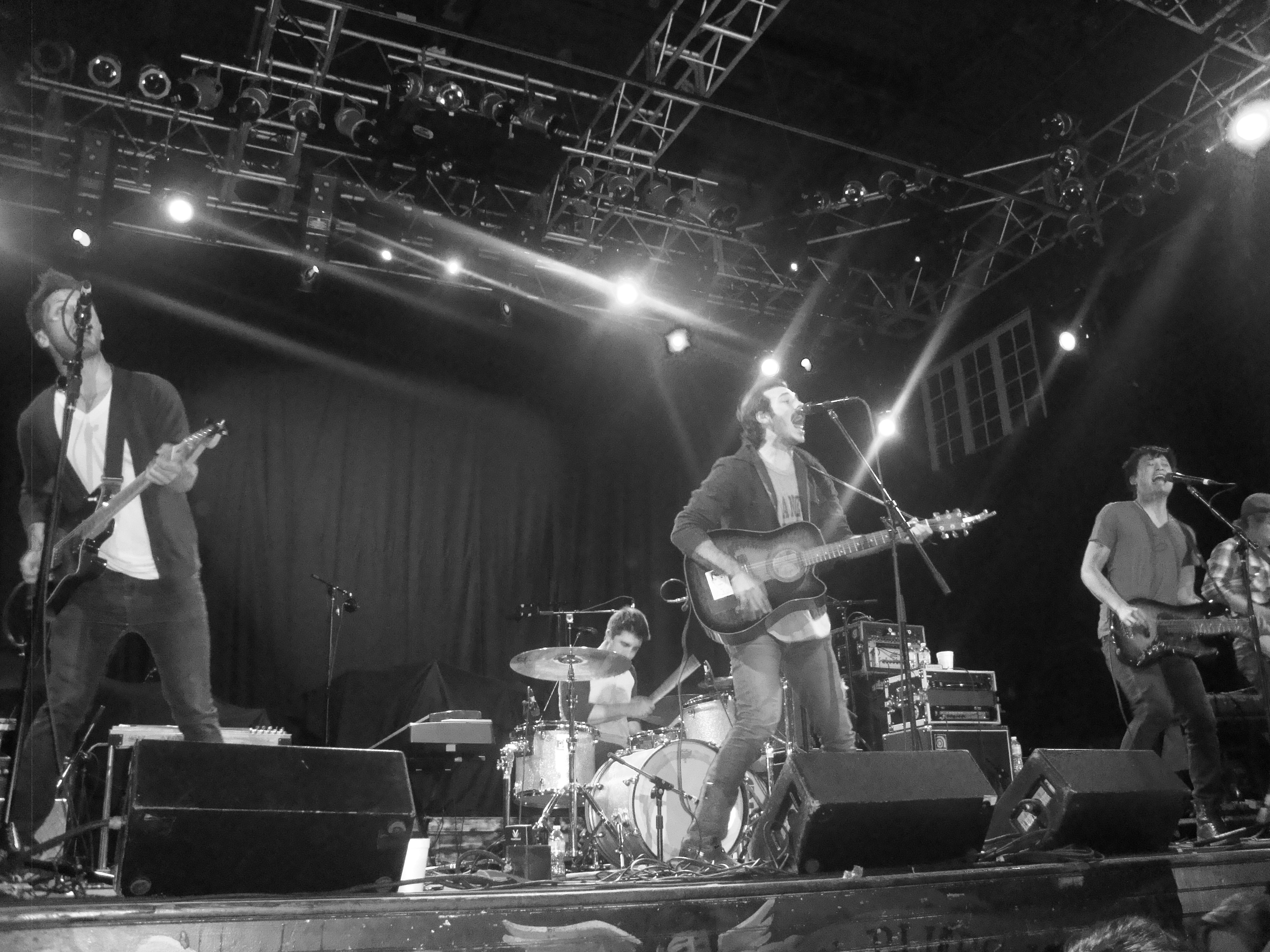

Background information
- Born: December 17, 1986 (age 38); Houston, Texas, U.S.
- Origin: Mesa, Arizona, United States
- Genres: Alternative Rock, Indie Rock, Acoustic
- Years active: 2007–present
- Website: http://www.myspace.com/austincgibbs

Austin Gibbs (born December 17, 1986) is an American musician.

Gibbs was born in Houston, Texas, on December 17, 1986, and spent much of his childhood in Southern California.

After a move to Mesa, Arizona, in 2001, he formed Austin Gibbs and the States. The group released a self-recorded demo in 2007. In the spring of 2008, Austin Gibbs and the States won a battle of the bands to perform on the main stage at the Circle K Tempe Music Festival. The group went on to perform at Bamboozle Left.

In January 2009, he recorded a self-titled EP with Bob Hoag at Flying Blanket Studios in Mesa. The EP was released in April 2009. A second EP, 1986, was released in September 2010. In May 2011, he released a full-length album, Charlie.

== Discography ==
- Austin Gibbs and the States (demo, 2007)
- Austin Gibbs (EP, 2009) and through 101 Distribution on May 5, 2009.
- 1986 (EP, 2010)
- Charlie (LP, 2011)
- Fall 2011 (Live) (EP, 2012)
