= This Century =

American pop rock band

- Origin: Phoenix, Arizona, United States
- Genres: Pop rock, indie pop, power pop
- Years active: 2006–2015
- Labels: Action Theory (2010-2012); Rude Records (2013-2014); 8123 (2015)
- Past members: Joel Kanitz; Ryan Gose; Alex Silverman; Sean Silverman

This Century was an American pop rock band from Phoenix, Arizona, United States. The band consisted of members Joel Kanitz, Ryan Gose, Alex Silverman, and Sean Silverman. In February 2014, Alex Silverman announced his departure from the group. In May 2015, the band announced that following the release of their third album Soul Sucker, they would be playing farewell shows and retiring the band so members could "pursue each of our passions and musical projects". The band has released three full-length albums: Soul Sucker, Biography of Heartbreak, and Sound of Fire.

== History ==
=== Beginnings (2006–2007) ===
The band was formed while most of the members were attending high school. They experimented with several names such as "Modern Poets", and kept this name for two shows before changing it to "Evident Earth". They finally decided on "This Century" after guitarist Silverman jokingly said they're "lucky if we come up with a band name some time this century".

=== Early EPs (2007–2009) ===
In 2007 This Century released their first EP titled 2007. They continued releasing EPs and singles throughout the years, including Look What We Made (2008), "Dream of Christmas" (2008), "Kiss Me Like It's Christmas" (2009), No Way Out Digital Sampler (2009), and To Love and Back (2009). In 2008, they were signed under Tim Kirch and Tanner Radcliffe at 8123 Management, and later performed acoustic sets at the Baby Cakes Tent during the 2009 Vans Warped Tour.

=== Tours and Sound of Fire (2010–2012) ===
In 2010 This Century was signed to The Maine's Action Theory Records. They then released the EP Hopeful Romantic Sampler (2010), consisting of three sampler tracks, the first of which was due to be on their debut album Sound of Fire. They performed at Bamboozle Left with bands such as Anarbor, The Ready Set, Never Shout Never, and The Summer Set. They also embarked on a nationwide tour with label mates The Maine and special guest Austin Gibbs on an "Evening With The Maine Tour".

While on the 'Hey Monday Tour' in late 2010 the band was forced to cancel their last few shows due to lead singer Joel Kanitz having vocal issues.

They have also toured with Good Charlotte and Forever the Sickest Kids on the 'Cardiology Tour'.

In March 2011 they released the title track off their debut album Sound of Fire as a single. The entire album was released on April 19, 2011.

In the summer of 2011 This Century embarked on their first headlining tour, the "Young and Useless Tour", with Carter Hulsey and Austin Gibbs. For personal reasons, Austin Gibbs left at the beginning of the tour and singer-songwriter Sweet Talker replaced Gibbs on select dates.

In June 2012 This Century played a show in Manila, Philippines together with We Are the in Crowd and Set Your Goals. "Everywhere Everything", a song from their debut album Sound of Fire made its way to the top of the charts in Manila for two weeks, while the song "Sound of Fire" also made its way to the top of the charts in June 2011.

This Century headlined The Endless Summer Tour with Austin Gibbs and made a new song with him called, "Someone For Everyone." This Century opened for The Maine's UK/Europe Pioneer tour in September 2012, and then returned to Manila December 9–10 of 2012 for two free concerts sponsored by Pulp magazine.

=== Biography of Heartbreak, Soul Sucker, and final tour (2013–2015) ===
This Century released their second album Biography of Heartbreak worldwide on May 14, 2013, via Rude Records in Europe, UK, Southeast Asia, Australia and Japan, and independently in the US in partnership with their management team Eighty One Twenty Three.

Produced by Colby Wedgeworth, their second full-length album included the hits "Bleach Blonde" and "Skeletons", as well as 11 new tracks. On April 23, 2013, This Century released a music video for the first single "Slow Dance Night" on Vevo. In support of the album, This Century joined The 8123 Tour with management label-mates The Maine as well as A Rocket to the Moon and Brighten.

In the fall/winter of 2013, This Century co-headlined the Up Close + Personal Tour with Nick Santino & The Northern Wind.

In February 2014 they announced the departure of bassist/keyboardist Alex Silverman.

In May 2015 the band announced that they would be playing a final tour after the release of their final album, Soul Sucker, so members could pursue separate musical careers.

Lead singer Joel Kanitz currently performs as a solo artist under the moniker Gorgeous War, drummer Ryan Gose releases music under the name Stop Dead and guitarist Sean Silverman now plays guitar in Arizona group The Technicolors.

== Discography ==
- 2011: Sound of Fire
- 2013: Biography of Heartbreak
- 2015: Soul Sucker

== Tours ==
Headlining

- The Endless Summer Tour w/ Austin Gibbs (Summer 2012)
- Acoustics Tour w/ The Getaways (Spring 2012)
- Young and Useless Tour (Summer 2011)
- Up Close and Personal Tour (Fall 2013)

Support Act

- The Long & Winding Roadshow (Fall 2014)
- Art of Tour (Spring 2014)
- The 8123 Tour (Summer 2013)
- Circuit Fest (Philippines, 2013)
- The Maine Europe Pioneer World Tour (Fall 2012)
- District Lines Tour (Spring 2011)
- Cardiology Tour (Spring 2011)
- Hey Monday Tour (Fall 2010)
- An Evening with the Maine Tour (Summer 2010)
- Bamboozle Left (Spring 2010)
- Vans Warped Tour (Summer 2009)
