= Nick Santino (musician) =

American musician, singer-songwriter (born 1988)

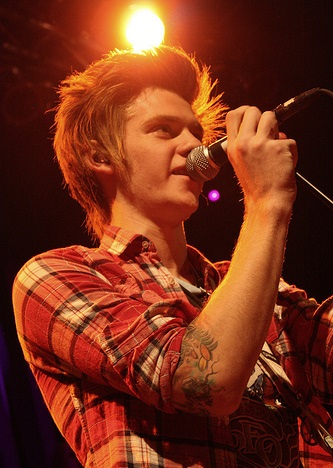
- Santino performing with A Rocket to the Moon in 2010

Background information
- Also known as: Nick Santino & the Northern Wind
- Born: Nicholas Bernard Santino; July 28, 1988 (age 38); Braintree, Massachusetts, US
- Genres: Alternative rock, pop rock, indie rock, pop punk, country
- Occupations: Musician, singer-songwriter
- Instruments: Vocals, piano, guitar
- Years active: 2006–present
- Labels: Fueled by Ramen, Decaydance, 8123, late nite/Arista Records
- Member of: Beach Weather
- Formerly of: A Rocket to the Moon
- Website: https://www.nicksantino.net/

Nicholas Bernard Santino (born July 28, 1988) is an American musician, singer-songwriter. He is best known as the lead singer and guitarist for the alternative rock band Beach Weather and former frontman of pop rock band A Rocket to the Moon. ARTTM albums included Your Best Idea (2006), On Your Side (2009) and Wild and Free (2013). After the band broke up in 2013, he went on to pursue a solo career and has released numerous solo EPs and a full-length album, Big Skies, which was released on May 27, 2014. In 2015, he formed the group Beach Weather.

== Early life ==
Nick Santino was born in Braintree, Massachusetts, on July 28, 1988, in the family of Bernie and Donna Santino. Santino grew up listening to The Beatles and James Taylor, who he cited as "heavy influences" to his music. He attended and graduated from Braintree High School. While in high school, Santino was in two bands called the Bad Year and the Midway Class as the lead singer. Around this time, he began listening to Johnny Cash, which influenced his songwriting style.

== Music career ==
=== A Rocket to the Moon (2006–2013) ===
Santino started A Rocket to the Moon in the summer of 2006 as a musical experiment. He self-released the debut studio album, Your Best Idea on December 26, 2006. In early 2008, he assembled a band of musicians with the help of the Maine. That same year, the band gained notoriety and was signed to Fueled By Ramen. A Rocket to the Moon released two EPs, before releasing their second studio album, On Your Side on October 13, 2009. The album features the single, "Like We Used To", which peaked at number 91 on the Billboard Hot 100. On March 26, 2013, the group released their third studio album, Wild & Free. On May 9, 2013, the band announced that they would be breaking up following their tour with the Maine. On January 21, 2017, the band played a one-off reunion show at 8123 Fest.

=== Solo career (2013–2015, 2019, 2020–present) ===
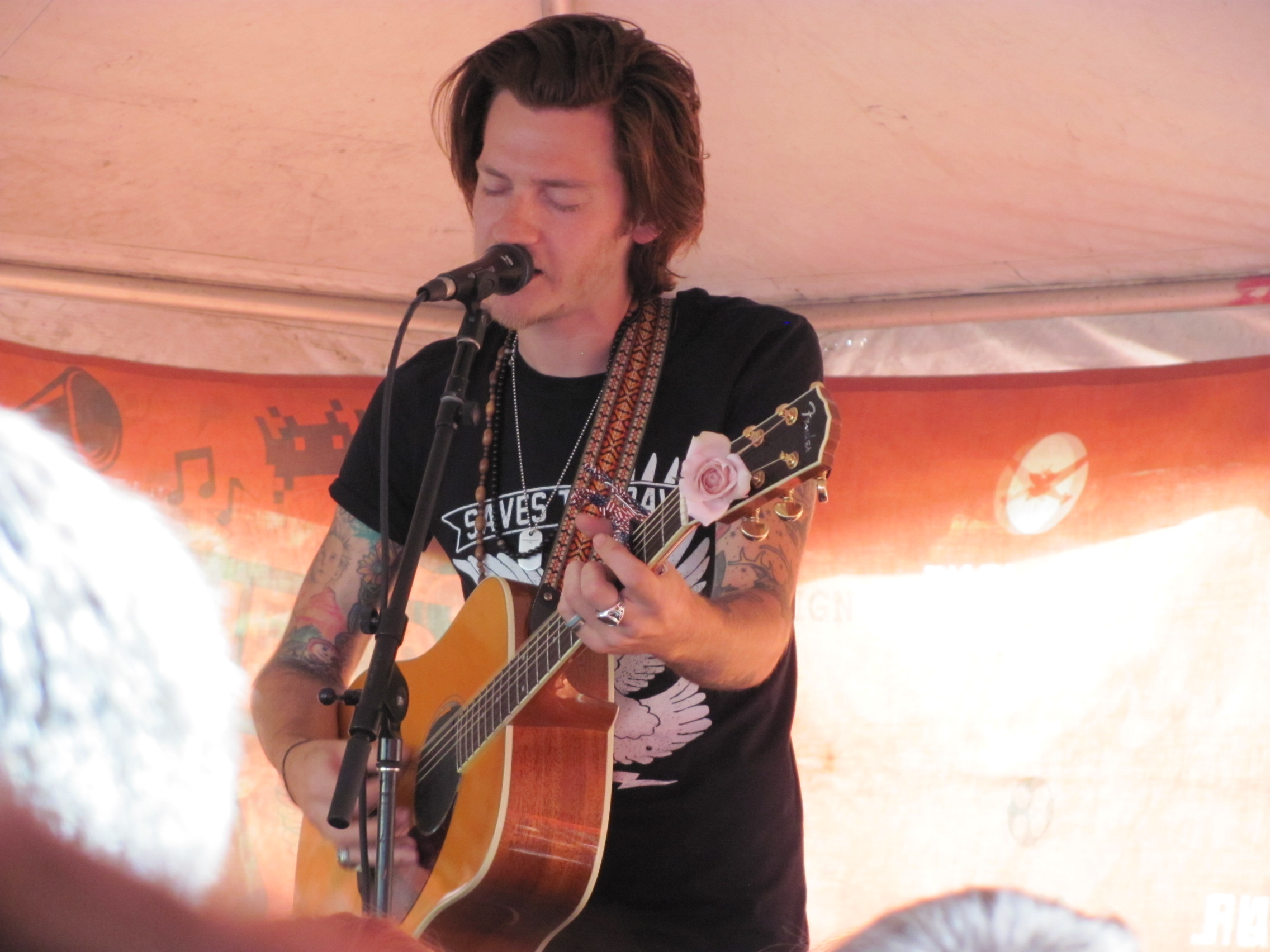
Santino performing in 2014

After the group broke up, Santino went on to pursue an alternative rock/country solo career under the name "Nick Santino and the Northern Wind". The name was something he wrote on his iPhone notes while he was on tour in 2010. On July 26, 2013, Santino premiered his debut single "Never Coming Back" under this name, ahead of the release his first 4-track EP Going Home, released through iTunes on July 30. He recorded the EP earlier in the year, where most of the tracks were written three to four years prior. The second EP, The Ones You Meet Along the Way: A Collection of Stories from the Road, was released on October 22, 2013. On November 2, 2013, Santino released the song "Wildfire on the Run" on YouTube. On December 20, 2013, Santino and Caitlin Harnett released their version of the Christmas song "Have Yourself a Merry Little Christmas". Santino participated in the Up Close & Personal tour with This Century in December 2013.

In 2014, Santino decided to go under his own name. He started writing songs for his forthcoming debut studio album in January and February 2014, and recorded the album in March and April. In May 2014, Santino joined the Maine on a South American tour. On May 23, a live EP of Nick Santino and the Maine titled, Live in Sao Paulo was released as a free download. That same day, he premiered the single, "Mood Ring Eyes" and on May 27, his debut solo full-length studio album, Big Skies was released. The album peaked at number 24 on the US Heatseekers Albums chart. Santino performed at the Vans Warped Tour in the summer of 2014. In October 2014, he joined the Maine on the UK leg of 8123 tour. On December 19, 2014, Santino released his fourth EP, Savannah. He embarked on a US tour in December 2014, in support of the EP.

In early 2015, he toured in Mexico with Hanson. In March 2015, he joined Oh Honey on the Postcards Across America tour. He also supported Sleeping with Sirens on the We Like It Quiet tour alongside The Summer Set in June 2015.

On August 10, 2019, Santino performed at Emo Carnival led by the Maine in São Paulo, Brazil. In November 2019, he played the Maine's The Mirror tour as a special guest. He also joined Mayday Parade at a concert show in New York.

On April 24, 2020, Santino released a single "Peace & Love", with the EP of the same name on May 29, 2020. He also released the singles, "But Anyway" and "Same Jokes (1989)", which were all a part of the EP.

=== Beach Weather (2015–2017, 2022–present) ===
In August 2015, Nick Santino formed Beach Weather with Reeve Powers (bass), Ian Holubiak (lead guitar) and Austin Scates (drums) after being invited by the Maine to open for their Free For All 2015 Tour. Their debut EP, What a Drag was written by Santino and Sean Silverman (of The Technicolors) and released on August 28, 2015, via 8123. They released two more EPs, Chit Chat (2016) and Basement Sessions (2017), before going on hiatus in July 2017. The group reunited in 2022, following the virality of their song "Sex, Drugs, Etc.". The song topped the Billboard Alternative Airplay chart. On March 3, 2023, they released their debut studio album, Pineapple Sunrise.

== Personal life ==
In 2017, Santino got married and has two children. Following Beach Weather's hiatus, Santino pursued a career in graphic design.

== Discography ==
=== Solo musician ===
==== Studio albums ====
List of studio albums, with selected chart positions
Title	Album details	Peak chart positions
Title	Album details	US Heat
Big Skies	Released: May 27, 2014; Label: 8123; Format: CD, digital download, streaming	24

==== Extended plays ====
List of extended plays with selected details
Title	Album details
Going Home	Released: July 30, 2013; Label: 8123; Format: Digital download, streaming
The Ones You Meet Along the Way: A Collection of Stories from the Road	Released: October 23, 2013; Label: 8123; Format: CD, digital download, streaming
Live in Sao Paulo	Released: May 23, 2014; Label: 8123; Format: Digital download, streaming
Savannah	Released: December 19, 2014; Label: 8123; Format: CD, digital download, streaming
Peace & Love	Released: May 29, 2020; Label: 8123; Format: Digital download, streaming

==== Singles ====
List of singles as lead artist with selected details
Title	Year	Album
"Never Coming Back"	2013	Going Home
"Have Yourself a Merry Little Christmas" (featuring Caitlin Harnett)	2013	Non-album single
"Mood Ring Eyes"	2014	Big Skies
"Long Way Home / While Listening to Rock N Roll" (featuring John O'Callaghan)	2014	Non-album single
"Peace & Love"	2020	Peace & Love
"But Anyway"	2020	Peace & Love
"Same Jokes (1989)"	2020	Peace & Love
"Seasonal Sadness"	2020	Non-album singles
"Anxiety"	2021	Non-album singles
"Uncle Carter"	2021	Non-album singles

=== A Rocket to the Moon ===
- Your Best Idea (2006)
- On Your Side (2009)
- Wild & Free (2013)

=== Beach Weather ===
- Pineapple Sunrise (2023)
- Melt (2024)

=== Guest appearances ===
- Silhouette Rising – "Take It or Leave It" from Happiness I (2013)
