= Screaming Bloody Murder =

Studio album by Sum 41
- Released: March 29, 2011
- Recorded: January 26 – June 24, 2010
- Studios: Perfect Sound (Hollywood); Capitol (Hollywood); EastWest (Hollywood); Mr Biz (Hollywood)
- Genres: Heavy metal; punk rock; hard rock; garage rock; emo
- Length: 48:36
- Label: Island
- Producer: Deryck Whibley

Sum 41 chronology
Underclass Hero (2007)	Screaming Bloody Murder (2011)	13 Voices (2016)

Singles from Screaming Bloody Murder
- 1. "Screaming Bloody Murder" Released: February 7, 2011; 2. "Baby You Don't Wanna Know" Released: August 3, 2011

Screaming Bloody Murder is the fifth studio album by Canadian rock band Sum 41, released on March 29, 2011, after many delays. It is the band's second album produced by frontman Deryck Whibley. It is the band's last album to be released on Island Records before they had fulfilled their contract with the major label in 2016 and their first album not to be released on Aquarius Records, which they left in 2010. The album has received mixed reviews.

It is the last album to be released with longtime original drummer, Steve Jocz before he announced his departure from the band in April 2013. Even though new guitarist Tom Thacker was already a part of the band and co-wrote the title track of the album, all guitars were still recorded by singer Deryck Whibley. Despite not playing on the album and being uncredited, Thacker is seen in photos with the band in the album's booklet.

== Background ==
The band initially entered the studio in late 2008 with plans to record an EP for release in April 2009, though as more and more material was written, they have decided to keep writing and make the recording a full-length album, with frontman Deryck Whibley commenting that "it's safe to say the album will be released in 2009", though it was fast announced by bassist Jason "Cone" McCaslin, and drummer Steve Jocz not to expect the album any sooner than Summer 2010.

In November 2009, it was announced that the band hired legendary British producer Gil Norton to produce the album, and that they would begin pre-production in December, and would begin recording the album in January 2010. The recording did begin in January 2010, but Gil Norton was dismissed one week into the recording, with Deryck Whibley deciding to produce the album himself, just as he did on the band's last effort Underclass Hero (2007).

Recording of instruments began on January 26, 2010, and finished on March 17, 2010, after which only vocals were left to record by Whibley himself in his home studio. Drums were recorded at Capitol Studios and Perfect Sound Studios, after which the band rented a house at the Hollywood Hills which served as their recording studio. Vocals were recorded until late March, when the band relocated to EastWest Studios, on April 7, 2010, to record additional songs for the album. On June 12, 2010, Deryck reported in a video update that the album was "99% done". Recording was finalized on June 24, 2010, a day before the band went on to play on the 2010 Vans Warped Tour. While playing on the Warped Tour, the album went into the mixing stage by Tom Lord-Alge in Miami, Florida.

It was announced that a new song entitled "Skumfuk" was set to appear on the Warped Tour sampler CD, though it eventually wasn't ready for release in time. On July 6, 2010, the track was leaked online, in a non-final form. The song began rising in popularity online, which led Sum 41 to start playing it live on their European tour in October. It was later announced that the band would release a 12-minute section from the album (later entitled "A Dark Road Out of Hell", consisting of tracks 7 – 9 of the final album) for free on their website before the official release. However, this release was later denied by the band's label. It was later revealed on the back of the album that "A Dark Road Out of Hell" was indeed true, comprising tracks 7–9 entitled "Holy Image of Lies", "Sick of Everyone", and "Happiness Machine".

In December 2010, bassist Jason "Cone" McCaslin confirmed that the album would finally go into mastering, and that though the album had essentially been ready for months, Island Records decided to postpone its release until after Christmas.

== Promotion ==
On July 6, 2010, Screaming Bloody Murder was announced for release the following month; alongside this, "Skumfuk" was posted online. On January 8, 2011, it was announced that the band would release the radio single "Screaming Bloody Murder" on February 7, 2011, in the United States. The song had its worldwide premiere on January 14, 2011, on the Windsor radio station 89X. Universal Japan has confirmed on the official Japanese Sum 41 website, that Screaming Bloody Murder will be released in Japan on March 23, 2011, after which it was confirmed on the band's official website that the album be released on March 29, 2011, in the US. On February 28, 2011, a stream of "Blood in My Eyes", another new song from the album, was released for free listening on Alternative Press. Universal Music Japan then announced that they postponed release date of the album in Japan because of the 2011 Tōhoku earthquake and tsunami, until April 6, 2011. On March 24, 2011, Island Records started streaming the record in its entirety on the band's official website.

"Baby You Don't Wanna Know" was the album's second single in the UK and Europe only. On June 22, 2011, during the band's performance in Angers, France, the band debuted the song live for the first time. Sum 41 shot a music video for "Baby You Don't Wanna Know" in June. In July 2011, Matt Whibley confirmed that the music video for the first single "Screaming Bloody Murder" would be left unreleased due to its content and difficulties with the label. On August 3, 2011, the band premiered the music video for "Baby You Don't Wanna Know" exclusively on German website Myvideo.de.

On February 29, 2012, the band shot a music video for "Blood in My Eyes", with director Michael Maxxis in Los Angeles, California. The video was shot in the desert around the Los Angeles area.

== Singles ==
"Screaming Bloody Murder", the band's first single in three years, was released on February 8, 2011, in the United States. It was released a day earlier, on February 7, in Europe. The song was released as a digital download only on iTunes, Amazon.com and other music retailers. The song had its worldwide premiere, a month before the official release, on January 13, 2011, on the Detroit area radio station 89X. It then premiered on AOL Radio, a few hours later the same day.

The band performed the song live for the first time on February 4, 2011, in Paris, France, the first date of their first official European leg of the Screaming Bloody Murder Tour. It was performed at every show of the album's tour

The songs "Screaming Bloody Murder" and "Skumfuk" were performed on Jimmy Kimmel Live! on March 31, 2011. "Screaming Bloody Murder" was also performed on Lopez Tonight on April 14, 2011.

"Baby You Don't Wanna Know", along with "Time for You to Go", was one of the four songs that were written and recorded by the band at the last minute, on April 7, 2010, at EastWest Studios in Hollywood, California. The song, co-written by Matt Squire, was added to the album at the last minute and its recording was funded by Deryck Whibley himself, as the label refused to pay for any more songs for the album.

As said by Todd Morse on the album's making-of documentary, Don't Try This at Home, the song's style was more in the vein of classic rock and "straight-up-rock and roll", taking influence from the Rolling Stones and the Beatles, as opposed to all the other songs that were written during 2008–2009, that resulted in a more "dark" alternative rock style.

In an interview with the band during their European tour in July 2011, the band has commented that they considered releasing either "Blood in My Eyes" or "Back Where I Belong" as the second single, but opted to release "Baby You Don't Wanna Know" instead, as it was more radio friendly. It is also on the soundtrack of the 2011 film Green Lantern.

The band performed the song live for the first time on June 22, 2011, in Angers, France, during the band's summer European leg of the Screaming Bloody Murder Tour. The song was since then performed at various other concerts, and although being an official single, the band does not perform it on every date. It was performed on and off until August 2011, and was not played again when the band resumed the tour in 2012.

== Critical reception ==
Professional ratings
Aggregate scores
Source	Rating
Metacritic	47/100
Review scores
Source	Rating
AbsolutePunk	76%
AllMusic	2.5/5 stars
Alternative Press	2.5/5 stars
Entertainment Weekly	C+
IGN	8/10
Kerrang!	2/5 stars
Now	2/5 stars
Rock Sound	7/10
Rolling Stone	2/5 stars
Sputnikmusic	1.5/5

The album has received generally mixed reviews since its release, with its darker tone and songwriting drawing varied reactions. In the site Metacritic, the album received a score of 47/100 based on 8 reviews.

Jonah Bayer of Alternative Press said: "While we believe Sum 41 has the potential to succeed without the power chords, the fact that only a handful of musical ideas are fully developed in the album is a frustrating experience to listen". Rock Sound remarked: "It is no longer a phenomenon but, Sum 41 have continued to mature as a pretty good band."

On the other hand, Sputnikmusic called the album "Revolting, messy, lazy, and undeniably Sum 41."

Grace Duffy of Under the Gun said:

Screaming Bloody Murder takes things up a notch, with a forceful and cutting rhythm and vocals to match. The undercurrent of rage and disillusionment is one that echoes throughout the record, and the band capture it well here.

=== Accolades ===
Sum 41 was nominated for the 2011 Grammy Award for Best Hard Rock/Metal Performance for the song "Blood in My Eyes", but they lost to Foo Fighters.

== Commercial performance ==
The album debuted at number 31 on the US Billboard 200, with first week sales of 15,000 copies. As of October 2016, the album has sold 52,000 copies.

== Track listing ==
All songs written and composed by Deryck Whibley, except where noted.

Standard edition
No.	Title	Writer(s)	Length
1.	"Reason to Believe"		3:28
2.	"Screaming Bloody Murder"	Whibley; Tom Thacker	3:24
3.	"Skumfuk"		3:24
4.	"Time for You to Go"		3:01
5.	"Jessica Kill"		2:50
6.	"What Am I to Say"		4:12
7.	"Holy Image of Lies" (A Dark Road Out of Hell: Part I)		3:47
8.	"Sick of Everyone" (A Dark Road Out of Hell: Part II)		3:05
9.	"Happiness Machine" (A Dark Road Out of Hell: Part III)		4:48
10.	"Crash"		3:19
11.	"Blood in My Eyes"		4:16
12.	"Baby You Don't Wanna Know"	Whibley; Matt Squire	3:34
13.	"Back Where I Belong"		3:41
14.	"Exit Song"		1:42
Total length:			48:36

iTunes bonus track
No.	Title	Length
15.	"Reason to Believe" (Acoustic)	2:38
Total length:		51:14

Japanese bonus track
No.	Title	Writer(s)	Length
16.	"We're the Same"	Whibley; Jason McCaslin	4:10
Total length:			55:24

== Personnel ==
Sum 41

- Deryck Whibley – vocals, guitars, production, mixing (tracks 4, 10, 12 & 14)
- Jason "Cone" McCaslin – bass
- Steve "Stevo32" Jocz – drums

Additional musicians

- James Levine – piano on "Crash"
- Dan Chase – percussion on "Holy Image of Lies", "Sick of Everyone" and "Happiness Machine"

Production

- Tom Lord-Alge – mixing
- Chris Lord-Alge – mixing (tracks 6 & 13)
- Femio Hernández – mixing assistant
- Nik Karpen – mixing assistant
- Ted Jensen – mastering
- Ryan Hewitt – engineering
- Jason Donaghy – engineering
- Travis Huff – additional engineering
- Joe Hirst – additional engineering
- Robbes Steiglitz – assistant engineering
- Ben O'Neil – assistant engineering
- Ken Sluiter – assistant engineering
- Brad Townsend – mixdown engineering
- Andrew Schubert – mixdown engineering

Artwork

- Kristen Yiengst – artwork, photo coordination
- James Minchin – photography
- Kristen Yiengst – artwork, photo coordination

== Charts ==
Chart (2011)	Peak position
Australian Albums (ARIA)	16
Austrian Albums (Ö3 Austria Top 40)	23
Belgian Albums (Ultratop Flanders)	64
Belgian Albums (Ultratop Wallonia)	75
Canadian Albums (Billboard)	9
Dutch Albums (Album Top 100)	100
French Albums (SNEP)	25
German Albums (Offizielle Top 100)	23
Italian Albums (FIMI)	72
Japanese Albums (Oricon)	7
Japanese Top Album Sales (Billboard)	6
Scottish Albums (OCC)	78
Spanish Albums (PROMUSICAE)	35
Swiss Albums (Schweizer Hitparade)	18
UK Albums (OCC)	66
UK Rock & Metal Albums (OCC)	5
US Billboard 200	31
US Top Rock Albums (Billboard)	5
US Top Alternative Albums (Billboard)	5
