= Screaming Bloody Murder Tour =

2010–13 concert tour by Sum 41

- Tour by Sum 41
- March 2, 2011 show at the Billboard, Melbourne, Australia
- Location: Asia; Europe; North America; Oceania; South America
- Associated album: Screaming Bloody Murder
- Start date: March 17, 2010
- End date: March 4, 2013
- Legs: 13
- No. of shows: 210

Sum 41 concert chronology
- European in Your Pants Tour (2010); Screaming Bloody Murder Tour (2010–13); 20th Anniversary Tour (2016)

The Screaming Bloody Murder Tour is a concert tour by the Canadian rock band Sum 41, taking place between 2010–11 and resuming again in 2012, in support of their fifth full-length studio album Screaming Bloody Murder.

The tour began in April 2010, and was set to take place until 2012, though following frontman Deryck Whibley sustaining a serious back injury, the tour was cut short in August 2011, and all following dates until the end of 2011 were cancelled, to let Whibley undergo a treatment and recover. The band rescheduled the tour for 2012, with the tour resuming in February 2012.

== Background ==
The tour began on April 17, 2010, dubbed as the European In Your Pants Tour, the band played a series of festivals and some headlining dates in April 2010, with plans to follow in May–June 2010 including appearances in Rock am Ring, Rock im Park and Nova Rock, which were all canceled upon drummer Steve Jocz' involvement in a car accident. After Stevo's recovery, the band started their North American leg on June 25, 2010, and toured as part of the Vans Warped Tour 2010 in the US and Canada, though they canceled few of the dates in the Warped Tour to take part at the Japanese Summer Sonic Festival on August 7 & 8, 2010. Upon Deryck being hospitalized for a slipped disc in his back after he was attacked at a bar in Japan, the band had to cancel the five remaining Warped Tour dates they had to play in August upon returning from Japan. The band continued their European tour on August 31, 2010, with a series of rescheduled dates of the summer European In Your Pants Tour until September 12. Following this, the band embarked on headlining European tour between October 27–December 1, 2010, headlining the annual Eastpak Antidote Tour, with support from The Black Pacific, Riverboat Gamblers and Veara, being the band's longest and most extended tour in Europe. During the tour, the band debuted a new song, "Skumfuk", the first song to be released from Screaming Bloody Murder, which was leaked to the internet earlier in July 2010.

On February 4, 2011, the band went on another European leg, dubbed as the first official European tour in support of Screaming Bloody Murder, which was announced for release on March 29, 2011. On this leg, the band played a total of 13 dates in mostly small venues, almost all of them sold out, and debuted the single "Screaming Bloody Murder" live for the first time. On February 16, 2010, the band began touring Australia as part of the Soundwave Festival dates through February–March 2011. After playing two dates in Brisbane and Sydney, it was announced on February 28, that Deryck was hospitalized with severe pneumonia and the band will be cancelling the rest of their Australian tour. In March 2011, the band celebrated the release of the Screaming Bloody Murder album in a short set of 8 shows in the US, including two homeland dates in Canada. The album's release show took place at the Glass House in Pomona, California.

In May 2011, the headlined a tour in Japan, dubbed as the 10th Anniversary Japanese Tour 2011. The tour's shows were the first where the band debuted new songs from the new album Screaming Bloody Murder except "Skumfuk" and the title track, which the band were already playing for a few months now. During the tour, the band was also the first international act to play in Sendai after the 2011 Tōhoku earthquake and tsunami. In the summer of 2011, the band embarked on a European summer leg, mostly playing European festivals such as Hurricane, Southside and Sonisphere Festival, also visiting for the first time such countries as Hungary, Slovakia, Croatia and Ukraine. In August 2011, the band was set to perform two shows in South Africa, the band's first shows in Africa ever, though the first show in Durban on August 5 was cancelled 2 hours after the band was set to take the stage, following severe strong winds rendered the stage area unsafe. The second South African show at the Oppikoppi Festival on August 7 took place as planned and was also streamed online via Ustream.

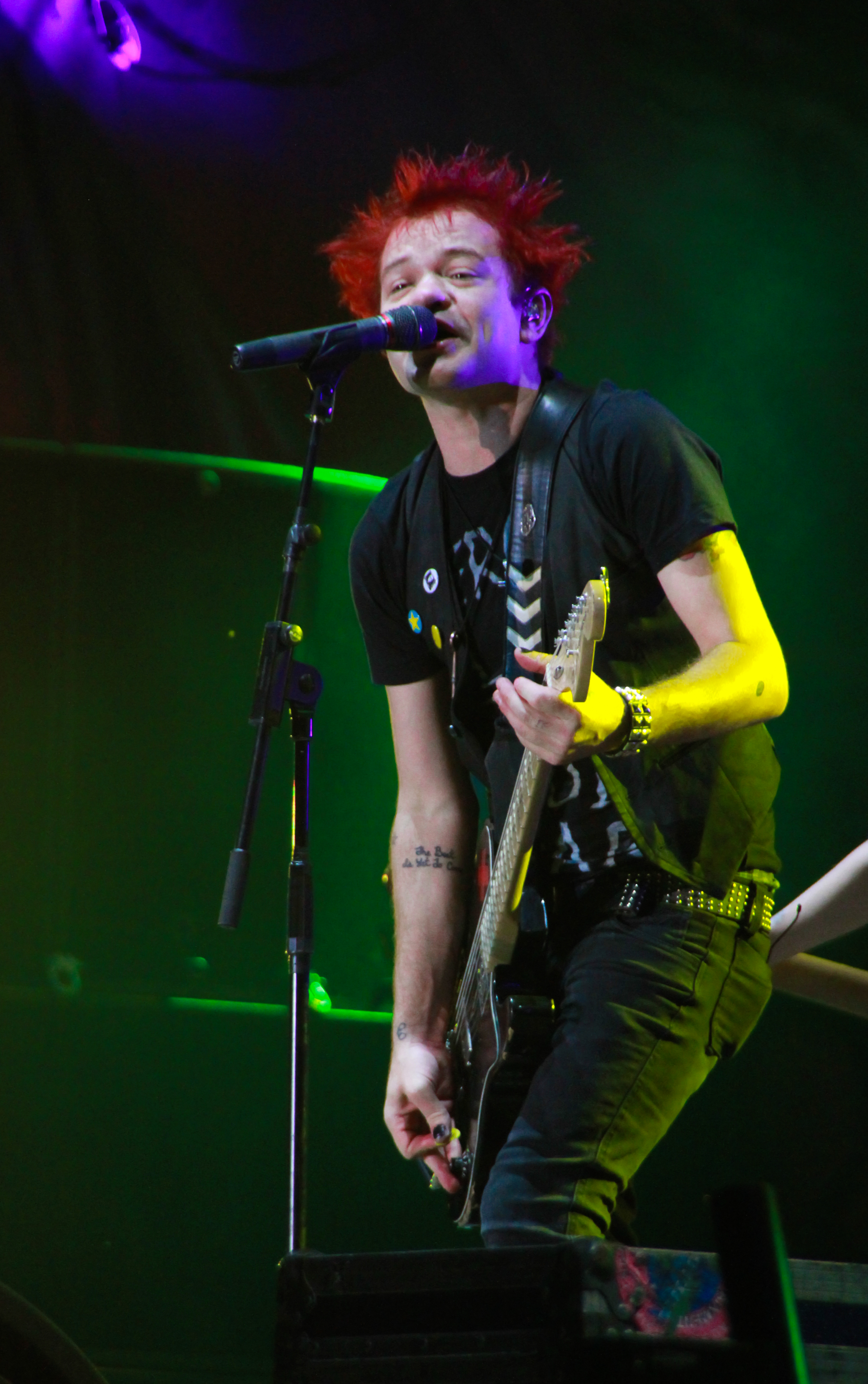
Deryck Whibley in Kubana 2012.

Following the South African dates, the band was set to return to North America playing a small bunch of Canadian shows as well as 5 Warped Tour dates, making up for the cancelled dates from last year's Warped Tour, though 3 dates into the tour, on August 13, 2011, it was announced that Deryck has re-injured his back and the band was forced to cancel once again the 2 remaining Warped Tour dates, as well as 4 Canadian dates. In early September 2011, the band was set to go on their first ever Latin American tour, where they were supposed to visit for the first time Mexico, Brazil, Chile and Argentina. In late September, the band was set to return to Australia, playing the new Soundwave Revolution Festival dates, making up for the cancelled Australian dates in February, though on August 9, 2011, it was announced that the Soundwave Revolution Festival would be cancelled following headliners Van Halen pulling out and the organizers failing to close a deal with a second headlining band to appear on the festival, later confirmed to be Aerosmith.

On August 23, 2011, it was announced on the band's official website that following Deryck Whibley's back injury on August 13, which forced the back to already cancel their US and Canadian dates in August, the band would be indefinitely postponing all upcoming tour dates for 2011, due to Deryck undergoing a treatment for his medical condition. It was confirmed that the band's first ever South American tour as well as their first ever Asian tour (excluding Japan), would all be cancelled, and rescheduled for some time in 2012.

On September 28, 2011, the first dates of the rescheduled 2012 Screaming Bloody Murder Tour were announced, these being a series of 11 dates in the UK and Ireland, co-headlining with New Found Glory, in February 2012. On November 1, 2011, it was announced that Sum 41 will co-headline the PunkSpring Festival in Japan, on March 31, 2012 in Tokyo and on April 1, 2012, in Osaka, with The Offspring, New Found Glory and All Time Low. It was then announced that the PunkSpring performances will be followed by a rescheduled Asian tour making up for the cancelled dates in October 2011, visiting such countries as China, Taiwan, Indonesia and Singapore. Dates in Malaysia and the Philippines though were not rescheduled.

On January 20, 2012, it was announced on the Kerrang website that Sum 41 was forced to pull off from the Kerrang UK tour in February, where they were supposed to co-headline with New Found Glory. It was said that frontman Deryck Whibley, who has suffered from a serious back injury back in August 2011, is still not well enough to play the tour, and so the band would be replaced by The Blackout.

After finishing the rescheduled Asian leg of the tour in April 2012, there was no more information released from the band about further touring. After being asked, bassist Cone McCaslin has said that due to Deryck's back treatment it is unlikely that the band will be touring in the coming months, and most likely start touring again around the fall, though on May 23, 2012, the band has announced that they will be touring in the summer after all, announcing a few European festival dates, with more to follow throughout the months of July and August. During the summer European tour of 2012, the band played a long-than-usual set, playing many songs that were never played live, such as "Billy Spleen" and "Count Your Last Blessings", and songs that haven't been played in years, such as "A.N.I.C.", "Hyper-Insomnia-Para-Condrioid", "No Reason" and "Rhythms", with the setlist varying almost every night.

On September 10, 2012, the band announced their first full headlining North American tour in 4 years, being the Does This Look Infected? 10th Anniversary Tour, in which the band is set to play the whole Does This Look Infected? album, as well as their greatest hits and songs from Screaming Bloody Murder.

This was the group's final concert tour with drummer Steve Jocz, who left the band in 2013.

== Set list ==
Europe, Leg #1
- "The Hell Song"
- "We're All to Blame"
- "In Too Deep"
- "Motivation"
- "Welcome to Hell"
- "My Direction"
- "King of Contradiction"
- "Metal Mayhem" (Old school heavy metal medley)
- "Over My Head (Better Off Dead)"
- "Makes No Difference"
- "Paint It Black" (The Rolling Stones cover)
- "Still Waiting"
- "Fat Lip"
Warped Tour 2010
- "The Hell Song"
- "We're All to Blame"
- "In Too Deep"
- "Motivation"
- "Over My Head (Better Off Dead)" / "Paint It Black" (The Rolling Stones cover) (Varied between dates)
- "King of Contradiction"
- "Makes No Difference"
- "Still Waiting"
- "Fat Lip"
Summer Sonic Festival 2010
- "The Hell Song"
- "We're All to Blame"
- "Motivation"
- "Walking Disaster"
- "In Too Deep"
- "My Direction"
- "Over My Head (Better Off Dead)"
- "Pieces"
- "Welcome to Hell"
- "King of Contradiction"
- "Paint It Black" (The Rolling Stones cover)
- "Makes No Difference"
- "Master of Puppets" (Metallica cover)
- "Underclass Hero"

Encore

- "Still Waiting"
- "Fat Lip"
- "Pain for Pleasure"
Europe, Leg #2 (Eastpak Antidote Tour)
- "Intro"
- "No Reason" (Played on first few dates only)
- "The Hell Song"
- "We're All to Blame"
- "My Direction"
- "Walking Disaster"
- "Skumfuk"
- "Motivation"
- "Master of Puppets" (Metallica cover)
- "King of Contradiction"
- "Underclass Hero"
- "Welcome to Hell"
- "Paint It Black" (The Rolling Stones cover) (Not played on every date)
- "Still Waiting"
- "Over My Head (Better Off Dead)"
- "Fat Lip"

Encore

- "Pieces" (Not played on every date)
- "In Too Deep"
- "Pain for Pleasure"
Europe, Leg #3
- "Intro"
- "My Direction"
- "We're All to Blame"
- "Skumfuk"
- "Over My Head (Better Off Dead)"
- "Walking Disaster"
- "Screaming Bloody Murder"
- "Motivation"
- "The Hell Song"
- "American Girl" (Tom Petty cover) / "Rebel Yell" (Billy Idol cover) (Varied between shows)
- "Master of Puppets" + "Enter Sandman" (Metallica cover)
- "Mr. Amsterdam"
- "Underclass Hero"
- "Makes No Difference"
- "Still Waiting"
- "In Too Deep"

Encore

- "Pieces"
- "Fat Lip"
- "Pain for Pleasure"
North America, Leg #2
- "Intro"
- "No Reason"
- "Skumfuk"
- "We're All to Blame"
- "Walking Disaster"
- "Over My Head (Better Off Dead)"
- "Screaming Bloody Murder"
- "Motivation"
- "The Hell Song"
- "My Direction"
- "Metal Mayhem" (Old school heavy metal medley)
- "Mr. Amsterdam"
- "Underclass Hero"
- "Rebel Yell" (Billy Idol cover)
- "In Too Deep"
- "Still Waiting"

Encore

- "Pieces"
- "Fat Lip"
- "Pain for Pleasure"
Europe, Leg #4
- "Reason to Believe"
- "Skumfuk"
- "We're All to Blame"
- "Walking Disaster"
- "Over My Head (Better Off Dead)"
- "Sick of Everyone"
- "Screaming Bloody Murder"
- "Motivation"
- "The Hell Song"
- "My Direction"
- "Metal Mayhem" (Old school heavy metal medley)
- "Fat Lip"
- "Underclass Hero"
- "Back Where I Belong" (Not played on every date)
- "Still Waiting"

Encore

- "Baby, You Don't Wanna Know"
- "In Too Deep"
- "Pain for Pleasure"
Africa
- "Reason to Believe"
- "The Hell Song"
- "Skumfuk"
- "We're All to Blame"
- "Walking Disaster"
- "Over My Head (Better Off Dead)"
- "Sick of Everyone"
- "Screaming Bloody Murder"
- "Motivation"
- "Metal Mayhem" (Old school heavy metal medley)
- "Fat Lip"
- "In Too Deep"
- "Back Where I Belong"

Encore

- "Still Waiting"
- "Pain for Pleasure"
Asia, Leg #2
- "Reason to Believe"
- "The Hell Song"
- "Walking Disaster"
- "We're All to Blame"
- "Over My Head (Better Off Dead)"
- "Skumfuk"
- "Motivation"
- "Sick of Everyone"
- "Screaming Bloody Murder"
- "In Too Deep"
- "Metal Mayhem" (Old school heavy metal medley)
- "Welcome to Hell"
- "Blood In My Eyes"
- "Underclass Hero"
- "Still Waiting"
- "Paint It Black" (The Rolling Stones cover)
- "Back Where I Belong"

Encore

- "We Will Rock You" (Queen cover)
- "Fat Lip"
- "Pain for Pleasure"
Europe, Leg #5
- "Reason to Believe"
- "Mr. Amsterdam"
- "Motivation"
- "In Too Deep"
- "We're All to Blame"
- "Walking Disaster"
- "Rhythms"
- "Screaming Bloody Murder"
- "Skumfuk"
- "No Reason" (Not played on every date)
- "Over My Head (Better Off Dead)"
- "No Brains"
- "A.N.I.C."
- "Sick of Everyone"
- "Count Your Last Blessings"
- "The Hell Song"
- "Still Waiting"
- "Fat Lip"

Encore

- "Pieces"
- "We Will Rock You" (Queen cover)
- "Back Where I Belong"
- "Exit Song"

== Tour dates ==
Date	City	Country	Venue
Warm-up dates
March 17, 2010	Austin	United States	SXSW
March 20, 2010	Austin	United States	The Alternative Press Attack
Europe, Leg #1
April 17, 2010	Milan	Italy	Give it a Name
April 18, 2010	Zürich	Switzerland	Give it a Name
April 20, 2010	Vienna	Austria	Give it a Name
April 21, 2010	Munich	Germany	Backstage Werk
April 23, 2010	Esch-sur-Alzette	Luxembourg	Rockhal
April 24, 2010	Meerhout	Belgium	Groezrock
April 25, 2010	Duisburg	Germany	T-Mobile Extreme Playground
~~May 27, 2010~~	~~Lisbon~~	~~Portugal~~	~~Rock in Rio Lisboa~~
~~May 29, 2010~~	~~Warsaw~~	~~Poland~~	~~Student Festival~~
~~June 1, 2010~~	~~Prague~~	~~Czech Republic~~	~~Roxy~~
~~June 2, 2010~~	~~Prague~~	~~Czech Republic~~	~~Roxy~~
~~June 3, 2010~~	~~Nürburg~~	~~Germany~~	~~Rock am Ring~~
~~June 4, 2010~~	~~Nuremberg~~	~~Germany~~	~~Rock im Park~~
~~June 5, 2010~~	~~Amsterdam~~	~~Netherlands~~	~~Powerfest~~
~~June 7, 2010~~	~~Paris~~	~~France~~	~~La Maroquinerie~~
~~June 10, 2010~~	~~Crans-près-Céligny~~	~~Switzerland~~	~~Caribana Festival~~
~~June 13, 2010~~	~~Nickelsdorf~~	~~Austria~~	~~Nova Rock Festival~~
North America, Leg #1As part of the Vans Warped Tour 2010
June 25, 2010	Carson	United States	The Home Depot Center
June 26, 2010	Mountain View	United States	Shoreline Amphitheatre
June 27, 2010	Ventura	United States	Seaside Park
June 29, 2010	Phoenix	United States	Cricket Wireless Pavilion
June 30, 2010	Lac Cruces	United States	NMSU Practice Field
July 1, 2010	San Antonio	United States	AT&T Center
July 2, 2010	Houston	United States	The Showgrounds at Sam Houston Race Park
July 3, 2010	Dallas	United States	SuperPages.com Center
July 5, 2010	Maryland Heights	United States	Verizon Wireless Amphitheater
July 6, 2010	Noblesville	United States	Verizon Wireless Music Center
July 7, 2010	Burgettstown	United States	First Niagara Pavilion
July 8, 2010	Cleveland	United States	Time Warner Cable Amphitheater
July 9, 2010	Mississauga	Canada	Arrow Hall
July 10, 2010	Montreal	Canada	Parc Jean-Drapeau
July 11, 2010	Hartford	United States	Meadows Music Theater
July 13, 2010	Mansfield	United States	Comcast Center for the Performing Arts
July 14, 2010	Corfu	United States	Darien Lake Performing Arts Center
July 15, 2010	Scranton	United States	Toyota Pavilion at Montage Mountain
July 16, 2010	Camden	United States	Susquehanna Bank Center
July 17, 2010	Uniondale	United States	Nassau Veterans Memorial Coliseum
July 18, 2010	Oceanport	United States	Monmouth Park Racetrack
July 20, 2010	Columbia	United States	Merriweather Post Pavilion
July 21, 2010	Virginia Beach	United States	Virginia Beach Amphitheater
July 22, 2010	Charlotte	United States	Verizon Wireless Amphitheatre
July 23, 2010	St. Petersburg	United States	Vinoy Park
July 24, 2010	West Palm Beach	United States	Cruzan Amphitheatre
July 25, 2010	Orlando	United States	Central Florida Fairgrounds
July 26, 2010	Atlanta	United States	Lakewood Amphitheatre
July 28, 2010	Cincinnati	United States	Riverbend Music Center
July 29, 2010	Milwaukee	United States	Marcus Amphitheater
July 30, 2010	Detroit	United States	Comerica Park
~~July 31, 2010~~	~~Tinley Park~~	United States	~~First Midwest Bank Amphitheatre~~
~~August 1, 2010~~	~~Shakopee~~	United States	~~Canterbury Park~~
~~August 2, 2010~~	~~Bonner Springs~~	United States	~~Sandstone Amphitheater~~
August 3, 2010	Lévis	Canada	Festivent
~~August 5, 2010~~	~~Edmonton~~	Canada	~~Northlands Park~~
Japan (Heian period) (Special festival dates)
August 7, 2010	Osaka	Japan	Summer Sonic Festival
August 8, 2010	Tokyo	Japan	Summer Sonic Festival
North America, Leg #1 (Continued)
~~August 11, 2010~~	~~Pomona~~	~~United States~~	~~Pomona Fairplex~~
~~August 12, 2010~~	~~Wheatland~~	~~United States~~	~~Sleep Train Amphitheatre~~
~~August 13, 2010~~	~~Nampa~~	~~United States~~	~~Idaho Center Amphitheater~~
~~August 14, 2010~~	~~George~~	~~United States~~	~~The Gorge Amphitheatre~~
~~August 15, 2010~~	~~Portland~~	~~United States~~	~~Washington County Fairgrounds~~
Europe, Leg #2
August 31, 2010	Lausanne	Switzerland	Les Docks
September 2, 2010	Paris	France	La Maroquinerie
September 3, 2010	Stekene	Belgium	Crammerock
September 4, 2010	Bologna	Italy	I-Day Festival
September 6, 2010	Nuremberg	Germany	Der Hirsch
September 7, 2010	Prague	Czech Republic	Lucerna Music Bar
September 8, 2010	Prague	Czech Republic	Lucerna Music Bar
September 10, 2010	Saint Petersburg	Russia	GlavClub
September 11, 2010	Moscow	Russia	Moscow Arena
September 12, 2010	Yekaterinburg	Russia	Tele-Club
October 27, 2010	Norwich	England	Norwich U.E.A.
October 28, 2010	Southampton	England	Southampton Guildhall
October 29, 2010	London	England	HMV Forum
October 31, 2010	Glasgow	Scotland	O_{2} ABC Glasgow
November 1, 2010	Manchester	England	Manchester Academy
November 2, 2010	Birmingham	England	O_{2} Academy Birmingham
November 3, 2010	Bristol	England	O_{2} Academy Bristol
November 5, 2010	Tilburg	Netherlands	013
November 6, 2010	Esch-sur-Alzette	Luxembourg	Rockhal
November 7, 2010	Paris	France	Élysée Montmartre
November 8, 2010	Brussels	Belgium	Ancienne Belgique
November 10, 2010	Toulouse	France	Le Bikini
November 11, 2010	Barcelona	Spain	Palau Sant Jordi
November 12, 2010	Lyon	France	Transbordeur
November 13, 2010	Milan	Italy	Alcatraz
November 14, 2010	Vienna	Austria	Gasometer
November 16, 2010	Zurich	Switzerland	Volkhaus
November 17, 2010	Karlsruhe	Germany	Substage
November 19, 2010	Münster	Germany	Skaters Palace
November 20, 2010	Berlin	Germany	Huxley's
November 21, 2010	Copenhagen	Denmark	Amager Bio
November 23, 2010	Helsinki	Finland	Nosturi
November 25, 2010	Stockholm	Sweden	Fryshuset
November 26, 2010	Gothenburg	Sweden	Brewhouse
November 27, 2010	Hamburg	Germany	Markthalle
November 28, 2010	Düsseldorf	Germany	Stahlwerk
November 30, 2010	Leipzig	Germany	Haus Auensee
December 1, 2010	Neu Isenburg	Germany	Hugenottenhalle
December 2, 2010	Warsaw	Poland	Palladium Club
Europe, Leg #3
February 4, 2011	Paris	France	La Maroquinerie
February 5, 2011	Paris	France	Le Zénith
February 6, 2011	Osnabrück	Germany	Hyde Park
February 8, 2011	Cologne	Germany	Live Music Hall
February 9, 2011	Saarbrücken	Germany	The Garage
February 10, 2011	Turin	Italy	Teatro della Concordia
February 12, 2011	Munich	Germany	Air & Style
February 13, 2011	Bologna	Italy	Estragon
February 15, 2011	Bilbao	Spain	Sala Rock Star
February 16, 2011	Madrid	Spain	Palacio Vistalegre
February 17, 2011	Lisbon	Portugal	Coliseu dos Recreios
February 19, 2011	Porto	Portugal	Hard Club
February 22, 2011	London	England	Camden Underworld
Oceania, Leg #1
February 26, 2011	Brisbane	Australia	Soundwave Festival
February 27, 2011	Sydney	Australia	Soundwave Festival
~~March 1, 2011~~	Sydney	Australia	~~The Metro Theatre~~
~~March 2, 2011~~	~~Melbourne~~	Australia	~~Billboard The Venue~~
~~March 4, 2011~~	~~Melbourne~~	Australia	~~Soundwave Festival~~
~~March 5, 2011~~	~~Adelaide~~	Australia	~~Soundwave Festival~~
~~March 7, 2011~~	~~Perth~~	Australia	~~Soundwave Festival~~
Spain (Special date)
March 12, 2011	Valencia	Spain	MTV Winter at Ciutat de les Arts i les Ciències
North America, Leg #2
March 16, 2011	Toronto	Canada	The Opera House
March 17, 2011	Windsor	Canada	St. Clair College
March 18, 2011	Detroit	United States	The Fillmore
March 19, 2011	Chicago	United States	115 Bourbon Street
~~March 25, 2011~~	~~Ventura~~	United States	~~Majestic Ventura Theatre~~
March 26, 2011	Spring Valley	United States	Extreme Thing Festival (Desert Breeze Skate Park)
March 27, 2011	San Diego	United States	House of Blues
March 29, 2011	Pomona	United States	The Glass House
April 1, 2011	Los Angeles	United States	Boardner's
May 7, 2011	Tucson	United States	KFMA Day
Asia, Leg #1
May 17, 2011	Sapporo	Japan	Zepp
May 19, 2011	Sendai	Japan	Zepp
May 20, 2011	Yokohama	Japan	Yokohama Blitz
May 21, 2011	Nagoya	Japan	Zepp
May 23, 2011	Fukuoka	Japan	Zepp
May 24, 2011	Osaka	Japan	Namba Hatch
May 25, 2011	Osaka	Japan	Namba Hatch
May 27, 2011	Tokyo	Japan	Studio Coast
May 28, 2011	Tokyo	Japan	Zepp
North America (Special festival date)
June 4, 2011	Tinley Park	United States	Q101 Jamboree
Europe, Leg #4
June 16, 2011	Gothenburg	Sweden	West Coast Riot
June 17, 2011	Scheeßel	Germany	Hurricane Festival
June 19, 2011	Tuttlingen	Germany	Southside Festival
June 20, 2011	Clermont-Ferrand	France	Co-opérative de Mai
June 22, 2011	Angers	France	Le Chabada
June 23, 2011	Bordeaux	France	Le Rocher de Palmer
June 24, 2011	Madrid	Spain	DCode Festival
June 26, 2011	Bologna	Italy	Sonisphere Festival
June 27, 2011	Vienna	Austria	Arena
June 29, 2011	Zagreb	Croatia	Boogaloo
June 30, 2011	Sopron	Hungary	VOLT Festival
July 2, 2011	Nové Mesto nad Váhom	Slovakia	Topfest
July 3, 2011	Hradec Králové	Czech Republic	Rock for People
July 5, 2011	Kyiv	Ukraine	Stereo Plaza
July 6, 2011	Moscow	Russia	Moscow Arena
July 8, 2011	Liège	Belgium	Les Ardentes Festival
July 9, 2011	Knebworth	England	Sonisphere Festival
July 11, 2011	Lille	France	Le Splendid
July 12, 2011	Amiens	France	Le Cirque Jules Verne
July 13, 2011	Sannois	France	EMB (Espace Michel Berger)
July 15, 2011	Sélestat	France	Léz Arts Scéniques Festival
July 16, 2011	Karlsruhe	Germany	Happiness Festival
Canada (Special date)
July 19, 2011	Vancouver	Canada	The Vogue
Africa
~~August 5, 2011~~	~~Durban~~	South Africa	~~The Wavehouse~~
August 7, 2011	Limpopo	South Africa	Oppikoppi
North America, Leg #3
August 10, 2011	Carson	United States	The Home Depot Center
August 11, 2011	Wheatland	United States	Sleep Train Amphitheatre
August 12, 2011	Boise	United States	Idaho Center Amphitheatre
~~August 13, 2011~~	~~George~~	United States	~~The Gorge Amphitheatre~~
~~August 14, 2011~~	~~Portland~~	United States	~~Washington County Fairgrounds~~
~~August 16, 2011~~	~~Victoria~~	~~Canada~~	~~Club Zone~~
~~August 18, 2011~~	~~Edmonton~~	~~Canada~~	~~The Starlite Room~~
~~August 19, 2011~~	~~Lumsden~~	~~Canada~~	~~Lumsden Arena~~
~~August 20, 2011~~	~~Winnipeg~~	~~Canada~~	~~Rock on the Range Canada~~
~~September 4, 2011~~	~~Mexico City~~	~~Mexico~~	~~Vive Cuervo Salón~~
South America
~~September 6, 2011~~	~~Santiago~~	~~Chile~~	~~Teatro Caupolicán~~
~~September 8, 2011~~	~~Curitiba~~	~~Brazil~~	~~Curitiba Master Hall~~
September 9, 2011	~~Rio de Janeiro~~	~~Brazil~~	~~Fundição Progresso~~
~~September 10, 2011~~	~~São Paulo~~	~~Brazil~~	~~Espaço Anchieta~~
~~September 11, 2011~~	~~Buenos Aires~~	~~Argentina~~	~~Estadio Malvinas Argentinas~~
France (Special dates)
~~September 16, 2011~~	~~La Courneuve~~	~~France~~	~~Fête de l'Humanité~~
~~September 17, 2011~~	~~Saint-Nolff~~	~~France~~	~~Festival de Saint-Nolff~~
Oceania, Leg #2
~~September 24, 2011~~	~~Brisbane~~	~~Australia~~	~~Soundwave Revolution~~
~~September 25, 2011~~	~~Sydney~~	~~Australia~~	~~Soundwave Revolution~~
~~September 30, 2011~~	~~Melbourne~~	~~Australia~~	~~Soundwave Revolution~~
~~October 1, 2011~~	~~Adelaide~~	~~Australia~~	~~Soundwave Revolution~~
~~October 3, 2011~~	~~Perth~~	~~Australia~~	~~Soundwave Revolution~~
Asia, Leg #2
~~October 6, 2011~~	~~Jakarta~~	~~Indonesia~~	~~Karnaval Beach~~
~~October 8, 2011~~	~~Kuala Lumpur~~	~~Malaysia~~	~~National Sports Complex~~
~~October 10, 2011~~	~~Taipei~~	~~Taiwan~~	~~Taipei University Auditorium~~
~~October 12, 2011~~	~~Shanghai~~	~~China~~	~~Shanghai Indoor Stadium~~
~~October 14, 2011~~	~~Beijing~~	~~China~~	~~Beijing Wukesong Culture & Sports Center~~
~~October 16, 2011~~	~~Makati~~	~~Philippines~~	~~A-Venue Hall~~
~~October 18, 2011~~	~~Bali~~	~~Indonesia~~	~~Hard Rock Cafe~~
Europe, Leg #5
~~February 4, 2012~~	~~Dublin~~	~~Ireland~~	~~The Academy~~
~~February 5, 2012~~	~~Dublin~~	~~Ireland~~	~~The Academy~~
~~February 7, 2012~~	~~Southampton~~	~~England~~	~~Southampton Guildhall~~
~~February 8, 2012~~	~~Norwich~~	~~England~~	~~Norwich U.E.A.~~
~~February 10, 2012~~	~~Bristol~~	~~England~~	~~O_{2} Academy Bristol~~
~~February 11, 2012~~	~~Cardiff~~	~~Wales~~	~~Cardiff University Great Hall~~
~~February 12, 2012~~	~~Newcastle upon Tyne~~	~~England~~	~~O_{2} Academy Newcastle~~
~~February 13, 2012~~	~~Glasgow~~	~~Scotland~~	~~O_{2} ABC Glasgow~~
~~February 15, 2012~~	~~Manchester~~	~~England~~	~~Manchester Academy~~
~~February 16, 2012~~	~~Birmingham~~	~~England~~	~~O_{2} Academy Birmingham~~
~~February 17, 2012~~	~~London~~	~~England~~	~~The Roundhouse~~
Asia, Leg #2 (Rescheduled)
March 31, 2012	Tokyo	Japan	PunkSpring Festival
April 1, 2012		Japan	PunkSpring Festival
April 2, 2012	Nagoya	Japan	PunkSpring Festival
April 4, 2012	Shanghai	China	Shanghai Indoor Stadium
April 6, 2012	Beijing	China	Beijing Wukesong Culture & Sports Center
April 8, 2012	Taipei	Taiwan	Taipei University Auditorium
April 10, 2012	Jakarta	Indonesia	Mata Elang International Stadium
April 12, 2012	Central Area	Singapore	Front Gate
April 14, 2012	Kuala Lumpur	Malaysia	KL Live
Europe, Leg #5 (Rescheduled)
July 6, 2012	Coventry	England	Kasbah
July 7, 2012	Somerset	England	Relentless NASS Festival
July 8, 2012	Tilburg	Netherlands	013
July 10, 2012	Strasbourg	France	La Laiterie
July 12, 2012	Bordeaux	France	Rockschool Barbey
July 13, 2012	Villena	Spain	Aupa Lumbreiras
July 14, 2012	Bilbao	Spain	Bilbao BBK Live
July 16, 2012	Toulouse	France	Le Bikini
July 17, 2012	Nîmes	France	Festival de Nîmes
July 19, 2012	Dornbirn	Austria	Conrad Sohm
July 20, 2012	Zurich	Switzerland	Abart Music Club
July 21, 2012	Milan	Italy	Rock in IdRho
July 23, 2012	Cologne	Germany	Bürgerhaus Stollwerck
July 25, 2012	Moscow	Russia	Moscow Arena
July 27, 2012	Saint Petersburg	Russia	Cosmonaut Club
July 29, 2012	Nizhny Novgorod	Russia	Milo Concert Club
July 31, 2012	Yekaterinburg	Russia	Tele-Club
August 2, 2012	Krasnodar	Russia	Kubana Festival
August 4, 2012	Burgas	Bulgaria	Spirit of Burgas
August 6, 2012	Berlin	Germany	Fritzclub im Postbahnhof
August 7, 2012	Würzburg	Germany	Posthalle
August 9, 2012	Prague	Czech Republic	Lucerna Music Bar
August 10, 2012	Bildein	Austria	Picture On Festival
August 11, 2012	Budapest	Hungary	Sziget Festival
North America, Leg #4
October 31, 2012	Indianapolis	United States	Old National Centre
November 2, 2012	Chicago	United States	House of Blues
November 3, 2012	Cincinnati	United States	Bogart's
November 4, 2012	Royal Oak	United States	Royal Oak Music Theatre
November 5, 2012	Cleveland	United States	House of Blues
November 7, 2012	Buffalo	United States	The Town Ballroom
November 8, 2012	Toronto	Canada	Phoenix Concert Theatre
November 10, 2012	Montreal	Canada	Métropolis
November 11, 2012	Quebec City	Canada	Imperial Theater
November 14, 2012	New York City	United States	Irving Plaza
November 15, 2012	Philadelphia	United States	Theater of the Living Arts
November 16, 2012	Huntington	United States	Paramount Theatre
November 17, 2012	Lancaster	United States	The Chameleon Club
November 19, 2012	Providence	United States	Met Cafe
November 20, 2012	Boston	United States	Paradise Rock Club
November 21, 2012	New Britain	United States	Club International
November 23, 2012	Allentown	United States	Crocodile Rock
November 24, 2012	Sayreville	United States	Starland Ballroom
November 27, 2012	Silver Spring	United States	The Fillmore
November 28, 2012	Pittsburgh	United States	Alter Bar
November 30, 2012	Norfolk	United States	Norva Theatre
December 1, 2012	ASheville	United States	Orange Peel
December 2, 2012	Charlotte	United States	The Fillmore Charlotte
December 4, 2012	Birmingham	United States	WorkPlay Theater
December 5, 2012	Atlanta	United States	The Masquerade
December 7, 2012	Tampa	United States	The Ritz
December 8, 2012	Orlando	United States	House of Blues
December 9, 2012	Fort Lauderdale	United States	Culture Room
Oceania, Leg #2 (Rescheduled)
February 23, 2013	Brisbane	Australia	Soundwave Festival
February 24, 2013	Sydney	Australia	Soundwave Festival
March 1, 2013	Melbourne	Australia	Soundwave Festival
March 2, 2013	Adelaide	Australia	Soundwave Festival
March 4, 2013	Perth	Australia	Soundwave Festival

== Support acts ==
- A Place in the Sun (April 23, 2010)
- Atomic Shelters (July 20, 2012)
- Attack Attack! (September 4–11, 2011)
- Carrion (December 2, 2010)
- Dead Country (March 25–29, 2011)
- Destine (July 8, 2012)
- Everlyn (February 15, 2011)
- Fitacola (February 17–19, 2011)
- Follow You Home (July 8, 2012)
- Four Square (April 21–23, 2010)
- Four Year Strong (September 4–11, 2011)
- From Our Hands (September 7–8, 2010)
- Hill Valley (June 20–23, 2011; July 11–12, 2011)
- If I Die Today (February 13, 2011)
- Itchy Poopzkid (September 6, 2010)
- Kemble Walters and the Blank Faces (April 1, 2011)
- Kinoklub (June 29, 2011)
- letlive. (February 4–17, 2012)
- No Regrets (February 16, 2011)

- Noize MC (July 6, 2011)
- O.Torvald (July 5, 2011)
- Pierce the Veil (September 4–11, 2011)
- popKorn (September 11, 2010)
- Radio Havanna (February 6–9, 2011)
- Riverboat Gamblers (October 27–December 1, 2010)
- Spark Gap (July 13, 2011)
- Templeton Pek (February 22, 2011; August 9, 2012)
- The Blackout (March 1–2, 2011)
- The Black Pacific (October 27–December 1, 2010)
- The Darlings (March 25–29, 2011)
- The Starliners (February 5, 2011)
- There for Tomorrow (March 1–2, 2011)
- Tonight Alive (March 29, 2011)
- Turboweekend (December 2, 2010)
- Veara (October 27–December 1, 2010; March 1–2, 2011)
- While She Sleeps (February 4–17, 2012)
- Тёплые Дни (September 10, 2010; July 6, 2011)

== Co-headlining ==
- Billy Talent (July 19, 2011)
- New Found Glory (February 4–17, 2012)

== As a supporting act ==
- My Chemical Romance (June 27, 2011)

== Personnel ==
- Deryck Whibley – lead vocals, rhythm guitar
- Tom Thacker – lead guitar, backing vocals
- Cone McCaslin – bass, backing vocals
- Steve Jocz – drums, backing vocals

== Songs Played ==
=== From Half Hour of Power ===
- Makes No Difference

=== From All Killer No Filler ===
- Fat Lip
- Rhythms
- Motivation
- In Too Deep
- Pain for Pleasure

=== From Does This Look Infected? ===
- The Hell Song
- Over My Head (Better Off Dead)
- My Direction
- Still Waiting
- A.N.I.C.
- No Brains
- Mr. Amsterdam

=== From Chuck ===
- Intro
- No Reason
- We're All to Blame
- Welcome to Hell
- Pieces
- 88

=== From Underclass Hero ===
- Underclass Hero
- Walking Disaster
- Count Your Last Blessings
- King of Contradiction

=== From Screaming Bloody Murder ===
- Reason to Believe
- Screaming Bloody Murder
- Skumfuk
- Holy Image of Lies
- Sick of Everyone
- Happiness Machines
- Blood In My Eyes
- Baby, You Don't Wanna Know
- Back Where I Belong
- Exit Song

=== Other ===
- Paint It Black (The Rolling Stones cover)
- Rebel Yell (Billy Idol cover)
- American Girl (Tom Petty and the Heartbreakers cover)
- We Will Rock You (Queen cover)
- Master of Puppets (Metallica cover)
- Enter Sandman (Metallica cover)
