= Screaming Bloody Murder (song) =

Single by Sum 41

from the album Screaming Bloody Murder
- Released: February 7, 2011
- Recorded: January 26–June 24, 2010 at Capitol Studios, Perfect Sound Studios, Mr. Biz Studio, Hollywood, Los Angeles, California
- Genre: Melodic hardcore; alternative metal
- Length: 3:26
- Label: Island
- Songwriters: Deryck Whibley; Tom Thacker
- Producer: Deryck Whibley

Sum 41 singles chronology
"With Me" (2008)	"Screaming Bloody Murder" (2011)	"Baby You Don't Wanna Know" (2011)

"Screaming Bloody Murder" is the first single from Sum 41's fifth studio album of the same name, officially released on February 7, 2011, although originally slated for release in August 2010. This is Sum 41's first single to feature guitarist Tom Thacker. The song's working title was "Panic Attack" and it was written by Thacker for the album Muertos Vivos by his other band Gob, though it did not make the album, then reworked, rearranged and re-recorded by guitarist Deryck Whibley. Although written by Thacker, all guitars on the song, as well as on the rest of the album were recorded by Deryck Whibley by himself.

== Background ==
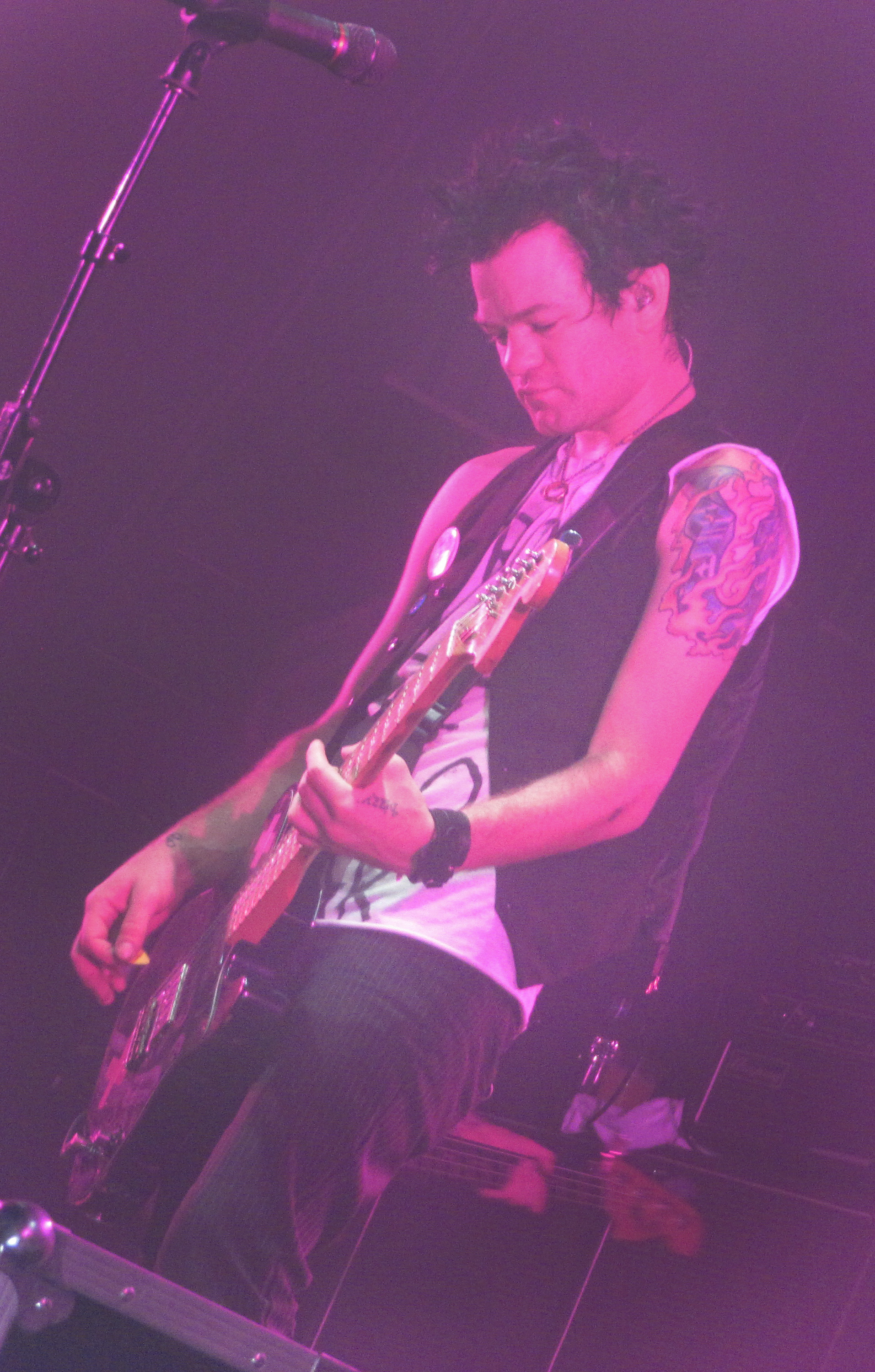
Deryck Whibley in Moscow on September 11, 2010.

On January 8, 2011, it was announced that the band will release the single "Screaming Bloody Murder" on February 8, 2011, in the United States, the band's first single in 3 years. It was released a day earlier, on February 7, in Europe. The song was released as a digital download only on iTunes, Amazon.com and other music retailers, with no intention to release it as a physical CD single. The song had its worldwide premiere, a month before the official release, on January 13, 2011, on the Detroit area radio station 89X. It then premiered on AOL Radio, a few hours later the same day. "Screaming Bloody Murder" was released to radio on February 8, 2011.

== Live performances ==
The band performed the song live for the first time on February 4, 2011, in Paris, France, the first date of their first official European leg of the Screaming Bloody Murder Tour. It has since been performed live on every show.

The song "Screaming Bloody Murder" was performed on Jimmy Kimmel Live! on March 31, 2011. "Screaming Bloody Murder" was also performed on Lopez Tonight on April 14, 2011.

== Music video ==
It was first announced that the music video will be recorded somewhere in Los Angeles over the last week of January, before the band is leaving for their European tour in February 2011. Though, since then it was confirmed by band assistant and Deryck Whibley's cousin, Matt, that the label hasn't approved the concept and idea the band had for the music video and so no video was made for the song. It was then said by the band that a different music video will be recorded when the band comes back from the Australian Soundwave Festival in March. On March 23, 2011, it was announced on the band's Facebook page that shooting for the music video will take place at the Roxy Theatre in Los Angeles on April 3, 2011, and that fans are invited to come and take part in the filming of the video. It was directed by Steve Jocz.

In June 2011, Cone McCaslin has confirmed that the music video might go unreleased, due to difficulties with the label. In July 2011, Matt Whibley confirmed that the music video will indeed be left unreleased, and a music video for the next single will be released instead.

During Loudwire's Wikipedia Fact or Fiction feature which was released on November 2, 2016, the band was asked about the "Screaming Bloody Murder" video, to which Cone answered that he has the video on his computer, though there are no plans to release it in the future, going as far as commenting "I don't think anyone will ever see that video" and "It's nothing that people should see right now."

== Reception ==
The song was received well, with most critics positively comparing it to the style used in the band's album Chuck.

== Track listing ==
Digital download
No.	Title	Length
1.	"Screaming Bloody Murder"	3:26

== Charts ==
Chart (2011)	Peak position
Canada (Canadian Hot 100)	72
Canada Rock (Billboard)	12
Japan Hot Overseas (Billboard)	19
UK Rock & Metal (OCC)	36
US Rock Digital Song Sales (Billboard)	38
US Alternative Airplay (Billboard)	37

== Release history ==
Release history and formats for "Screaming Bloody Murder"
Region	Date	Format
Australia	February 7, 2011	Digital download; airplay
European Union (excluding the UK)	February 7, 2011	Digital download; airplay
United Kingdom	February 8, 2011	Digital download; airplay
United States	February 8, 2011	Digital download; airplay
Japan	February 11, 2011	Digital download; airplay
Brazil	February 25, 2011	Digital download; airplay
