= List of Lopez Tonight episodes =

This is a list of episodes of Lopez Tonight, which aired from November 9, 2009, to August 12, 2011, on TBS.

== 2009 ==
=== November ===
No.	Original release date	Guest(s)	Musical/entertainment guest(s)
1	November 9, 2009	Ellen DeGeneres, Eva Longoria, Kobe Bryant	Carlos Santana ("Oye Como Va"), ("The World is Rated X")
Audience Game
2	November 10, 2009	Jamie Foxx, Marc Anthony	Marc Anthony ("Tu Amor Me Hace Bien")
Corporate Sponsor for the show, Grown-up Play Date
3	November 11, 2009	Queen Latifah, Michael Bearden	Michael Jackson's Band ("Man in the Mirror")
Creepy Little White Girl
4	November 12, 2009	Larry David, Lisa Lampanelli	Jay Sean ("Down"), Birdman ("Written On Her")
Larry David's DNA Test
5	November 16, 2009	Charlie Sheen, Demi Lovato	Slash
Slash and Tommy Organ Guitar Duel
6	November 17, 2009	Andy García, The Real Housewives of Orange County	Justin Bieber ("One Time")
Bullet Wound/Not a Bullet Wound
7	November 18, 2009	Oscar De La Hoya, Paul Mooney	Amerie ("Heard 'Em All")
Chola Girl Makeover
8	November 19, 2009	Ted Danson, Bill Engvall	Orianthi ("According To You")
Creepy Little White Girl, Dear George
9	November 23, 2009	Eva Mendes, Craig Robinson	Mary J. Blige ("I Am")
British Versions of American Posters
10	November 24, 2009	Sandra Bullock, Derek Luke	Shakira ("Give It Up To Me")
Sandra Bullock Chola Makeover
11	November 25, 2009	Arsenio Hall	Jo Koy
Black Barbie Ain't Nothing!
12	November 26, 2009	Taylor Lautner, Kristin Cavallari	LMFAO ("La La La")
"Twilight" - Make Me Like It!, The Hills: 2012
13	November 30, 2009	Katey Sagal, Joanna Krupa	David Guetta Ft. Akon ("Sexy Chick")
Tiger Woods is in Trouble, Lopez Tonight Dance Competition

=== December ===
No.	Original release date	Guest(s)	Musical/entertainment guest(s)
14	December 1, 2009	Jessica Alba, Columbus Short	The Bravery ("Slow Poison")
Creepy Little White Girl, Jessica Alba's DNA Test, Celebrity Endorsements
15	December 2, 2009	Taye Diggs, Kaley Cuoco	Ruben Paul (Comedian)
Bullet Wound/Not a Bullet Wound, Apologies and Retractions
16	December 3, 2009	Laurence Fishburne, Olivia Munn	Los Lobos ("Good Morning Aztlán")
Stump the Dancer
17	December 7, 2009	Kathy Griffin, Rico Rodriguez	Sean Paul ("Hold My Hand")
Welcome to Your 15 Minutes with Kato Kaelin, Bullet Wound/Not a Bullet Wound
18	December 8, 2009	Clint Eastwood, Jane Lynch	Dierks Bentley Ft. Patty Griffin ("Beautiful World"), Overtone (musical group)
Grand Torino Re-Edit, Make Me cool
19	December 9, 2009	Cedric the Entertainer	Morrissey ("Don't Make Fun Of Daddy's Voice")
Dear George
20	December 10, 2009	Hilary Duff, Scott Bakula	Rudy Moreno (Comedian)
Snoop Dogg & George Sell Brownies, "What the Hell is It?"
21	December 14, 2009	Mark Harmon, 50 Cent	50 Cent ("Baby by Me"), ("Do You Think About Me")
Regrettable Celebrity Phone Messages, The "Thuggie"
22	December 15, 2009	George Lopez show reunion Belita Moreno, Constance Marie, Valente Rodriguez, Masiela Lusha, Luis Armand Garcia, Aimee Garcia	War ("Low Rider")
Creepy Little Sitcom Mom, Everybody Dance!, George Lopez Finale
23	December 16, 2009	Mariah Carey, David Beckham	Mariah Carey ("Obsessed")
Style It Like Beckham!, George's DNA Test
24	December 17, 2009	Ray Romano, Lake Bell, Cast Of Jersey Shore	Mariah Carey ("It's A Wrap")
Ray's Driving Technique

== 2010 ==
=== January ===
No.	Original release date	Guest(s)	Musical/entertainment guest(s)
25	January 11, 2010	Jackie Chan, Kesha	Kesha ("Tik Tok")
The Goatee Awards, Creepy Little White Girl, Tiger Woods Magazine Covers
26	January 12, 2010	Jennifer Love Hewitt, Pitbull	Pitbull ("Shut It Down")
Goatee Political Ad, "Avatar" Chola Makeover
27	January 13, 2010	Charles Barkley, Carrie Ann Inaba	N/A
Charles Barkley DNA Results, Obama Billboards, Sh#%t My Dad Says...
28	January 14, 2010	Snoop Dogg, Saoirse Ronan	Snoop Dogg ("I Wanna Rock"), Cypress Hill ("Insane in the Brain")
Celebrity GPS, Snoop's DNA Results
29	January 18, 2010	Amber Valletta, Mark Valley, Jennifer Lopez, and Christian Lander	N/A
Jennifer Lopez Hijacks Lopez Tonight, Vajazzled Vajayjay Crisis, George Interviews Mark McGwire
30	January 19, 2010	Brendan Fraser, Khloé Kardashian, Kim Kardashian	N/A
Screaming Goat Spanglish Lesson, Whip It Out
31	January 20, 2010	Tyrese Gibson, Betty White	Hannibal Buress (Comedian)
Chihuahua Rescue
32	January 21, 2010	Samuel L. Jackson, Omarion	Omarion ("I Get It In")
Bullet Wound/Not a Bullet Wound
33	January 25, 2010	Cheech & Chong, Regina King	Train ("Hey, Soul Sister")
Creepy Little White Girl With Cheech & Chong
34	January 26, 2010	Sofía Vergara, James Van Der Beek	Jamie Kennedy (Comedian)
Ode to George's Goatee
35	January 27, 2010	Kristen Bell, Charlie Wilson	Charlie Wilson ("There Goes My Baby")
Story Time with George, All-American Basketball League
36	January 28, 2010	Ludacris, Elisha Cuthbert	David Guetta, Kelly Rowland ("When Love Takes Over")
Simpler Times With Ludacris

=== February ===
No.	Original release date	Guest(s)	Musical/entertainment guest(s)
37	February 1, 2010	Giovanni Ribisi, Jessica Capshaw	Iyaz ("Replay")
38	February 2, 2010	Jon Heder	Russell Peters (Comedian)
39	February 3, 2010	Billy Zane, Brandon T. Jackson	Fabolous ("Throw It in the Bag")
40	February 4, 2010	Christian Slater, Alessandra Torresani	Matt Morris ("Love")
41	February 8, 2010	Jamie Foxx and Garry Marshall	N/A
42	February 9, 2010	Topher Grace, Jewel	Jewel ("Stay Here Forever")
43	February 10, 2010	Ashton Kutcher, Emma Roberts, Carter Jenkins	N/A
44	February 11, 2010	Jennifer Garner, Héctor Elizondo	Steel Magnolia ("Keep on Lovin' You")

=== March ===
No.	Original release date	Guest(s)	Musical/entertainment guest(s)
45	March 1, 2010	Dax Shepard, Nicole Eggert, Julia Mancuso	New Boyz
46	March 2, 2010	Tracey Ullman	Bret Michaels
47	March 3, 2010	Mario Lopez, Anjelah Johnson	T-Pain
48	March 4, 2010	Seann William Scott, Andrew Dice Clay, Shaun White	N/A
49	March 8, 2010	Evan Lysacek, Don Cheadle, AnnaLynne McCord, J. Alexander	N/A
50	March 9, 2010	Freddie Prinze, Jr., Stone Cold Steve Austin, Alonzo Mourning	N/A
51	March 10, 2010	Lenny Kravitz, Khloé Kardashian, Lamar Odom	Emilio Estefan
52	March 11, 2010	Ozzy Osbourne, Kendra Wilkinson, Hank Baskett, Alonzo Mourning	N/A
53	March 15, 2010	Shannen Doherty, Jessica Szohr, Louie Psihoyos	Jason DeRulo
54	March 16, 2010	Dominic Monaghan, Kat Von D	Joe Bonamassa (guitarist)
55	March 17, 2010	Wanda Sykes, Peter Facinelli	Loni Love (comedian)
56	March 18, 2010	Andy García, Lance Gross, Johnny Weir	Lucrecia
57	March 22, 2010	Dakota Fanning, Gene Simmons	Boys Like Girls ("Heart Heart Heartbreak")
58	March 23, 2010	David Arquette, Chris Jericho	Trey Songz ("Say Aah")
59	March 24, 2010	Eva Longoria, Sinbad	Eric Andre
60	March 25, 2010	Chad Ochocinco, Johnny Weir	N/A
61	March 29, 2010	Snoop Dogg, Annie Wersching	Foreigner ("Feels Like the First Time", "Hot Blooded")
62	March 30, 2010	Clark Duke, Ludacris	N/A
63	March 31, 2010	Omar Epps, Wendy Williams	Johnny Sanchez (comedian)

=== April ===
No.	Original release date	Guest(s)	Musical/entertainment guest(s)
64	April 1, 2010	Usher, Ron Artest	N/A
65	April 5, 2010	John Corbett, Nicole Scherzinger, Steve Lyons, Mark Littell	N/A
66	April 6, 2010	Rod Blagojevich, Brandy, Ray J.	Saleem Mohammed (comedian)
67	April 7, 2010	Taraji Henson, Bruno Tonioli	George Wallace (comedian)
68	April 8, 2010	Zachary Levi	Slash
69	April 12, 2010	Oscar De La Hoya, Shane Mosley	Chris Rock (comedian)
70	April 13, 2010	Benjamin Bratt, Audrina Partridge	Bryan Kellen (comedian)
71	April 14, 2010	Luke Wilson, Monica	N/A
72	April 15, 2010	James Marsden, Reggie Miller	N/A
73	April 19, 2010	Kara DioGuardi, Cheech and Chong	Jason Reeves
74	April 20, 2010	Brendan Fraser, Angela Kinsey, Jason Aldean	N/A
75	April 21, 2010	Zoe Saldaña, Chris Evans	Lowell Sanders (comedian)
76	April 22, 2010	Jennifer Lopez, Ken Jeong	Ozomatli

=== May ===
No.	Original release date	Guest(s)	Musical/entertainment guest(s)
77	May 17, 2010	Donald Trump, Julie Bowen	Weezer ("Can't Stop Partying")
78	May 18, 2010	Common, Jorge Garcia, Bobby Slayton	N/A
79	May 19, 2010	Chris Noth, Chilli	Allison Iraheta
80	May 20, 2010	Ryan Phillippe, Niecy Nash, Mario Lopez	N/A
81	May 24, 2010	Randy Jackson, Monica Potter	Paper Tongues
82	May 25, 2010	Dennis Quaid, Penn and Teller	N/A
83	May 26, 2010	Nick Cannon	Toni Braxton
84	May 27, 2010	Ben Kingsley, Bret Michaels	Janelle Monáe
85	May 31, 2010	Drew Carey, Marisa Miller	Mike Posner

=== June ===
No.	Original release date	Guest(s)	Musical/entertainment guest(s)
86	June 1, 2010	Adrien Brody, Terry Crews	Hot Chelle Rae
87	June 2, 2010	Jimmy Smits, Cat Deeley, Charlie Murphy	N/A
88	June 3, 2010	Jonah Hill	Peter Frampton
89	June 7, 2010	Russell Brand, Amber Riley	Usher
90	June 8, 2010	Eric Stonestreet	Hanson
91	June 9, 2010	Alfre Woodard	Ice Cube ("I Rep That West")
92	June 10, 2010	Bryan Cranston	Lil Jon (featuring LMFAO)
93	June 14, 2010	Liam Neeson, Bradley Cooper, Sharlto Copley, Quinton "Rampage" Jackson	N/A
94	June 15, 2010	Tim Allen, Padma Lakshmi, Irvin Mayfield, Jim Florentine	N/A
95	June 16, 2010	Jaden Smith, Jackie Chan, Taraji P. Henson	N/A
96	June 17, 2010	Rob Schneider, Mel B.	Crash Kings
97	June 21, 2010	Sharon Osbourne, Jillian Michaels	Ozzy Osbourne
98	June 22, 2010	Helen Mirren, Cedric the Entertainer, Ron Artest	N/A
99	June 23, 2010	Bill Cosby, Blair Underwood, Pau Gasol	Kid 'n Play
100	June 24, 2010	Kobe Bryant, Louis C.K.	N/A
101	June 28, 2010	Jada Pinkett Smith, Jerry Ferrara	Aventura
102	June 29, 2010	Salma Hayek, Charlie Bewley, Booboo Stewart	N/A
103	June 30, 2010	Kristen Stewart, Julia Jones, Billy Burke	Cee-Lo Green

=== July ===
No.	Original release date	Guest(s)	Musical/entertainment guest(s)
104	July 1, 2010	Laurence Fishburne, Peter Facinelli, Elizabeth Reaser	N/A
Spotlight on the stage show "In the Heights"
105	July 12, 2010	Kathy Griffin, The Situation, Vinny Guadagnino, Pauly D, Nicole "Snooki" Polizzi, Ronnie Magro, Sammi Giancola, JWoww, Angelina Pivarnick	N/A
106	July 13, 2010	Kellan Lutz, Missy Peregrym	Clay Walker
107	July 14, 2010	Vivica A. Fox, Booker Forte'	Big Boi ("Follow Us")
108	July 15, 2010	Jeremy Piven, Terrell Owens	Lifehouse ("All In")
109	July 19, 2010	Nicolas Cage, Dania Ramirez, Shorty Rossi	N/A
110	July 20, 2010	Seth Green, Ali Fedotowsky	Travie McCoy, Bruno Mars ("Billionaire")
111	July 21, 2010	America Ferrera, Holly Robinson Peete, Tommy Davidson	N/A
112	July 22, 2010	Tiffani Thiessen	Enrique Iglesias, Pitbull
113	July 26, 2010	Selena Gomez, Wilmer Valderrama, Rob Schneider	N/A
114	July 27, 2010	Steve Carell, Maggie Q.	Backstreet Boys ("If I Knew Then")
115	July 28, 2010	Diddy, Tony Robbins	Diddy-Dirty Money, Rick Ross ("Hello Good Morning")
116	July 29, 2010	Zac Efron	N/A

=== August ===
No.	Original release date	Guest(s)	Musical/entertainment guest(s)
117	August 2, 2010	Jim Parsons, Tricia Helfer	Street Sweeper Social Club
118	August 3, 2010	Luke Wilson, Margaret Cho	Billy Ray Cyrus
119	August 4, 2010	T.I., Idris Elba, Michael Ealy, Taryn Terrell	N/A
120	August 5, 2010	Will Ferrell, Elisabeth Moss	Flo Rida
121	August 9, 2010	Eva Mendes, Josh Hutcherson, Dolph Ziggler	Har Mar Superstar
122	August 10, 2010	Anna Paquin, Randy Orton, R-Truth	N/A
123	August 11, 2010	Mark Wahlberg, Bill Bellamy, David Otunga	N/A
124	August 12, 2010	Gordon Ramsay, Vienna Girardi, The Miz	N/A
125	August 16, 2010	Jason Statham, Aubrey Plaza	Wolfmother
126	August 17, 2010	Dylan McDermott, Kat Von D, Meat Loaf	N/A
127	August 18, 2010	Bow Wow, Lisa Edelstein, Caroline Manzo, Teresa Giudice	tWitch
128	August 19, 2010	Michelle Rodriguez	Ted Nugent
129	August 23, 2010	Justin Long, Michael Strahan	Los Lobos
130	August 24, 2010	Jason Sudeikis, Kim Kardashian, Kourtney Kardashian	Korn ("Let the Guilt Go")
131	August 25, 2010	Drew Barrymore	Fantasia
132	August 26, 2010	Christina Applegate, Charlie Day	Lynyrd Skynyrd

=== September ===
No.	Original release date	Guest(s)	Musical/entertainment guest(s)
133	September 13, 2010	Snoop Dogg, Bethenny Frankel	Goo Goo Dolls
134	September 14, 2010	Ken Jeong, Audrina Partridge	Enrique Iglesias, Juan Luis Guerra
135	September 15, 2010	Danny DeVito, Carmelo Anthony, La La, Chris Spencer	N/A
136	September 16, 2010	Thomas Jane, Tim Gunn	Devo
137	September 20, 2010	Eric Dane, Cloris Leachman	Daughtry
138	September 21, 2010	Kevin Nealon, Kaitlin Olson	Michael Franti, Spearhead
139	September 22, 2010	Anthony Anderson, Morgan Spurlock	Carlos Santana, India.Arie
140	September 23, 2010	Kevin Connolly, The Situation, Rob Schneider	N/A
141	September 27, 2010	LL Cool J, Kelly Osbourne	Santana, Nas
142	September 28, 2010	Rob Morrow, Minka Kelly, Al Madrigal	N/A
143	September 29, 2010	Magic Johnson, Sara Ramirez	Far East Movement
144	September 30, 2010	Tom Bergeron	Seal

=== October ===
No.	Original release date	Guest(s)	Musical/entertainment guest(s)
145	October 18, 2010	Shakira	Neon Trees
146	October 19, 2010	Johnny Knoxville, Bam Margera, Steve-O, Chris Pontius, Whitney Cummings	N/A
147	October 20, 2010	Eva Longoria Parker	John Legend
148	October 21, 2010	Jeff Foxworthy, Chris Webber	N/A
149	October 25, 2010	Bryce Dallas Howard, Criss Angel	N/A
150	October 26, 2010	Bill Maher, Lauren Conrad	Taio Cruz
151	October 27, 2010	Jon Cryer, Patti Stanger	Sean Kingston
152	October 28, 2010	Jenny McCarthy, Eric Balfour	Allstar Weekend

=== November ===
No.	Original release date	Guest(s)	Musical/entertainment guest(s)
153	November 1, 2010	Kathy Griffin, Simon Helberg	OneRepublic
154	November 2, 2010	Mariah Carey, Judah Friedlander, Jon Lajoie	N/A
155	November 3, 2010	William Shatner, Atticus Shaffer	Soulja Boy
156	November 4, 2010	Andy Richter, Katie Cassidy	Good Charlotte
157	November 9, 2010	Janet Jackson, Antoine Dodson	Rooney
158	November 10, 2010	Jamie Foxx, Jayma Mays, Freddy Sanchez	N/A
159	November 11, 2010	Howie Mandel, Juliette Lewis	KT Tunstall
160	November 12, 2010	Denzel Washington, Hilary Duff, Russell Peters	N/A
161	November 16, 2010	Manny Pacquiao	Sheryl Crow
162	November 17, 2010	Kendra Wilkinson	Selena Gomez
163	November 18, 2010	Carrie Ann Inaba, Nina Dobrev	JabbaWockeeZ
164	November 19, 2010	Michael Chiklis, Miranda Cosgrove, Neal Brennan	N/A
165	November 23, 2010	Kris Jenner, Tom Felton	Ne-Yo
166	November 24, 2010	David Arquette, Ashley Greene, Billy Bretherton	N/A
167	November 25, 2010	Billy Bob Thornton; Kunal Nayyar	Ice Cube
168	November 26, 2010	Dwayne Johnson, Katie Cassidy, Felipe Esparza	N/A
169	November 30, 2010	Zachary Levi, Perez Hilton	3OH!3

=== December ===
No.	Original release date	Guest(s)	Musical/entertainment guest(s)
170	December 1, 2010	Bill Cosby, Angela Kinsey	Atomic Tom
171	December 2, 2010	Charles Barkley, Brandy	Cee Lo Green
172	December 3, 2010	Mario Lopez, Kathryn Hahn, Chris D'Elia	N/A
173	December 7, 2010	Khloe Kardashian, Jo Frost,	Nicki Minaj
174	December 8, 2010	Bob Saget, NeNe Leakes	Keri Hilson
175	December 9, 2010	Alan Cumming, Chris D'Elia	N/A
176	December 10, 2010	Steve Harvey	The 88
177	December 14, 2010	Eric Stonestreet, J.B. Smoove, Dov Davidoff	N/A
178	December 15, 2010	Anna Faris, Apolo Anton Ohno	Natasha Bedingfield
179	December 16, 2010	Mila Kunis, Drew Pinsky	Chrisette Michele
180	December 17, 2010	Justin Timberlake, Stephen Dorff	Ciara
181	December 21, 2010	Xzibit	Cirque du Soleil
182	December 22, 2010	Gene Simmons, Scott Bakula	Bettye LaVette
183	December 23, 2010	Ron Artest, Deon Cole	will.i.am
184	December 24, 2010	Jack Black, Hailee Steinfeld	Filter

== 2011 ==
=== January ===
No.	Original release date	Guest(s)	Musical/entertainment guest(s)
185	January 11, 2011	Lauren Graham, Will Sasso	Plain White T's ("Rhythm of Love")
186	January 12, 2011	Jesse Tyler Ferguson, Mary Lynn Rajskub, Maz Jobrani	N/A
187	January 13, 2011	Roseanne Barr, Danny Pudi	El DeBarge, Faith Evans ("Lay with You")
188	January 14, 2011	David Duchovny, Kimora Lee Simmons	Saving Abel
189	January 18, 2011	Seth Rogen, Ginnifer Goodwin	Sick Puppies ("Maybe")
190	January 19, 2011	William H. Macy, Camille Grammer	Cali Swag District ("Kickback", "Teach Me How to Dougie")
191	January 20, 2011	Cameron Diaz, Jason Priestley, Luke Perry, Greg Fitzsimmons	N/A
192	January 21, 2011	Bill Engvall, Johnny Weir	My Chemical Romance ("Vampire Money")
193	January 25, 2011	Ashley Tisdale, Kevin Hart	Grace Potter and the Nocturnals ("Paris (Ooh La La)")
194	January 26, 2011	Vanessa Williams, Shorty Rossi, Bret Ernst	N/A
195	January 27, 2011	Jason Statham, Busy Philipps	Wiz Khalifa ("Black and Yellow")
196	January 28, 2011	Jennifer Love Hewitt, Guy Fieri, Brian Wilson	N/A

=== February ===
No.	Original release date	Guest(s)	Musical/entertainment guest(s)
197	February 1, 2011	Kristen Bell, Jake Johnson,	Slash ("Brown Sugar")
198	February 2, 2011	Kourtney Kardashian, DeSean Jackson	The Thermals
199	February 3, 2011	Mindy Kaling, Derek Fisher	Jasper Redd
200	February 4, 2011	Billy Gardell, Rachel Bilson	OK Go
201	February 8, 2011	Aubrey Plaza	Jamie Foxx
202	February 9, 2011	Channing Tatum, Margaret Cho	50 Cent, Governor
203	February 10, 2011	Joan Rivers, Greg Jennings, Baron Vaughn	N/A
204	February 11, 2011	Brad Womack, Taylor Momsen	The Pretty Reckless
205	February 15, 2011	Paul Wesley, James Loney, Bobby Castillo	R. Kelly
"The Real Housewives of Orange County"
206	February 16, 2011	Justin Bieber, Diane Kruger	Jim Jefferies
207	February 17, 2011	Liam Neeson, Eddie Griffin	N/A
The Broadway Show "Rock of Ages"
208	February 18, 2011	Hayden Panettiere, JWoww, Jim Jefferies	N/A
209	February 22, 2011	Amar'e Stoudemire, Kate Gosselin, Sebastian Maniscalco	N/A
210	February 23, 2011	Martin Lawrence, Jared Leto	Thirty Seconds to Mars
211	February 24, 2011	Trevor Bayne, Jessica Lucas	Bobby V, Bobby Brown
212	February 25, 2011	Anne Heche, Jason Biggs, Addi Somekh, Brian Asman	N/A

=== March ===
No.	Original release date	Guest(s)	Musical/entertainment guest(s)
213	March 1, 2011	Owen Wilson, Aly Michalka	Terry Fator
214	March 2, 2011	Cheryl Burke, Brandon T. Jackson	John Popper and the Duskray Troubadours ("Something Sweet")
215	March 3, 2011	Pauly D, Michelle Rodriguez, Ron Artest	Future Funk
216	March 4, 2011	Topher Grace, Scott Disick	Cake
217	March 8, 2011	Forest Whitaker, Donald Glover	Steel Train
218	March 9, 2011	Aaron Eckhart, Malin Akerman	Eric Andre
219	March 10, 2011	Jerry O'Connell, Curtis Stone	Lupe Fiasco ("The Show Goes On")
220	March 11, 2011	Pee-wee Herman, Emmanuelle Chriqui, Kody Brown, Meri Brown, Christine Brown, Robyn Sullivan	N/A
221	March 22, 2011	Mike Tyson, Emmy Rossum	Jeff Ross
222	March 23, 2011	Tori Spelling, Dean McDermott, Jim Rome	Hollywood Undead ("Hear Me Now"), Boney James
223	March 24, 2011	Matthew McConaughey, Micky Ward	Ron Artest, Fat Joe, B-Real, Lenny Santos, Max Santos ("Go Loco")
224	March 29, 2011	Bethenny Frankel, D. L. Hughley	Seether ("Country Song")
225	March 30, 2011	Vanessa Hudgens, Rob Dyrdek	Sérgio Mendes ("Mas que Nada")
226	March 31, 2011	Larry King, Romeo, Brent Weinbach	N/A

=== April ===
No.	Original release date	Guest(s)	Musical/entertainment guest(s)
227	April 1, 2011	Brittany Snow	Snoop Dogg
228	April 5, 2011	Rainn Wilson, Lil Jon	Panic! at the Disco
229	April 6, 2011	Drew Carey, Sarah Shahi	Quinn Dahle
230	April 7, 2011	Terrence Howard, Lisa Lampanelli, Joey Rodriguez	N/A
231	April 8, 2011	Danny McBride, Camilla Luddington	Nick Carter
232	April 12, 2011	Russell Brand, Leslie Mann	Maná
233	April 13, 2011	Christian Slater, Damon Wayans, Jr., Omid Djalili	N/A
234	April 14, 2011	Rosario Dawson	Prince
235	April 15, 2011	Anne Hathaway, Anthony Anderson	Sum 41 ("Screaming Bloody Murder")
236	April 19, 2011	Tracy Morgan, Judy Greer	REO Speedwagon
237	April 20, 2011	Dax Shepard, Meat Loaf	Lee DeWyze
238	April 21, 2011	Dwayne Johnson, Cat Deeley	Kimberly Clark, Zakk Wylde
239	April 22, 2011	Tyler Perry, Maria Menounos	Lauren Pritchard

=== May ===
No.	Original release date	Guest(s)	Musical/entertainment guest(s)
240	May 3, 2011	Mark Ruffalo, Yvette Nicole Brown	Rex Navarrete
241	May 4, 2011	Kaley Cuoco, Idris Elba	2AM Club
242	May 5, 2011	Paul Walker, Mike Rowe	Julius Sharpe
243	May 6, 2011	Eva Mendes, Mike Epps	Carlos Santana
244	May 10, 2011	Sinbad, Heidi Montag	Jonny Lang, Brad Whitford, Chris Layton ("All Along the Watchtower")
245	May 11, 2011	Ice Cube, Chris Hemsworth	Earthquake
246	May 12, 2011	Nick Cannon, Bruno Tonioli	Musiq Soulchild
247	May 13, 2011	Enrique Iglesias, Ralph Macchio	Def Leppard
248	May 17, 2011	Eva Longoria, Ellie Kemper	Fitz and the Tantrums
249	May 18, 2011	Chris Colfer, Shane Mosley	Ian Edwards
250	May 19, 2011	Will Ferrell, Niecy Nash	Sheila E and the E Family
251	May 24, 2011	Norm Macdonald, Jerry Springer, Don Gorske	Game, Skeetox
252	May 25, 2011	Jack Black, Elisha Cuthbert	The Script
253	May 26, 2011	Ken Jeong, Kara DioGuardi, John Belitsky, Dan Wuebben, Mohammad Alam	N/A
254	May 27, 2011	Randy Jackson, Russell Peters, Paul Stanley	N/A

=== June ===
No.	Original release date	Guest(s)	Musical/entertainment guest(s)
255	June 7, 2011	David Arquette, Toni Braxton	LMFAO
256	June 8, 2011	Mike Brown, Ice-T, Coco, Joey Chestnut	Neon Trees
257	June 9, 2011	Don Cheadle, Terry Crews	James Adomian
258	June 10, 2011	Conan O'Brien, Crystal Reed	Barry Manilow
259	June 14, 2011	Adam Carolla, Mary Murphy, Hart Main	Marc Broussard
260	June 15, 2011	Cheech Marin, Steve-O	...And You Will Know Us by the Trail of Dead
261	June 16, 2011	Cee Lo Green, J. J. Abrams	Brandon Scott Wolf, MC Lyte
262	June 17, 2011	Padma Lakshmi, Lucy Punch	Deftones ("You've Seen the Butcher")
263	June 21, 2011	J. J. Barea, Shawn Marion, Sam Trammell	Sharon Jones & The Dap-Kings
264	June 22, 2011	Paris Hilton, Simon Pegg, June Gregg	Augustana
265	June 23, 2011	Marc Anthony, Rocco DiSpirito	Michelle Buteau
266	June 24, 2011	Zachary Levi, Don Mattingly	Pitbull, Ne-Yo
267	June 28, 2011	Larry the Cable Guy, Gabrielle Anwar	Lloyd
268	June 29, 2011	Andy Richter, Constance Marie	Eliza Doolittle
269	June 30, 2011	Cedric the Entertainer, Jeff Lewis, Steve Mehren	N/A

=== July ===
No.	Original release date	Guest(s)	Musical/entertainment guest(s)
270	July 1, 2011	Patrick Dempsey, Tom Papa	David Cook
271	July 19, 2011	Piers Morgan, Kunal Nayyar	Jordan Knight
272	July 20, 2011	Noah Wyle, Billy Ray Cyrus	Los Lonely Boys
273	July 21, 2011	Khloe Kardashian-Odom, Rob Kardashian, Michael Rapaport	Chris Spencer
274	July 22, 2011	Hope Solo, Ashley Herbert	3 Doors Down
275	July 26, 2011	Mark-Paul Gosselaar, Amir Khan	Ringling Bros. and Barnum & Bailey Circus
276	July 27, 2011	Tim Gunn, Jenna Elfman	Shaggy
Spotlight on national air-guitar winners
277	July 28, 2011	Kate Walsh, The Miz	Austin Brown
278	July 29, 2011	Chris Tucker, Matt Kemp	Jarrod Harris

=== August ===
No.	Original release date	Guest(s)	Musical/entertainment guest(s)
279	August 2, 2011	Jon Favreau, Aaron Paul	Colbie Caillat
280	August 3, 2011	Kathy Griffin, Tom Felton	Lavell Crawford, 2Cellos
281	August 4, 2011	Adrian Grenier, Affion Crockett	Matt Nathanson
282	August 5, 2011	Hank Azaria	Nicole Scherzinger
283	August 9, 2011	Kathryn Hahn	Joe Jonas
284	August 10, 2011	Roseanne Barr, Michael Pena	Rival Sons
285	August 11, 2011	Jessica Alba, David Koechner	Ellie Goulding ("Lights")
286	August 12, 2011	Raven-Symoné	Auggie Smith
