= Jason Donaghy =

Irish recording engineer

- Occupation: Audio Engineer
- Website: http://jasondonaghy.com/engineer-mixer-producer

Jason Donaghy is a two-time Grammy nominated recording engineer, mixer, and producer, who has done work with artists including Band of Horses, Ryan Adams, and Josh Ritter, among others. Hailing from Dublin, he currently resides in Los Angeles, California, where he has garnered two Grammy nominations; for his work on Band of Horses' third record, Infinite Arms, and Sum 41's fifth record, Screaming Bloody Murder, respectively, while at Perfect Sound Studios.

== Selected discography ==
| Year | Band | Album |
|---|---|---|
| 2008 | Josh Ritter | In the Dark: Live at Vicar Street |
| 2010 | Band of Horses | Infinite Arms |
| 2010 | Rob Zombie | Hellbilly Deluxe 2 |
| 2011 | Sum 41 | Screaming Bloody Murder |

== Singles ==
| Year | Band | Single | Album |
|---|---|---|---|
| 2011 | Ryan Adams | Empty Room | non-album single |
