= Danny Smith (actor) =

Canadian actor (born 1973)

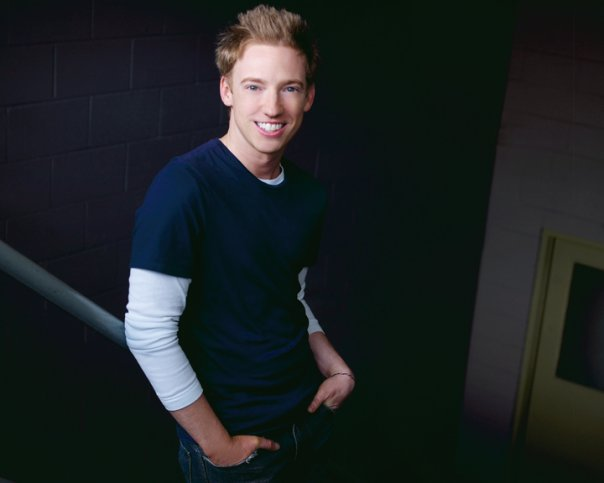
- Born: October 2, 1973 (age 52); Montreal, Quebec, Canada
- Occupations: Actor, musician
- Years active: 1993–present

Daniel Arthur Smith (born October 2, 1973) is a Canadian actor.

== Life and career ==
Smith was born in Montreal, Quebec and moved to Pickering, Ontario at age seven. After high school productions of Joseph and the Amazing Technicolor Dreamcoat (Joseph), The Little Shop of Horrors (Seymour), and The Wizard of Oz (The Cowardly Lion), he began working at Stage West in Mississauga, Ontario and was in dinner theater for a year. He studied and performed at The Second City in Toronto, working with SCTV legend Joe Flaherty. That led to various television and film roles. Smith wrote and performed the theme song to the TV series Big Wolf on Campus.

Smith appeared on the CBS game show The Price Is Right on March 27, 2001. He won the show including the showcase taking home US$31,000 worth of prizes including a car.

After Big Wolf on Campus ended in 2002, Smith starred in the film The Bail; however, that film went unreleased. After acting in The Bail (alternately titled Fizzy Bizness), Smith moved to Los Angeles to pursue a musical career. From 2003 to 2009, he was the singer, songwriter, and guitarist for the band The City Drive. The band parted ways in 2009, and he returned to Toronto pursuing his acting career. In 2010 he began appearing in commercials for Telus, including one in 2011 where he appears with Leonard Nimoy.

== Filmography ==
Film/Television
| 2021–2023 | Go, Dog. Go! | Yellow (voice) | Minor role |
| 2020 | Kingdom Force | Max Volume (voice) | Recurring |
| 2019 | Corn & Peg | Clyde (voice) | Guest role |
| 2015–2019 | Kuu Kuu Harajuku | Rudolph "Rudie" Rhodes (voice) | Main role |
| 2014 | I Put a Hit on You | Hitman | |
| 2012–2016 | Fugget About It | Petey Falcone (voice) | Main role |
| 2011 | Hello October | Daniel | Post-production |
| 2010 | The Ron James Show | Baristo | Episode 2.1 |
| 2010 | Harriet the Spy: Blog Wars | Tim | TV film |
| 2009 | Suck | Jerry | |
| 2009 | Deadliest Sea | Ensign Mac | TV film |
| 2009 | The Listener | Poker Player #1 | Episode: "Missing" |
| 2007 | Super Why! | Monty The Monster, Monkey Drummer (Voice) | Episode: "The Ant and the Grasshopper" |
| 2005 | Fizzy Bizness | | |
| 2001 | The Bail | Benji Berg | |
| 1999–2002 | Big Wolf on Campus | Merton Dingle | Series Regular |
| 1998 | Boy Meets Girl | Unknown | |
| 1998 | The Hairy Bird | Groundhog – Flat Critter | Also released as Strike! and All I Wanna Do |
| 1998 | The Big Hit | Video Store Kid | |
| 1998 | White Lies | Khaki Kid | |
| 1996–1999 | Jonovision | | 5 episodes |
| 1995 | Sugartime | Stagehand | |
| 1995 | National Lampoon's Senior Trip | Barry "Virus" Kremmer | |
| 1995 | Open Season | Buck Greene, Rookie Messenger | |
| 1995 | Who Rules? | Unknown | |
| 1993–1994 | It's Alive! | Sketch Performer | 4 episodes |
| 1994 | PCU | Superguy | Uncredited |
| 1993 | Class of '96 | Student | Episode: "Howie Farr Is Too Far" |
