= The City Drive =

American pop/rock band

- Origin: Los Angeles, California, U.S.
- Genres: Pop rock Pop punk Alternative rock Rock and roll
- Years active: 2003–2010, 2016
- Labels: We the People; Sony/BMG
- Members: Danny Smith; Chris Perry; Marc Precilla; Scott Waldman
- Website: thecitydrivemusic.com

The City Drive was a Los Angeles-based pop rock band fronted by the actor Danny Smith (vocals, guitar). Other members were Chris Perry (lead guitar, backing vocals), Marc Precilla (drums) and Scott Waldman (bass guitar, backing vocals) who was later replaced by Jake Rodenhouse. They recorded with producers such as Mike Green (Yellowcard, Rufio) and Chris Fudurich (Jimmy Eat World, RX Bandits).

== Career ==
In March 2004, The City Drive performed on the opening night of the South by Southwest in Austin, Texas. In June, they joined the Nokia Core Tour.

In December 2004, The City Drive signed a record deal with We The People/Sony Records. They spent 2005 touring and recording their first, full-length CD, Always Moving Never Stopping, with Chris Fudurich which features backing vocals by Rachel Haden.

The City Drive played dates on the Vans Warped Tour for the first time in summer 2006, not long after opening for the multi-platinum-selling artist Hoobastank. Later that year, The City Drive toured the east coast with Allister and Self Against City, and embarked on a national tour with Las Vegas band Fletch. The album, Always Moving Never Stopping, was released on June 27, 2006.

The band's music has been heard on television (Celebrity Poker Showdown, Runaway) in major motion pictures (Yours, Mine and Ours, American Pie Presents: Band Camp) and appeared in the music publication Alternative Press magazine.

In 2007, Waldman left the band and went on to pursue his own music, forming a band called Lido Beach, and eventually started an artist management company, representing artists from such bands as AFI, The All-American Rejects, Blue October, Sum 41, and more. He was replaced by Rodenhouse.

On January 28, 2009, Smith officially announced the band's breakup on The City Drive's MySpace page, stating that they had parted ways shortly after being dropped from Sony Records.

The band announced a ten-year reunion show scheduled for January 15, 2016. The show, which took place at The Mint in Los Angeles, featured the original band lineup, including Scott Waldman on bass guitar, playing the entirety of the Always Moving, Never Stopping album. Fans of the band traveled from as far as Texas, Florida, Massachusetts, and even Denmark. The band has no current plans for any other shows.

== Discography ==
1. Always Moving Never Stopping – June 27, 2006
2. Egocentral EP – May 15, 2007
