= Baby You Don't Wanna Know =

Single by Sum 41

from the album Screaming Bloody Murder
- Released: June 15, 2011
- Recorded: April 2010 at EastWest Studios, Hollywood, Los Angeles, CA
- Genre: Rock and roll; garage rock
- Length: 3:34
- Label: Island
- Songwriters: Deryck Whibley; Matt Squire
- Producer: Deryck Whibley

Sum 41 singles chronology
"Screaming Bloody Murder" (2011)	"Baby You Don't Wanna Know" (2011)	"Fake My Own Death" (2016)

"Baby You Don't Wanna Know" is the second single from Sum 41's fifth studio album Screaming Bloody Murder, officially released as a Canadian radio single on June 15, 2011, and later worldwide, along with a music video, on August 3, 2011.

== Background ==
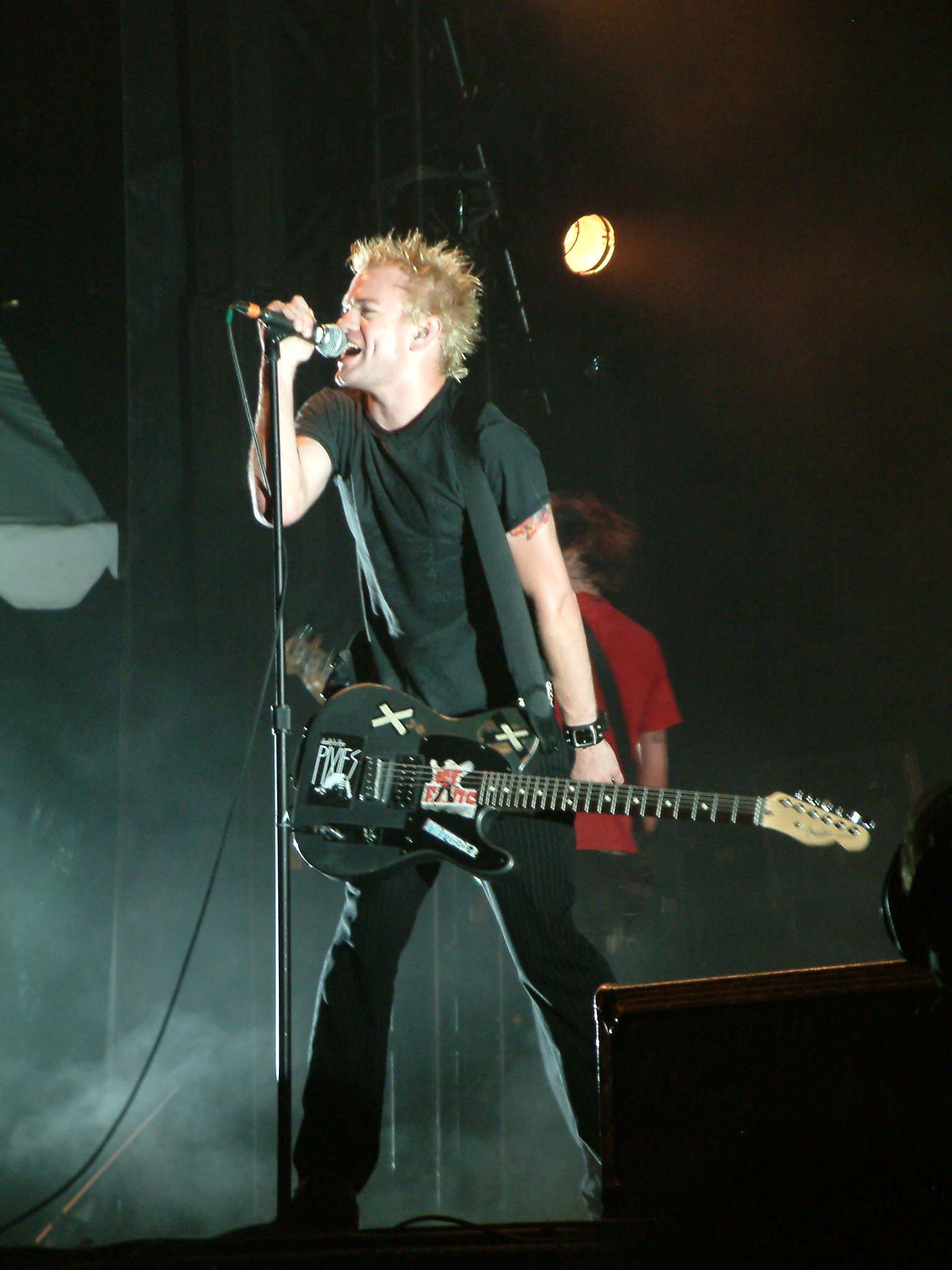
Deryck Whibley at the Ottawa Bluesfest.

As confirmed on Sum 41's Screaming Bloody Murder making of documentary Don't Try This at Home, "Baby You Don't Wanna Know", along with "Time for You to Go", was one of the two songs that were written and recorded by the band at the last minute, on April 7, 2010, at EastWest Studios in Hollywood, California. The song, co-written by Matt Squire, was added to the album at the last minute and its recording was funded by Deryck Whibley himself, as the label refused to pay for any more songs for the album.

As said by Todd Morse on Don't Try This at Home, the song's style was more in the vein of classic rock and "straight-up-rock and roll", taking influence from the Rolling Stones and the Beatles, as opposed to all the other songs that were written during 2008–2009, that resulted in a more "dark" alternative rock style.

In an interview with the band during their European tour in July 2011, the band has commented that they considered releasing either "Blood in My Eyes" or "Back Where I Belong" as the second single, but opted to release "Baby You Don't Wanna Know" instead, as it was more radio friendly.

== Music video ==
On June 28, 2011, Sum 41's Twitter has announced that the band shot a music video for "Baby You Don't Wanna Know" during a day off in Germany, to be released in the coming month. In July 2011, band assistant Matt Whibley has confirmed that the music video was shot with a local German crew and is low budget. On August 3, 2011, the band premiered the music video for the song exclusively on German website Myvideo.de. A day later, it premiered on VEVO and YouTube, for worldwide audiences.

== Live performances ==
The band performed the song live for the first time on June 22, 2011, in Angers, France, during the band's summer European leg of the Screaming Bloody Murder Tour. The song was since then performed at various other concerts, and although being an official single, the band does not perform it on every date. It was performed on and off until August 2011, and hasn't been played again when the band resumed the tour in 2012.

== Promotional use ==
It is also on the soundtrack of the 2011 film Green Lantern.

== Track listing ==
Digital download
No.	Title	Length
1.	"Baby You Don't Wanna Know"	3:34

== Charts ==
Chart (2011)	Peak position
Canada Rock (Billboard)	24

== Release history ==
Release history and formats for "Baby You Don't Wanna Know"
Region	Date	Format
Canada	June 15, 2011	Airplay
Europe	August 3, 2011	Airplay
