= Blood in My Eyes =

Promotional single by Sum 41

from the album Screaming Bloody Murder
- Released: September 10, 2012
- Recorded: January 26–June 24, 2010 at
- Studio: Capitol (Hollywood); Perfect Sound (Hollywood); Mr. Biz (Hollywood)
- Genre: Melodic hardcore
- Length: 4:16
- Label: Island
- Songwriter(s): Deryck Whibley
- Producer(s): Deryck Whibley

"Blood in My Eyes" is a song taken from Sum 41's fifth studio album Screaming Bloody Murder, officially released on September 10, 2012. It failed to chart despite being nominated for a Grammy Award.

== Music video ==
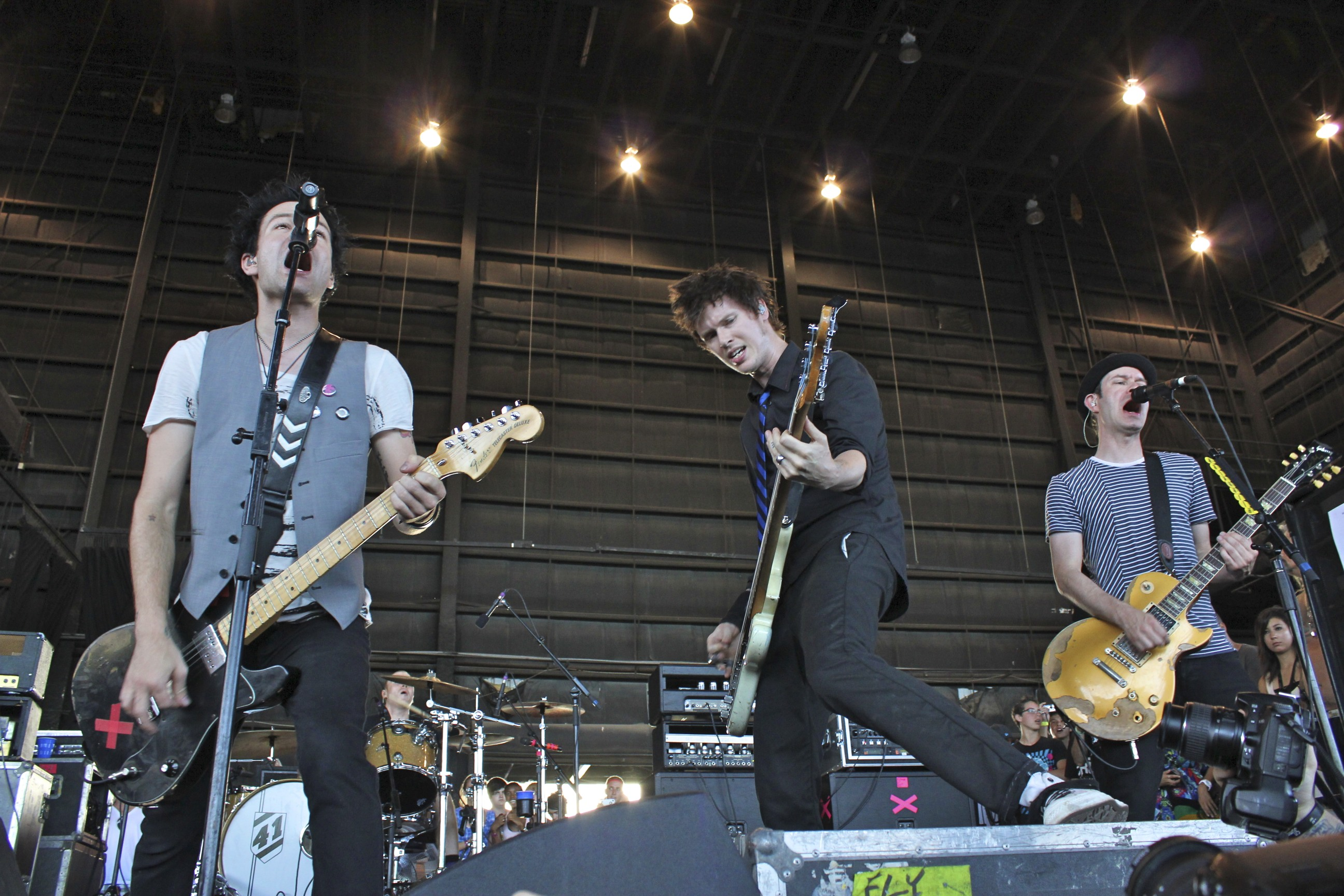
Sum 41 at the West Palm Beach Warped Tour 2010.

On February 24, 2012, it was announced on the band's Twitter that during that week the band would be shooting a music video for the song "Blood in My Eyes" with director Michael Maxxis in Los Angeles, confirming that it would be the third single from the album. Shooting of the video took place on February 29, 2012, at the desert around the Los Angeles area. On March 19, 2012, it was announced on the band's Twitter that the 1st cut of the music video was ready, and that the video will be shortly released and some changes will be made. On April 18, 2012, it was announced on the band's Twitter that the band will be doing additional shooting for the music video in the upcoming weekend. On September 6, 2012, the band announced that the music video will be finally released on September 10, 2012.

The music video shows a woman hitchhiking (portrayed by Ciara Hanna), attempting to catch a ride when a man pulls over. After getting in the car, the two talk shortly before the man begins to violently attack the woman, repeatedly punching her and bashing her face against the car window, knocking her bloody and unconscious. He drives her out to the middle of the Mojave Desert, drags her away from the car, strips her down to her underwear, and drives off, leaving her with only her driver's license (which identifies her as "Jessica Kill"). She awakens, and begins to wander around until she stumbles upon the attacker's car. She realizes that she is at his house, and peers into his window, seeing him and an older woman (possibly his mother) inside the house. The viewer is then shown that the assailant had raped Jessica before he abandoned her. Armed with a shovel, she knocks on the door and it is answered by the older woman. Jessica knocks the older woman unconscious before attacking the man who raped her, hitting him with the shovel multiple times and (presumably) killing him.

It is the band’s last video to feature drummer Steve Jocz before his departure from the band in 2013.

== Critical reception ==
The song has received mostly positive feedback from critics. Under The Gun was very positive of the song, saying "Venomous, rasping, and brutal, it’s the incandescent anger to offset the forlorn sense of loss that has gone before. The vocals are stunning and the music fittingly forceful in support, with some exquisite harmonies added during the verses to balance things out a little." Diamond in the Rock called the song "the best on the album", saying that it "kicks things back into high gear with yet another epic guitar/drum intro. The tempo slows for the verses as the battle drums build up the tension that is released in a slower, fist-pumping chorus. This chorus is followed by more rapid-fire guitar riffs and drumming while Jason McCaslin gets a chance to show his skills on the bass during the jaw-dropping bridge, one of the most transcendent moments on the album. Whibley’s vocals fluctuate perfectly to reflect the intensity of his instrumental ensemble." However, Punknews was negative of the song, saying "'Blood in My Eyes' could have been an awesome song, but there is just so much going on within it that it doesn't really know what direction to take and ends up falling apart."

== Accolades ==
On November 30, 2011, Sum 41 was nominated for a Grammy Award for Best Hard Rock/Metal Performance for the song "Blood in My Eyes". However, on February 12, 2012, Foo Fighters' "White Limo" won.

== Track listing ==
Promo CD
No.	Title	Length
1.	"Blood in My Eyes"	4:16
