= Lopez Tonight =

American late-night talk show (2009–2011)

- Created by: George Lopez
- Starring: George Lopez
- Music by: Michael Bearden and the Ese Vatos
- Opening theme: "Low Rider" by War
- Country of origin: United States
- Original language: English
- No. of seasons: 2
- No. of episodes: 286 (list of episodes)

Production
- Executive producers: George Lopez; Robert Morton
- Running time: 60 minutes (with commercials)
- Production companies: 2.2 Productions; Panamort Television; ParaMedia; Telepictures Productions; Warner Horizon Television

Original release
- Network: TBS
- Release: November 9, 2009 – August 12, 2011

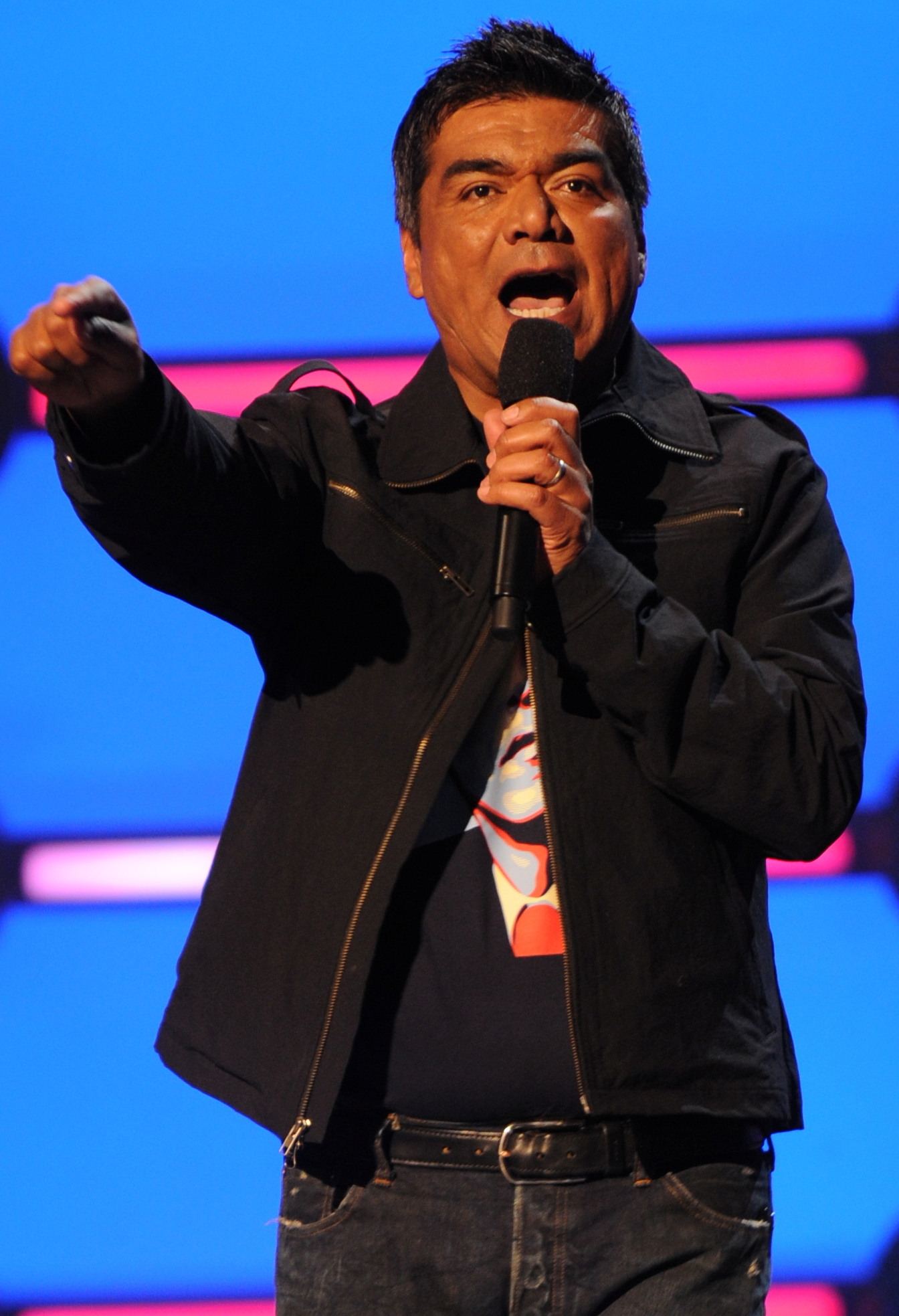
Lopez at the Kids' Inaugural: We are the Future concert in 2009

Lopez Tonight is an American late-night television talk show that was hosted by the comedian George Lopez. The hour-long program premiered on November 9, 2009, on cable network TBS. Lopez was the first Mexican-American to host a late-night talk show on an English-language network in the United States. The show featured audience interaction using a high-energy format. The program aired Monday through Thursday. At first it aired at 11 PM, but in November 2010 when Conan O'Brien started his own talk show on TBS, Lopez Tonight was pushed back to midnight Eastern and Pacific. On August 10, 2011, TBS announced that Lopez Tonight would be canceled. The final episode aired two days later on August 12, 2011.

== History ==
Phillip Kent, the chief executive of TBS, announced in March 2009 that George Lopez had signed a contract to host his own late-night talk show on TBS in November of that year. During interviews, Lopez said that he would bring the change to late-night television and that he wants the show to reach a diverse audience. He also stated that he would become the first Hispanic American to host a late-night talk show. The show debuted on November 9, 2009, with guests Kobe Bryant and Eva Longoria, as well as a special appearance from Ellen DeGeneres and a musical performance from Carlos Santana.

=== Arrival of Conan O'Brien and cancellation ===
The 2010 Tonight Show conflict resulted in Conan O'Brien's departure from NBC and The Tonight Show. Jay Leno returned to The Tonight Show, abandoning his prime time experiment, The Jay Leno Show. As a part of his severance deal, O'Brien was given a $32-million payout, a $12-million payout for his show's staff, and the ability to pursue options on other channels after September 1, 2010.

Hours before O'Brien's Legally Prohibited from Being Funny on Television Tour, O'Brien officially announced he had signed with TBS to create his own late-night talk show at 11:00 pm beginning in November 2010, thus pushing Lopez Tonight back to midnight. O'Brien was hesitant at first, saying he didn't want to do that to Lopez after what NBC had done to him, but Lopez himself called him and persuaded him to take the job. On the April 12 edition of Lopez Tonight, George addressed the situation by saying, "I was on Team Coco, now I'm on Team Loco!".

However, the move caused a steep decline in ratings. On August 10, 2011, TBS canceled Lopez Tonight effective at the end of the week. O'Brien said of the announcement on his show, taping just hours after it was confirmed:

"I want to take one second right now and talk about something serious. Today, not long ago—a couple of hours ago—it was announced that TBS is not renewing George Lopez's show for a third season. I have very strong feelings about this, and I wanted to talk about it. Had it not been for George being so incredibly supportive of me a year and a half ago, I would not have come to TBS and we would not be doing this show right now. I owe that man a lot, and frankly, it makes me very sad that TBS and George could not work this out. I really like being a part of a late-night lineup with George, and I wish that this could've continued. So, tonight, all of our thoughts are with George and his entire staff and crew. We understand, believe me, how hard this is for all of you, and we wish you all the best."

== Format ==
The show followed the established six-piece format established by the likes of Steve Allen and Johnny Carson. The first segment included a monologue by Lopez, sometimes accompanied by several one-liners, or several brief comedy sketches. Most episodes also included a second segment, immediately after the monologue, with a full comedy sketch. An interview with either one or two guests followed, as well as a musical or comedy performance.

== Recurring segments ==
Sketches introduced on the show include Bullet Wound or Not a Bullet Wound, a stereotypical game show similar to Jay Leno's "Jaywalking" where guests must answer seemingly racist questions, Creepy Little White Girl in which a horrific little girl appears on the stage to deliver bad news, The Jersey Shore Presents, a mocking piece where cast members of Jersey Shore star in hit movies, Sweet Tweets where Lopez answers questions submitted from Twitter, WWE Superstars Karaoke where many WWE Superstars performed karaoke songs, Justin Bieber's Memories a segment that mocks Justin Bieber and his childhood, and Eric Estrada where colored lights flash and various guests, including Benjamin Bratt and Jon Cryer come out of the double doors in a California Highway Patrol motorcycle uniform.

== Timeline ==
- November 9, 2009 — Lopez Tonight debuts with guests Eva Longoria and Kobe Bryant as well as a special appearance by Ellen DeGeneres, and a musical performance from Carlos Santana, who performed "Oye Como Va".
- November 12, 2009 — Comedian Larry David appears on the show and takes a DNA test revealing his results to be 63 percent European and 37 percent Native American.
- November 25, 2009 — George officially announces that Arsenio Hall would become the permanent guest host of Lopez Tonight.
- December 15, 2009 — A special reunion episode, featuring the main cast of George Lopez. Musical guests War performed "Low Rider", the theme song to the former show as well as Lopez Tonight.
- January 18, 2010 — Jennifer Lopez performs the opening monologue for Lopez Tonight, addressing the 2010 Tonight Show conflict, beginning with "Welcome to Lopez Tonight, where nobody gets fired, they just get replaced by a bigger star with the same last name"!
- April 1, 2010 — As part of an April Fool's Day joke, musician Usher corrected Lopez after incorrectly stating he had two kids, saying that he had three, and went on to say that how upset he was when people didn't get their facts straight, however Usher revealed it to be a joke and that he did indeed have two kids.
- April 12, 2010 — George Lopez announces that beginning in November 2010, Conan O'Brien will officially join TBS for his own late-night talk show which will push Lopez Tonight back one hour from 11:00 pm to midnight.
- June 24, 2010 – Lopez Tonight celebrates its 100th episode, with guests Kobe Bryant and Louis C.K. with special appearances from Arsenio Hall, Clint Eastwood, Tom Cruise, Donald Trump, Russell Brand, and Eddie Van Halen. At the end of the show, George alongside his band performed the Van Halen song "Panama".
- August 18, 2010 – George Lopez bets Bow Wow $25,000 to charity that the Los Angeles Lakers would beat the Miami Heat on Christmas Day.
- October 19, 2010 – The cast of Jackass 3D appears on the show.
- November 3, 2010 – Conan O'Brien officially appears on the show promoting his new talk show, Conan, which moves Lopez Tonight to midnight.
- November 4, 2010 – Lopez Tonight celebrates its last show in the 11:00PM time slot as it prepares to move to 12:00AM in order to facilitate the arrival of Conan. Guests on the show were Andy Richter, Bret Michaels, and a musical performance from Good Charlotte.
- November 8, 2010 – Lopez Tonight airs its first show in the midnight time slot. The show features many changes including a new opening sequence as well as a new set. Guests on the show included Janet Jackson, Antoine Dodson, and a musical performance from Rooney.
- August 10, 2011 – Lopez Tonight is canceled by TBS with the series finale airing August 12, 2011.
- August 15, 2011 – Repeats of The Office filled in the former Lopez Tonight timeslot after several weeks of his show repeats.
- August 18, 2011 – The official TBS Lopez Tonight website was taken down and currently redirects the site to tbs.com.

== Production ==
=== Studio and set design ===
The show was taped at Warner Bros. Studios in Burbank, California, near The Ellen DeGeneres Show studio. The stage layout followed a street-party theme. The show differed from many other late-night talk shows, most notably for not featuring a desk or background of the city in which the show is taped.

=== House band ===
Lopez Tonight's house band was Michael Bearden and the Ese Vatos, who are famous for performances with Michael Jackson and Shakira. The band consisted of leader and keyboard player Michael Bearden, guitarist Tommy Organ, bass player Alex Al, percussionist Lenny Castro, trumpeter Bill Churchville, drummer Robin DiMaggio, and saxophonist Sean Holt. As in common talk show format, Michael Bearden and the Ese Vatos would perform the show's opening and closing theme, bumpers into and out of commercial breaks. The show's opening theme was "Lowrider" by the band War, which was also the theme song for George Lopez.

== Reception ==
The show has been critically panned. Metacritic scored the show with a 39/100 based on six reviews. Matthew Gilbert of The Boston Globe claims "Lopez has a full-throated energy and a weakness for sophomoric guy humor that can be grating, especially since his show will air Monday through Thursday nights." The New York Times says "Mr. Lopez said he was 'bringing change to late-night TV,' but the only significant change was a coarsening of the already crass atmosphere."

== See also ==
- List of Lopez Tonight episodes
