= Jake Rodenhouse =

American record producer (born 1982)

John William Rodenhouse III
- Also known as: Jimmy Buckets
- Born: January 6, 1982 (age 44)
- Instruments: Guitar, bass guitar, drum set
- Label: Perfect Sound Studios
- Formerly of: The City Drive
- Website: www.perfectsoundstudios.com

Jake Rodenhouse is a record producer and multi-instrumentalist, and the founder of Perfect Sound Studios. He was also a member of the band The City Drive. He currently resides in Hollywood, California.

Between 2002 and 2004, Jake combined efforts with Dave Drago to operate the Hopewell Recording Studio in Canandaigua, New York; a foray self described as a "project studio." It recorded artists predominantly from the Rochester area. While the studio is no longer recording, its website remains for archiving purposes.

Once finished with the Canandaigua studio, Jake moved to Los Angeles, California, where he met Chris Perry and eventually became a bass player for The City Drive in 2007. Immediately following the band's dismemberment, Jake, along with Norm Kerner, began the development of a private recording studio, Perfect Sound Studios, which began recording in November 2009, and is located in the salubrious Hollywood Hills.

Alongside Jake is Jason Donaghy, audio engineer who worked on Band of Horses' Grammy nominated album, Infinite Arms, while at Perfect Sound.
