= Jeff Braun =

American mixing engineer (born 1989)

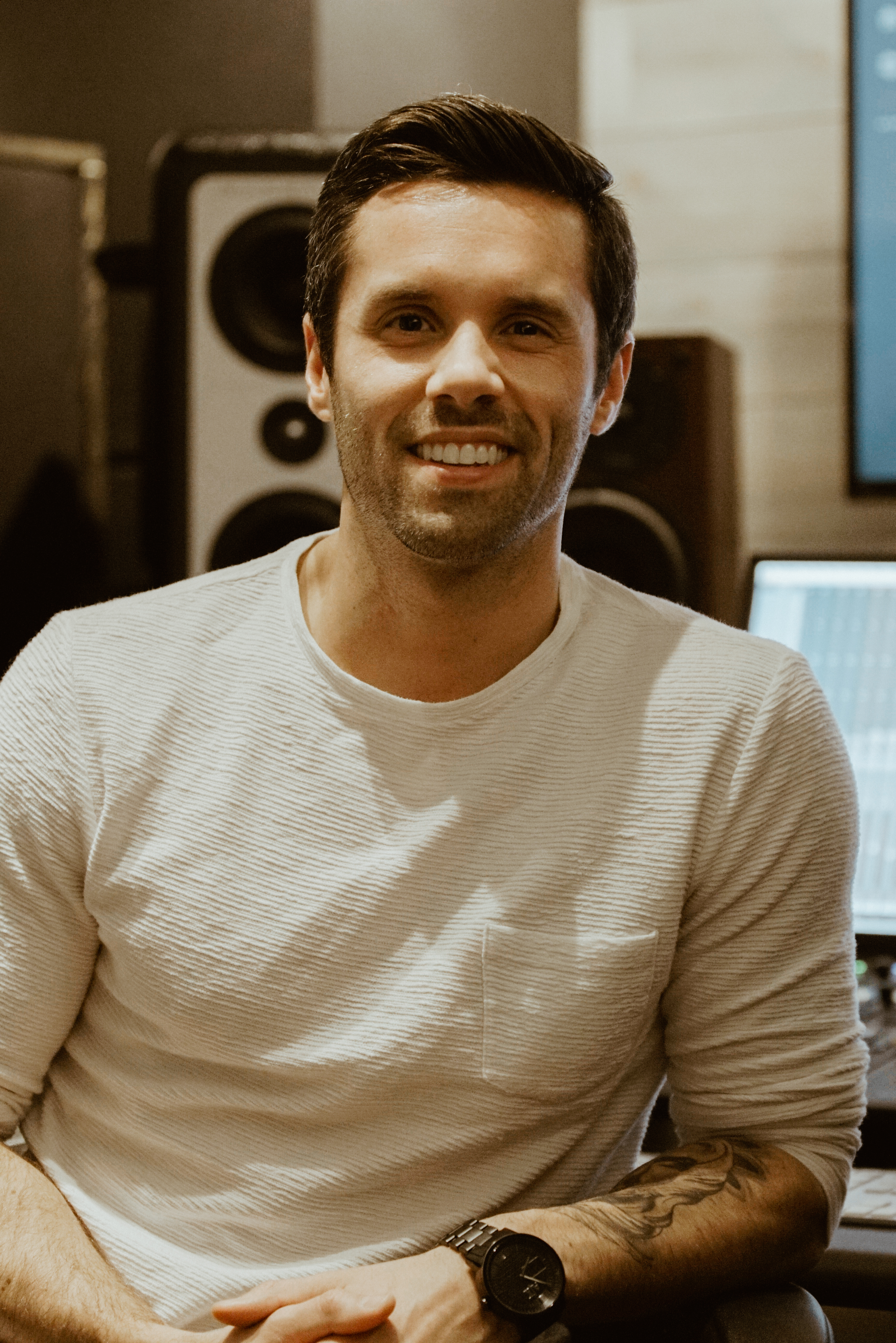
- Jeff Braun in his studio

Background information
- Born: August 9, 1989 (age 37)
- Origin: Minneapolis, Minnesota
- Genres: Pop, Rock, Country, Alternative, Indie
- Occupations: Mix Engineer, Engineer
- Years active: 2012–Present
- Website: mixedbyjeffbraun.com

Jeff Braun (born August 9, 1989) is an American mixing engineer. He has mixed records for Jason Aldean, Kane Brown, Nelly, Mitchell Tenpenny, Jelly Roll, Cole Swindell, Russell Dickerson, Elle King, Chris Young, The Band CAMINO, Ingrid Andress, Adam Doleac, Ben Rector, Seaforth, Lindsay Ell, Hunter Hayes, Granger Smith, LoCash, Sam Tinnesz and more. Braun has mixed eighteen #1 songs, over a dozen #1's on SiriusXM's The Highway, and a CMA Award for "Single of the Year" with Jason Aldean's "If I Didn't Love You" featuring Carrie Underwood. He currently resides in Nashville, Tennessee.

== Early years and personal life ==
Braun was born in Minneapolis, Minnesota. He was drawn to music at an early age, picking up the drums at 12 years old. While in school at Lakeville North High School, Braun was the captain of the drumline. He also joined a band where he performed in acts sharing the stage with bands such as Cartel, Gym Class Heroes and Quietdrive; as well as playing on the Vans Warped Tour. At age 18, Braun started recording and mixing local bands.

After high school, Braun attended Middle Tennessee State University where he graduated with a Bachelor of Science in Audio Production. His studio was involved in the AES recording competition in the "Traditional Studio" category. He also represented MTSU in Shure's 8th annual Fantastic Scholastic recording competition in which he won for the university over $11,000 in microphones.

After graduation, he co-founded Forty-One Fifteen, a multi room studio facility located in East Nashville, Tennessee. After a few years of tracking he transitioned into mixing full time. Braun currently works out of his private mix room, "Anthem House".

In May 2018, Jeff celebrated his first #1 song with Jason Aldean's song "You Make It Easy". He was also nominated for his first CMA Award for "Single of the Year", with Aldean's song "Drowns the Whiskey (featuring Miranda Lambert)". Shortly after, he was able to achieve another #1 with Mitchell Tenpenny's song "Drunk Me" followed by two more #1's with Aldean for his songs "Drowns the Whiskey (featuring Miranda Lambert)" and "Girl Like You". As of September 2023 Braun has mixed eighteen #1 songs on country radio and was recently nominated for CMA Single of the Year with Jelly Roll's "NEED A FAVOR."

Braun's mixes have also been used in movies and trailers such as The Emoji Movie, Pitch Perfect 3, The Walking Dead, Pretty Little Liars, Parenthood, Nashville, Shameless, and amongst many others.

== Mixing Discography ==
Songs mixed by Jeff Braun.
Mixing Discography
Year	Artist	Album	Song	Additional Info
2023	Jason Aldean	Single	Try That In A Small Town	• #1 US Hot Country Songs - Billboard • #1 Billboard Hot 100 • #1 US Country Airplay - Billboard
2023	Jason Aldean	Single	Let Your Boys Be Country	
2023	Jason Aldean	Single	Whiskey Drink	
2023	Jason Aldean	Single	Tough Crowd	
2023	Kane Brown (24kGoldn)	FAST X Soundtrack	My City	
2023	Mitchell Tenpenny	Single	Bigger Mistakes	
2023	Tyler Hubbard	Single	A Lot With a Little	
2023	Jelly Roll	Single	Need A Favor - Rock Mix	• #1 Hot Rock & Alternative - Billboard
2023	Chris Young	Single	Looking For You	• #13 US Country Airplay - Billboard • #37 Hot Country Songs - Billboard
2023	Russell Dickerson ft. Needtobreathe	Single	Red Dirt Church	
2023	The Band Camino	The Dark	Told You So	
2023	The Band Camino	The Dark	Last Man In The World	
2023	The Band Camino	The Dark	What Am I Missing?	
2023	Adam Doleac	Single	Wrong Side of a Sunrise	
2023	Alana Springsteen	Single	Ghost In My Guitar	
2023	Alana Springsteen	Single	Twenty Something	
2023	Alana Springsteen	Twenty Something: Messing It Up	You Don't Deserve A Country Song	
2023	Alana Springsteen	Twenty Something: Messing It Up	Goodbye Looks Good On You feat. Mitchell Tenpenny	ATMOS Mix
2023	Alana Springsteen	Twenty Something: Messing It Up	Tennessee Is Mine	
2023	Alana Springsteen	Twenty Something: Messing It Up	Should To Cry On	
2023	Mickey Guyton ft. Kane Brown	Single	Nothing Compares to You	
2023	Seaforth	Single	Been Better	
2023	Seaforth	Single	Loud Music	
2023	Breland	Single	Thirsty	
2023	Tyler Farr	Rednecks Like Me - EP	Tell You About That	
2023	Tyler Farr	Rednecks Like Me - EP	Questions	
2023	Tyler Farr	Rednecks Like Me - EP	Silverado Gold	
2023	Jenna Paulette	The Girl I Was	Truck Boy	
2023	Jenna Paulette	The Girl I Was	Anywhere The Wind Blows	
2023	Jenna Paulette	The Girl I Was	You Ain't No Cowboy	
2023	Jenna Paulette	The Girl I Was	Sun Keeps Coming Back Up	
2023	Jenna Paulette	The Girl I Was	Stop And Smell The Horses	
2023	Jenna Paulette	The Girl I Was	Fiddle And The Violin	
2023	Jenna Paulette	The Girl I Was	One Two Step Away	
2023	Jenna Paulette	The Girl I Was	We Know How To Friday Night	
2023	Jenna Paulette	The Girl I Was	Make The World A Small Town	
2023	Jenna Paulette	The Girl I Was	The Girl I Was	
2023	Jenna Paulette	The Girl I Was	Home On The Range (Intro / Outro)	
2023	Dylan Scott	Single	I'll Be a Bartender	
2023	Levi Hummon, Walker Hayes	Single	Paying For It	
2023	Kimberly Perry	Single	Hallelujah	
2023	David J	Single	Traffic On a Backroad	
2023	Erin Kinsey	Bet My Heart	Stayed A Summer	
2023	Erin Kinsey	Bet My Heart	Little More Cowboy	
2023	Erin Kinsey	Bet My Heart	Bet My Heart	
2023	Alee	Single	Stop Making Trucks	
2023	John Morgan	Remember Us - EP	Won't Be As Good	
2023	John Morgan	Remember Us - EP	Remember Us	
2023	John Morgan	Remember Us - EP	Friends Like That	
2023	John Morgan	Remember Us - EP	Cold Summer in San Antone	
2023	John Morgan	Remember Us - EP	It Ain't the Leavin'	
2023	John Morgan	Remember Us - EP	Ain't Been There Yet	
2023	Renee Blair	Single	Hillbillies & Betties	
2023	Tigerlilly	Single	Falalala Falling	
2023	Bryce Leatherwood	Single	The Finger	
2023	Austin Williams	Single	Stuck On Me	
2023	MaRynn Taylor	Single	Make You Mine	
2023	Jordana Bryant	Jordana Bryant - EP	Penniless & Broke	
2023	Riley Thomas	Single	I'll be Damned	
2022	Jelly Roll	Whitsitt Chapel	Need a Favor	• #1 US Country Airplay - Billboard • #1 US Hot Rock & Alternative Songs - Billboard • #1 Canada Country - Billboard • #1 The Highway - SiriusXM • #3 Hot Country Songs - Billboard • #3 US Rock Airplay - Billboard
2022	Russell Dickerson	Russell Dickerson	Blame it on Being Young	
2022	Russell Dickerson	Russell Dickerson	She Likes It	• #1 The Highway - SiriusXM • #13 Hot Country Songs - Billboard • #16 US Country Airplay - Billboard • RIAA Certified Platinum • ATMOS Mix
2022	Russell Dickerson	Russell Dickerson	18	
2022	Russell Dickerson	Russell Dickerson	Over and Over	
2022	Russell Dickerson	Russell Dickerson	She's Why	
2022	Restless Road	Single	Sundown Somewhere	
2022	Restless Road	Single	I Don't Want To Be That Guy	
2022	Restless Road	Single	Growing Old With You	• #1 The Highway - SiriusXM
2022	Nightly	I Wish You Loved Me	I Wish You Loved Me	
2022	Lauren Weintraub	This is Your Brain on Love	Boston	
2022	Lauren Weintraub	This is Your Brain on Love	Ex Appeal	
2022	Lauren Weintraub	This is Your Brain on Love	Over Here Over Here	
2022	Lauren Weintraub	This is Your Brain on Love	Before We Knew Too Much	
2022	Betty Who	BIG!	Big	Co-Mixed
2022	Betty Who	BIG!	Weekend	
2022	Betty Who	BIG!	Hey, It's Betty	
2022	Betty Who	BIG!	Blow Out The Candle	
2022	Betty Who	BIG!	I Can Be Your Man	
2022	Betty Who	BIG!	She Can Dance	
2022	Betty Who	BIG!	Someone Else	
2022	Betty Who	BIG!	The Hard Way	
2022	Betty Who	BIG!	One Of Us	Co-Mixed
2022	Betty Who	BIG!	Amelia's Voicemail	
2022	Betty Who	BIG!	Grown Ups Grow Apart	
2022	Jason Aldean	Christmas in Dixie	Christmas in Dixie	
2022	Jason Aldean	Georgia	Whiskey Me Away	
2022	Jason Aldean	Georgia	Trouble With A Heartbreak	• #1 Three Weeks US Country Airplay - Billboard • #1 Country Digital Song Sales - Billboard • #4 Hot Country Songs - Billboard • #2 Canada Country - Billboard
2022	Jason Aldean	Georgia	The State I'm In	
2022	Jason Aldean	Georgia	Midnight And Missin' You	
2022	Jason Aldean	Georgia	Ain't Enough Cowboy	
2022	Jason Aldean	Georgia	God Made Airplanes	
2022	Jason Aldean	Georgia	My Weakness	
2022	Jason Aldean	Georgia	Holy Water	
2022	Jason Aldean	Georgia	Rock And Roll Cowboy	
2022	Jason Aldean	Georgia	Your Mama	
2022	Adam Doleac	Barstool Whiskey Wonderland	Don't It Sound Alright	
2022	Adam Doleac	Barstool Whiskey Wonderland	Where Country Music Comes From	
2022	Adam Doleac	Barstool Whiskey Wonderland	Barstool Whiskey Wonderland	
2022	Adam Doleac	Barstool Whiskey Wonderland	Drinkin' It Wrong	
2022	Adam Doleac	Barstool Whiskey Wonderland	Fake Love	
2022	Adam Doleac	Barstool Whiskey Wonderland	Way Over You	
2022	Adam Doleac	Barstool Whiskey Wonderland	What Kinda Night	
2022	Adam Doleac	Barstool Whiskey Wonderland	Famous	
2022	Adam Doleac	Barstool Whiskey Wonderland	Somewhere Cool With You	
2022	Mitchell Tenpenny	This Is The Heavy	This Is The Heavy	
2022	Mitchell Tenpenny	This Is The Heavy	Good Place	
2022	Mitchell Tenpenny	This Is The Heavy	Always Something With You	
2022	Mitchell Tenpenny	This Is The Heavy	We Got History	• #1 The Highway - SiriusXM • #28 US Country Airplay - Billboard • #37 US Hot Country Songs - Billboard
2022	Mitchell Tenpenny	This Is The Heavy	Truth About You	• #1 US Country Airplay - Billboard • #1 Canada Country - Billboard • #1 The Highway - SiriusXM • #33 US Hot Country Songs - Billboard
2022	Mitchell Tenpenny	This Is The Heavy	Sleeping Alone	
2022	Mitchell Tenpenny	This Is The Heavy	More Than Whiskey Does	
2022	Mitchell Tenpenny	This Is The Heavy	Obsession	
2022	Mitchell Tenpenny	This Is The Heavy	Good and Gone	
2022	Mitchell Tenpenny	This Is The Heavy	Do You	
2022	Mitchell Tenpenny	This Is The Heavy	Bucket List	• #1 The Highway - SiriusXM
2022	Mitchell Tenpenny	This Is The Heavy	Cry Baby	
2022	Mitchell Tenpenny	This Is The Heavy	Miss You Cause I'm Drinking	
2022	Mitchell Tenpenny	This Is The Heavy	Elephant In The Room (feat. Teddy Swims)	
2022	Mitchell Tenpenny	This Is The Heavy	Happy and I Hate It	
2022	Mitchell Tenpenny	This Is The Heavy	Now We're Talking	
2022	Mitchell Tenpenny	This Is The Heavy	Losers	
2022	Mitchell Tenpenny	This Is The Heavy	Still Thinking 'Bout You	
2022	Mitchell Tenpenny	This Is The Heavy	Long As You Let Me	
2022	Mitchell Tenpenny	This Is The Heavy	That's How She Goes	
2022	Mitchell Tenpenny	The Low Light Sessions	Horseshoes And Hand Grenades	
2022	Mitchell Tenpenny	The Low Light Sessions	Dear Jesus	
2022	Mitchell Tenpenny	The Low Light Sessions	Mama Raised The Hell Out Of Me	
2022	Mitchell Tenpenny	The Low Light Sessions	My Next Sad Song	
2022	Mitchell Tenpenny	The Low Light Sessions	I Know Something She Don't Know	
2022	Mitchell Tenpenny	The Low Light Sessions	I Can't Get Another You	
2022	Mitchell Tenpenny	The Low Light Sessions	Don't Make Me Choose	
2022	Mitchell Tenpenny	The Low Light Sessions	The Way You Are	
2022	Ben Rector	What Makes A Man - Single	What Makes A Man (feat. Thomas Rhett)	
2022	Lindsay Ell	Right On Time - Single	Right On Time	• #8 Canada Country - Billboard • CCMA Single of the Year
2022	Cole Swindell	Stereotype	Down To The Bar (feat. HARDY)	
2022	Cole Swindell	Stereotype	Stereotype	• #1 The Highway - SiriusXM
2022	Cole Swindell	Stereotype	Every Beer	
2022	Alana Springsteen	History Of Breaking Up (Part Two)	While You're At It	
2022	Alana Springsteen	History Of Breaking Up (Part Two)	That Was All You	
2022	Jenna Paulette	Slow Drawl - Single	Slow Drawl	
2022	Bear Bailey	Put Your Heart On My Tab - Single	Put Your Heart On My Tab	
2022	Ben Gallaher	Country In The House - Single	Country In The House	
2022	Priscilla Block	Off The Deep End - Single	Off The Deep End	
2022	Seth Ennis	Hair Ties (I Don't Wanna) - Single	Hair Ties (I Don't Wanna)	
2022	Dylan Schneider	Single	Ain't Missin' You	
2022	Dylan Schneider	College Town - EP	College Town	
2022	Dylan Schneider	College Town - EP	Lost In A Small Town	
2022	Dylan Schneider	College Town - EP	21 And Over	
2022	Renee Blair	Spf Me - Single	Spf Me	
2022	Nightly	Hate My Favorite Band - Single	Hate My Favorite Band	
2022	Nightly	On Your Sleeve - Single	On Your Sleeve	
2021	Elle King	Drunk (And I Don't Wanna Go Home) - Single	Drunk (And I Don't Wanna Go Home) (feat. Miranda Lambert)	• #1 US Country Airplay - Billboard • #1 The Highway - SiriusXM • #1 Three Weeks Country Digital Song Sales - Billboard • #4 Hot Rock & Alternative Songs - Billboard • #6 Hot Country Songs - Billboard • #12 Adult Top 40 - Billboard • #11 Australia Country Hot 50 (TMN) • RIAA Certified Platinum
2021	Mitchell Tenpenny	Midtown Diaries	To Us It Did	• #1 The Highway - SiriusXM
2021	Mitchell Tenpenny	Midtown Diaries	Good Thing	
2021	Mitchell Tenpenny	Midtown Diaries	I Can't Love You Any More	
2021	Mitchell Tenpenny	Midtown Diaries	Bucket List	• #1 The Highway - SiriusXM
2021	Mitchell Tenpenny	Midtown Diaries	Truth About You	• #1 US Country Airplay - Billboard • #1 Canada Country - Billboard • #1 The Highway - SiriusXM • #33 US Hot Country Songs - Billboard
2021	Mitchell Tenpenny	Midtown Diaries	A Girl's Love	
2021	Mitchell Tenpenny	Midtown Diaries	Don't Let Me Let You	
2021	Mitchell Tenpenny	Midtown Diaries	She Hates Me Too	
2021	Mitchell Tenpenny	Naughty List	Neon Christmas	
2021	Mitchell Tenpenny	Naughty List	Snow Angels	
2021	Mitchell Tenpenny	Naughty List	Have Yourself A Merry Little Christmas	
2021	Mitchell Tenpenny	Naughty List	Naughty List	
2021	Mitchell Tenpenny	Naughty List	Let It Snow! Let It Snow! Let It Snow!	
2021	Mitchell Tenpenny	Naughty List	Don't Hang The Mistletoe	
2021	Mitchell Tenpenny	Naughty List	Joy To The World	
2021	Mitchell Tenpenny	Naughty List	Jingle Bell Rock	
2021	Mitchell Tenpenny	Naughty List	Santa Claus Is Comin' To Town	
2021	Mitchell Tenpenny	Naughty List	I Hope It Snows	
2021	Mitchell Tenpenny	Naughty List	O Holy Night	
2021	Jason Aldean	Macon	After You	
2021	Jason Aldean	Macon	Over You Again	
2021	Jason Aldean	Macon	That's What Tequila Does	• #5 US Country Airplay - Billboard • #8 US Bubbling Under Hot 100 Singles - Billboard • #30 US Hot Country Songs - Billboard
2021	Jason Aldean	Macon	Small Town Small	
2021	Jason Aldean	Macon	If I Didn't Love You	• #1 Three Weeks US Country Airplay - Billboard • #1 Country Digital Song Sales - Billboard • #2 US Hot Country Songs - Billboard • #1 Canada Country - Billboard • #4 Australia Country Hot 50 (TMN) • #15 Hot 100 - Billboard • RIAA Certified Platinum
2021	Jason Aldean	Macon	Story For Another Glass	
2021	Jason Aldean	Macon	Heaven	
2021	Jason Aldean	Macon	This Bar Don't Work Anymore	
2021	Jason Aldean	Macon	The Sad Songs	
2021	Jason Aldean	Macon	Watching You Love Me	
2021	Kane Brown	Memory - Single	Memory (feat. Blackbear)	• #9 US Hot Country Songs - Billboard • #17 Mainstream Top 40 - Billboard • #12 New Zealand Hot Singles (RMNZ) • Vocal Production / Engineered
2021	Kane Brown	Blessed and Free - Single	Blessed and Free (feat. H.E.R.)	Vocal Engineer
2021	Chris Young	Famous Friends	At The End Of A Bar (feat. Mitchell Tenpenny)	• #1 US Country Airplay - Billboard • #1 Canada Country - Billboard • #1 The Highway - SiriusXM
2021	Chris Young	Famous Friends	Love Looks Good On You	
2021	Chris Young	Famous Friends	One Of Them Nights	
2021	Nelly	Heartland	Lil Bit (feat. Florida Georgia Line)	• #1 Three Weeks Country Digital Song Sales - Billboard • #1 Country Streaming - Billboard • #3 US Hot Country Songs - Billboard • #23 US Hot 100 - Billboard • #16 US Top 40 - Billboard • #20 Adult Top 40 - Billboard • #35 Canadian Hot 100 • RIAA Certified 3× Platinum • Music Canada Certified Platinum
2021	Nelly	Heartland	Ms. Drive Me Crazy (feat. Darius Rucker & City Spud)	
2021	Nelly	Heartland	Grits & Glamour (feat. Kane Brown)	Vocal Production / Engineered
2021	Lindsay Ell	It's Beginning To Look A Lot Like Christmas - Single	It's Beginning To Look A Lot Like Christmas	
2021	The Band CAMINO	The Band CAMINO	EVERYBODYDIES	
2021	The Band CAMINO	The Band CAMINO	Roses	
2021	The Band CAMINO	The Band CAMINO	Underneath My Skin	
2021	The Band CAMINO	The Band CAMINO	I Think I Like You	• #12 Hot AC Charts
2021	The Band CAMINO	The Band CAMINO	Who Do You Think You Are?	
2021	The Band CAMINO	The Band CAMINO	Sorry Mom	
2021	The Band CAMINO	The Band CAMINO	Just A Phase	
2021	The Band CAMINO	The Band CAMINO	Song About You	
2021	The Band CAMINO	The Band CAMINO	Damage	
2021	The Band CAMINO	The Band CAMINO	Look Up	
2021	The Band CAMINO	The Band CAMINO	Help Me Get Over You	
2021	The Band CAMINO	The Band CAMINO	Get It Your Way	
2021	Hastings	Hastings - EP	Blank Me	
2021	Hastings	Hastings - EP	Right Now	
2021	Hastings	Hastings - EP	Heart's Not In It	
2021	Restless Road	Took One Look At Her Momma - Single	Took One Look At Her Momma	
2021	Restless Road	Bar Friends - Single	Bar Friends	
2021	Restless Road	Hometown Tonight - Single	Hometown Tonight	
2021	Restless Road	Headlights - Single	Headlights	
2021	Nightly	Lose My Number - Single	Lose My Number	
2021	Seth Ennis	I Still Do - Single	I Still Do	
2021	Seth Ennis	U-Turn - Single	U-Turn	
2021	Seth Ennis	So Much / Just A Little - Single	So Much	
2021	Seth Ennis	So Much / Just A Little - Single	Just A Little	
2020	Kane Brown	Mix Tape Vol. 1 - EP	Be Like That (feat. Swae Lee & Khalid)	• #1 Two Weeks Canada CHR/Top 40 - Billboard • #5 Canada Hot AC - Billboard • #6 Canadian Hot 100 - Billboard • #8 US Mainstream Top 40 - Billboard • #11 US Adult Top 40 - Billboard Vocal Engineering
2020	Mitchell Tenpenny	Can't Go To Church - Single	Can't Go To Church	• #1 The Highway - SiriusXM
2020	Mitchell Tenpenny	Broken Up - Single	Broken Up	• #1 The Highway - SiriusXM
2020	Granger Smith	Country Things	Country Things	
2020	Granger Smith	Country Things	Holler (feat. Earl Dibbles Jr.)	
2020	Granger Smith	Country Things	Workaholic (feat. Earl Dibbles Jr.)	
2020	Lindsay Ell	Heart Theory	Hits Me	
2020	Lindsay Ell	Heart Theory	How Good	
2020	Lindsay Ell	Heart Theory	I Don't Love You	• #6 Canada Country - Billboard
2020	Lindsay Ell	Heart Theory	Want Me Back	• #1 Canada Country - Billboard • Music Canada Certified Gold
2020	Lindsay Ell	Heart Theory	Get Over You	
2020	Lindsay Ell	Heart Theory	Wrong Girl	
2020	Lindsay Ell	Heart Theory	Body Language Of A Breakup	
2020	Lindsay Ell	Heart Theory	Good On You	
2020	Lindsay Ell	Heart Theory	The Other Side	
2020	Lindsay Ell	Heart Theory	Go To	
2020	Lindsay Ell	Heart Theory	Make You	
2020	Lindsay Ell	Heart Theory	Ready To Love	
2020	Seaforth	Talk About - Single	Talk About	
2020	Seaforth	Close Enough - Single	Close Enough	
2020	Restless Road	Restless Road - EP	Take Me Home (feat. Kane Brown)	
2020	Restless Road	Restless Road - EP	One Step Ahead	
2020	Tyler Farr	Only Truck In Town - EP	Only Truck In Town	
2020	Rachel Wammack	What He Does - Single	What He Does	
2020	ADONA	Birds of Prey	Hit Me With Your Best Shot	
2020	The Band CAMINO	Crying Over You - Single	Crying Over You (feat. Chelsea Cutler)	
2020	The Wolfe Brothers	Kids On Cassette	No Brakes	• #1 Australia Country Radio
2020	Tim Hicks	Wreck	No Truck Song	• #1 Canada Country - Billboard • Music Canada Certified Gold
2020	Gone West	Canyons	R & R	
2020	Jordan Rager	Somebody's Summer - Single	Somebody's Summer	
2019	Jason Aldean	9 (RIAA Certified Gold)	Tattoos and Tequilla	
2019	Jason Aldean	9 (RIAA Certified Gold)	Blame It On You	• #1 US Country Airplay - Billboard • #1 Two Weeks Canada Country - Billboard • #5 US Hot Country Songs - Billboard
2019	Jason Aldean	9 (RIAA Certified Gold)	Champagne Town	
2019	Jason Aldean	9 (RIAA Certified Gold)	Some Things You Don't Forget	
2019	Jason Aldean	9 (RIAA Certified Gold)	Got What I Got	• #1 US Country Airplay - Billboard • #1 Canada Country - Billboard • Five Weeks #1 Country Streaming - Billboard • #2 US Hot Country Songs - Billboard • RIAA Certified 2× Platinum
2019	Jason Aldean	9 (RIAA Certified Gold)	Keeping It Small Town	
2019	Jason Aldean	9 (RIAA Certified Gold)	Camouflage Hat	
2019	Jason Aldean	9 (RIAA Certified Gold)	Came Here To Drink	
2019	Jason Aldean	9 (RIAA Certified Gold)	We Back	• #1 Canada Country - Billboard • #6 US Country Airplay - Billboard • #8 US Hot Country Songs - Billboard
2019	Jason Aldean	9 (RIAA Certified Gold)	Dirt We Were Raised On	
2019	Jason Aldean	9 (RIAA Certified Gold)	I Don't Drink Anymore	
2019	Jason Aldean	9 (RIAA Certified Gold)	Cowboy Killer	
2019	Jason Aldean	9 (RIAA Certified Gold)	One For The Road	
2019	Jason Aldean	9 (RIAA Certified Gold)	Talk About Georgia	
2019	Jason Aldean	9 (RIAA Certified Gold)	The Same Way	
2019	Jason Aldean	9 (RIAA Certified Gold)	She Likes It	
2019	Kane Brown	Like A Rodeo - Single	Like A Rodeo	• RIAA Certified Gold
2019	Kane Brown	Good As You (Stripped) - Single	Good As You (Stripped)	
2019	Mitchell Tenpenny	Drunk Me (Acoustic) - Single	Drunk Me (Acoustic)	
2019	Mitchell Tenpenny	Just To See You Smile - Single	Just To See You Smile	
2019	Mitchell Tenpenny	Alcohol You Later (Acoustic) - Single	Alcohol You Later (Acoustic)	• RIAA Certified Gold
2019	Mitchell Tenpenny	Anything She Says - Single	Anything She Says (feat. Seaforth)	• #1 The Highway - SiriusXM • RIAA Certified Gold
2019	Granger Smith	Holler - Single	Holler	
2019	Granger Smith	Heaven Bound Balloons - Single	Heaven Bound Balloons	
2019	LoCash	Brothers	Feels Like A Party	• #26 US Country Airplay - Billboard
2019	LoCash	Brothers	God Thing	
2019	The Band CAMINO	Tryhard	What I Want	
2019	The Band CAMINO	Tryhard	Hush Hush	
2019	The Band CAMINO	Tryhard	Honest	
2019	The Band CAMINO	Tryhard	See Through	
2019	The Band CAMINO	Tryhard	Haunted	
2019	The Band CAMINO	Tryhard	Farsighted	
2019	The Band CAMINO	Tryhard	Break Me	
2019	The Band CAMINO	Something To Hold On To - Single	Something To Hold On To	
2019	Ingrid Andress	Lady Like	Both	
2019	Adam Doleac	Famous - Single	Famous	• #1 The Highway - SiriusXM • RIAA Certified Gold
2019	Jordan Rager	Color Blind - Single	Color Blind	
2019	Jordan Rager	The Wrong Ones - Single	The Wrong Ones	
2019	Jon Mero	Fun - Single	Fun	
2019	Chase Martin	Love Without You - Single	Love Without You	
2019	Renee Blair	Wearin' It Well - Single	Wearin' It Well	
2019	Renee Blair	Summadat - Single	Summadat	
2019	Renee Blair	Better Off - Single	Better Off	
2019	Baylee Littrell	770 Country	Boxes	
2019	Baylee Littrell	770 Country	Grow Up	
2018	Jason Aldean	Rearview Town• #1 Billboard 200 • #1 Top Country Albums - Billboard	Dirt to Dust	
2018	Jason Aldean	Rearview Town• #1 Billboard 200 • #1 Top Country Albums - Billboard	Set It Off	
2018	Jason Aldean	Rearview Town• #1 Billboard 200 • #1 Top Country Albums - Billboard	Girl Like You	• Two Weeks #1 US Country Airplay - Billboard • #1 Canada Country - Billboard • #5 US Hot Country Songs - Billboard • RIAA Certified Platinum
2018	Jason Aldean	Rearview Town• #1 Billboard 200 • #1 Top Country Albums - Billboard	You Make It Easy	• Two Weeks #1 US Country Airplay - Billboard • Five Weeks #1 Country Digital Streaming - Billboard • #1 US Hot Country Songs - Billboard • Two Weeks #1 Canada Country - Billboard • RIAA Certified 6× Platinum • Music Canada Certified 3× Platinum
2018	Jason Aldean	Rearview Town• #1 Billboard 200 • #1 Top Country Albums - Billboard	Gettin' Warmed Up	
2018	Jason Aldean	Rearview Town• #1 Billboard 200 • #1 Top Country Albums - Billboard	Blacktop Gone	
2018	Jason Aldean	Rearview Town• #1 Billboard 200 • #1 Top Country Albums - Billboard	Drowns the Whiskey (feat. Miranda Lambert)	• Two Weeks #1 US Country Airplay - Billboard • #1 Two Weeks Canada Country - Billboard • #3 US Hot Country Songs - Billboard • RIAA Certified Platinum
2018	Jason Aldean	Rearview Town• #1 Billboard 200 • #1 Top Country Albums - Billboard	Rearview Town	• #1 US Country Airplay - Billboard • #1 Canada Country - Billboard • #4 US Hot Country Songs - Billboard • RIAA Certified Platinum
2018	Jason Aldean	Rearview Town• #1 Billboard 200 • #1 Top Country Albums - Billboard	Love Me or Don't	
2018	Jason Aldean	Rearview Town• #1 Billboard 200 • #1 Top Country Albums - Billboard	Like You Were Mine	
2018	Jason Aldean	Rearview Town• #1 Billboard 200 • #1 Top Country Albums - Billboard	Better at Being Who I Am	
2018	Jason Aldean	Rearview Town• #1 Billboard 200 • #1 Top Country Albums - Billboard	I'll Wait for You	
2018	Jason Aldean	Rearview Town• #1 Billboard 200 • #1 Top Country Albums - Billboard	Ride All Night	
2018	Jason Aldean	Rearview Town• #1 Billboard 200 • #1 Top Country Albums - Billboard	Up in Smoke	
2018	Jason Aldean	Rearview Town• #1 Billboard 200 • #1 Top Country Albums - Billboard	High Noon Neon	
2018	Mitchell Tenpenny	Telling All My Secrets	Truck I Drove In High School	
2018	Mitchell Tenpenny	Telling All My Secrets	All On You	
2018	Mitchell Tenpenny	Telling All My Secrets	Goner	
2018	Mitchell Tenpenny	Telling All My Secrets	Chance Worth Taking	
2018	Mitchell Tenpenny	Telling All My Secrets	I Get The Picture	
2018	Mitchell Tenpenny	Telling All My Secrets	Drunk Me	• #1 US Country Airplay - Billboard • #6 US Hot Country Songs - Billboard • RIAA Certified 2× Platinum • Music Canada Certified Gold
2018	Mitchell Tenpenny	Telling All My Secrets	Somebody's Got Me	
2018	Mitchell Tenpenny	Telling All My Secrets	Somebody Ain't You	
2018	Mitchell Tenpenny	Telling All My Secrets	Telling All My Secrets	
2018	Mitchell Tenpenny	Telling All My Secrets	Walk Like Him	
2018	Mitchell Tenpenny	Have Yourself a Merry Little Christmas - Single	Have Yourself a Merry Little Christmas	
2018	Hunter Hayes	This Girl - Single	This Girl	
2018	Josh Gracin	Good For You - Single	Good For You	
2018	Tim Hicks	New Tattoo	New Tattoo	
2018	Tim Hicks	New Tattoo	1975	
2018	Tim Hicks	New Tattoo	If The Beat's Alright	
2018	Tim Hicks	New Tattoo	What A Song Should Do	• #1 Canada Country - Billboard • Music Canada Certified Gold
2018	Tim Hicks	New Tattoo	Loud	• Top 5 on Canada Country - Billboard • Music Canada Certified Gold
2018	Tim Hicks	New Tattoo	Gettin' To Me	
2018	Tim Hicks	New Tattoo	The Worst Kind	
2018	Tim Hicks	New Tattoo	Throw A Ball	
2018	Tim Hicks	New Tattoo	Best I Can	
2018	Jon Mero	Hey Marjorie - Single	Hey Marjorie	
2018	Sam Tinnesz	Hold Me Up - Single	Hold Me Up	
2018	The Band CAMINO	Fool Of Myself - Single	Fool Of Myself	
2018	The Band CAMINO	Know Me - Single	Know Me	
2018	The Band CAMINO	Less Than I Do - Single	Less Than I Do	
2018	Kane Brown	What Ifs (Remix) - Single	What Ifs (Remix)	
2018	Kane Brown	Heaven (Acoustic) - Single	Heaven (Acoustic)	
2018	Amy Stroup	Far Side Of The Sea - Single	Far Side Of The Sea	
2018	Amy Stroup	Lost Ones - Single	Lost Ones	
2018	Renee Blair	Gotta Quit Drinking - Single	Gotta Quit Drinking	
2018	Renee Blair	Me Tonight - Single	Me Tonight	
2018	Rajiv Dhall	Empty Whiskey Glass - Single	Empty Whiskey Glass	
2018	Rajiv Dhall	Happier - Single	Happier	
2017	Dylan Schneider	Single	How Does It Sound	• RIAA Certified Gold
2017	Wave And Rome	Be My Girl - Single	Be My Girl	
2017	Nick Fradiani	Where We Left Off	We Live Forever	
2016	Dylan Schneider	17 - EP	Love The Girls	
2016	Dylan Schneider	17 - EP	How Bad Could One Kiss Hurt	
2016	Dylan Schneider	17 - EP	Gimme A Red Light	
2016	Dylan Schneider	17 - EP	Want You Back	
2016	Dylan Schneider	17 - EP	We've Been Here Before	
2016	Dylan Schneider	Wannabe - EP	You Heard Wrong	
2016	Dylan Schneider	Wannabe - EP	Two Black X's	
2016	Dylan Schneider	Wannabe - EP	50 Cent Lighter	
2016	Ruelle	Game of Survival - Single	Game of Survival	
2016	Ruelle	Madness - Single	Madness	
2016	Nick Fradiani	Hurricane	Forget2ForgetU	

== RIAA Certifications ==
Recording Industry Association of America's certified sales related to music mixed by Jeff Braun.
Certified Sales	Song	Artist	Certification Date
6× Platinum	"You Make It Easy"	Jason Aldean	Sep 1, 2022
3× Platinum	"Lil Bit" feat. Florida Georgia Line	Nelly	Sep 23, 2022
3× Platinum	"Be Like That" feat. Swae Lee and Khalid	Kane Brown	Oct 27, 2022
2× Platinum	"Got What I Got"	Jason Aldean	Sep 1, 2022
2× Platinum	"Drunk Me"	Mitchell Tenpenny	Oct 10, 2019
Platinum	"If I Didn't Love You"	Jason Aldean	Sep 1, 2022
Platinum	"Rearview Town"	Jason Aldean	Dec 9, 2020
Platinum	"Rearview Town" Album	Jason Aldean	Dec 9, 2020
Platinum	"Drowns The Whiskey" feat. Miranda Lambert	Jason Aldean	Aug 8, 2019
Platinum	"Girl Like You"	Jason Aldean	Dec 9, 2020
Platinum	"Drunk (And I Don't Wanna Go Home)" feat. Miranda Lambert	Elle King	Mar 1, 2022
Platinum	"Memory" feat. Blackbear	Kane Brown	May 9, 2022
Gold	"Like A Rodeo"	Kane Brown	Feb 24, 2021
Gold	"Anything She Says" feat. Seaforth	Mitchell Tenpenny	Oct 20, 2020
Gold	"Alcohol You Later"	Mitchell Tenpenny	Jun 5, 2020
Gold	"9" Album	Jason Aldean	Sep 1, 2022
Gold	"Famous"	Adam Doleac	May 20, 2021
