= Sunday at Foxwoods =

Studio album by Boys Like Girls
- Released: October 20, 2023
- Studio: The Lodge (Park City); The Farm (Nashville); Blackbird (Nashville)
- Genre: Pop rock
- Length: 42:28
- Label: Fearless
- Producer: Martin Johnson; Brandon Paddock; Danon Rector

Boys Like Girls chronology
Crazy World (2012)	Sunday at Foxwoods (2023)

Singles from Sunday at Foxwoods
- 1. "Blood and Sugar" Released: May 19, 2023; 2. "Language" Released: June 23, 2023; 3. "The Outside" Released: July 28, 2023; 4. "Cry" Released: August 25, 2023; 5. "New Love" Released: September 22, 2023

Sunday at Foxwoods is the fourth studio album by American band Boys Like Girls. The album was released on October 20, 2023, by record label Fearless Records, being their album debut under this label. It is their first studio album since Crazy World, released nearly 11 years prior in December 2012, marking their longest gap in between studio albums.

== Background ==
Shortly before the COVID-19 pandemic, Martin Johnson was asked by bandmate John Keefe and former bandmate Paul DiGiovanni if he wanted to make another album. Johnson agreed and they began writing songs, which he questioned "Who's it for?." He recalled, "It's easy to forget that there are people willing to sing your songs back to you." During the making of Sunday at Foxwoods, DiGiovanni and bassist Morgan Dorr left the group and were replaced by Jamel Hawke and Gregory James. The group performed at the 2022 When We Were Young festival, where they felt motivated to record another album. It was recorded in Johnson's studio in Nashville, Tennessee. The concept of the album deals with nostalgia, while committing to reinvention. The title of the album came from the Foxwoods Resort Casino in Ledyard, Connecticut.

== Composition ==
Sunday at Foxwoods was produced by Martin Johnson, Brandon Paddock and Danon Rector. The album sees the group returning to their pop rock roots and departing from their country-tinged sound heard on their third studio album, Crazy World (2012). Lyrically, the album is a tribute to the people who has made the band's journey possible. The opening song "Monday Morning" is a faced-paced track. The song "Blood and Sugar" is described as an 80s' glam rock track. An early demo of the track was recorded in 2020, which Keefe approved of and was released as the album's lead single. The seventh track, "Cry" is a ballad song, which was written nine years prior and was recorded in six takes. The album also features the pop-punk leaning "The Outside, which was written in 2015, and singalong "Brooklyn State of Mind". The album's fifth track, "New Love" came about after Johnson heard a track being played by Ryland Blackinton, formerly of Cobra Starship. He sang a chorus along with the track and ended up recording it and started piecing lyrics together.

== Release ==
On May 19, 2023, the group released the album's lead single, "Blood and Sugar". The album's second single, "Language" was released on June 23. The band released "The Outside" on July 28, as the album's third single, along with premiering a music video for the song. "Cry" was released as the album's fourth single on August 25. The fifth and final single, "New Love" was released on September 22. In support of the album, the group embarked on the Speaking Our Language Tour from September to November 2023, with support from State Champs on all dates, as well as Four Year Strong, 3OH!3, LØLØ, the Summer Set, the Ready Set, and Max Bemis on select dates. On October 6, the group released a collaborative version of "The Outside", featuring 3OH!3, State Champs, the Summer Set and the Ready Set.

== Critical reception ==
Professional ratings
Review scores
Source	Rating
AllMusic	4/5 stars
Chorus.fm	Positive
New Noise Magazine	5/5 stars

Sunday at Foxwoods was met with positive reviews from music critics. Matt Collar of AllMusic stated, "All of these songs are also expertly rendered, mixing pounding club beats right next to searing rock-guitar riffs and sharp slices of day-glo keyboards. With Sunday at Foxwoods, Boys Like Girls have made an album of rise-to-the-occasion anthems that play like the soundtrack to their own coming-of-age movie." Adam Grundy of Chorus.fm remarked, "While some fans may not like the brooding, mid-tempo, 80's feel of the sound they went for on this record, it just feels like the album they were destined to make given all the creative outlets and band member changes that went on. The remarkable thing about Boys Like Girls is that they took their hiatus to heart, grew and learned from it, and ultimately came back stronger than ever on Sunday At Foxwoods." Kanan Nagel of New Noise Magazine noted how the band "developed a distinctive sound" and praised the group's maturity on the album. The Soundboard Reviews stated, "Many of the songs on this record are sugar rushes that will sate lovers of all things pop, but anyone diving any further beneath the surface will spot missed opportunities often, even though the new '80s direction the band have opted to take is really very well done and absolutely a good move for them."

== Track listing ==
Sunday at Foxwoods track listing
No.	Title	Writer(s)	Length
1.	"Sunday at Foxwoods"	Martin Johnson; Brandon Paddock	1:57
2.	"The Outside"	Johnson; Sean Foreman	4:04
3.	"Language"	Johnson; Peter Thomas; Jake Torrey	2:59
4.	"Blood and Sugar"	Johnson; Paddock; Spencer Stewart	3:06
5.	"New Love"	Johnson; Ryland Blackinton	3:43
6.	"Miracle"	Johnson; Azul; Eren Cannata; Tia Scola; Johnny Simpson	3:01
7.	"Cry"	Johnson; Dan Layus	3:39
8.	"Monday Morning"	Johnson; Danen Rector	1:34
9.	"Physical"	Johnson; Benjamin Berger; Ryan McMahon; Ryan Rabin	3:31
10.	"Hourglass"	Johnson; David Hodges	3:44
11.	"Story of a Lifetime"	Johnson; Sam Hollander; Paddock	3:29
12.	"Brooklyn State of Mind"	Johnson; Blackinton	3:04
13.	"Lost in Wonderland"	Johnson; Hollander	4:37
Total length:			42:28

== Personnel ==
Credits adapted from the album's liner notes.

=== Boys Like Girls ===
- Martin Johnson – vocals, electric guitars, acoustic guitars, keyboards, piano, synthesizers, percussion, string arrangements, gang vocals, production, recording, mixing
- John Keefe – drums, gang vocals
- Gregory James – bass, backing vocals, gang vocals
- Jamel Hawke – guitar, gang vocals (all tracks); keyboards (track 9)

=== Additional contributors ===
- Brandon Paddock – production, recording, programming, keyboards, guitar, string arrangements, backing vocals, bass, gang vocals
- Danen Rector – production, programming, guitars, keyboards, percussion, backing vocals (all tracks); recording, mixing (2–13)
- Peter Thomas – production (3)
- Ryland Blackinton – additional production, recording (5)
- Rob Moose – recording, strings (7, 13)
- Oliver Kraus – recording, strings (7, 10)
- Chris Steffen – recording (2, 4, 5, 7, 9)
- Matt Huber – mixing
- Chris Gehringer – mastering (1, 2, 5–13)
- Brian Lucey – mastering (3, 4)
- Will Quinnell – mastering assistance (1, 2, 5–13)
- Ilya Toshinskiy – acoustic guitars (13)
- Naomi Cooke Johnson – gang vocals
- Rachel Braig – gang vocals (3)
- Max Challis – gang vocals (3)
- Riley Owens – gang vocals (3)
- Jake Torrey – gang vocals (3)
- Spencer Stewart – gang vocals (4)
- Jeffery Jordan – gang vocals (4)
- Abby Williams – gang vocals (9)
