= Craig Wiseman =

American songwriter

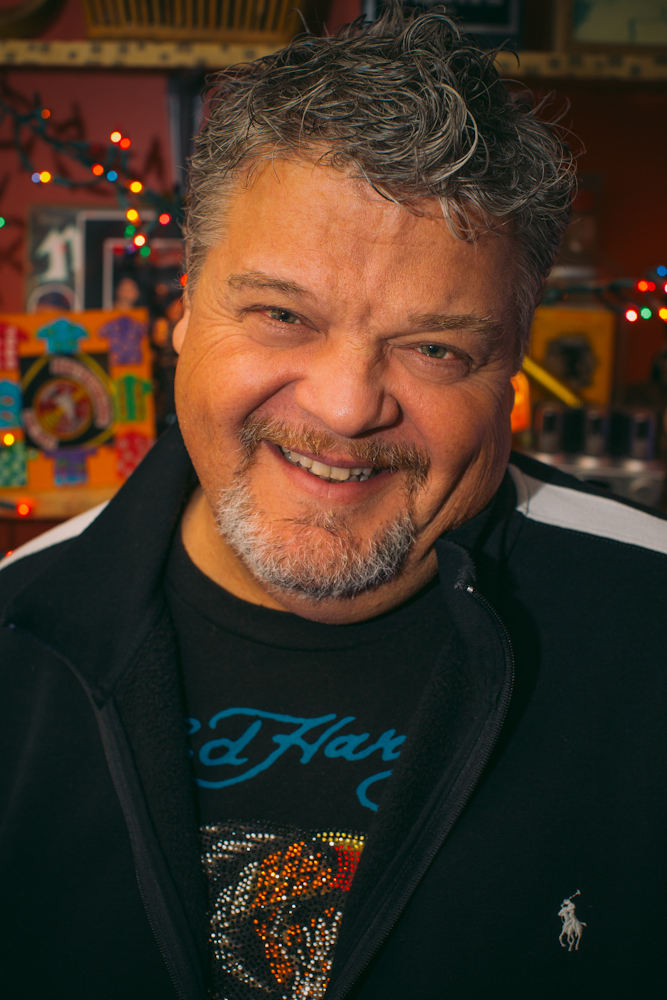
- Wiseman in 2014

Background information
- Born: Craig Michael Wiseman
- Origin: Hattiesburg, Mississippi, United States
- Genres: Country
- Occupation: Songwriter
- Years active: Late 1980s–present

Craig Michael Wiseman is an American country music songwriter and producer, and the owner/founder of the Big Loud enterprise. He has been writing since the late 1980s, and his songs have been recorded by Lorrie Morgan, Tim McGraw, Kenny Chesney, Dolly Parton, Blake Shelton, and numerous other acts. He has written twenty-six No. 1 songs on the Billboard Hot Country Songs music charts, and has won a number of industry awards. In 2009, he was named "Songwriter of the Decade" by the Nashville Songwriters Association International, and in 2015, he was inducted into the Nashville Songwriters Hall of Fame.

== Early life ==
Michael Wiseman was born and raised in Hattiesburg, Mississippi. He began playing music while still a child, and later began playing drums professionally. In 1985, he moved to Nashville to pursue a career in songwriting.

== Music career ==
=== Songwriting ===
At age 24, Craig had his first chart success with the track "The Only One" from Roy Orbison's Mystery Girl album. In 1990, Wiseman was signed to Almo/Irving Music, where he wrote a number of hits. In 1997, he was named "Writer of the Year" by both Music Row and the Nashville Songwriters Association International (NSAI).

Wiseman signed to a new publishing contract with BMG Music Publishing in 2000. During his three years at BMG, he wrote or co-wrote 22 singles, among them was "Shoulda Woulda Coulda" by British pop star Beverley Knight. In 2002, Billboard magazine named him a 2002 Top 2 Country Songwriter.

Since then, Wiseman's songwriting career has continued to evolve. He has scored more than 300 cuts and 100 singles, including 26 No. 1 hits in Country, Rock, and Adult Contemporary.

=== Big Loud Shirt ===
In conjunction with his focus on songwriting, Wiseman opened his own publishing company, Big Loud Shirt, in the fall of 2003. The first hit single in their catalog was "Live Like You Were Dying" by Tim McGraw in 2005, which won the Grammy Award for Best Country Song and was named NSAI Song of the Year, CMA Song of the Year, and ACM Song of the Year. Wiseman continues his songwriting success, sharing it with other company writers Chris Tompkins, Rodney Clawson, Sarah Buxton, Matt Dragstrem and the Warren Brothers.

In 2003, 2005 & 2007, ASCAP named him Songwriter of the Year. In 2009, he was named NSAI's Songwriter of the Decade, and he won the 2014 Heritage Award from ASCAP as the most performed country songwriter of the century. Additionally, Wiseman was nominated at the 2012 Grammy Awards for his role as producer on Red River Blue by Blake Shelton. He is also a member of the Nashville Songwriters Hall of Fame and was featured in Variety's Music City Impact Report in 2017, as well as Billboard’s Country Power Players in 2018 and 2019.

Big Loud Shirt officially changed its name to Big Loud Publishing in June 2017.

Wiseman has since staffed the company with a stable of award-winning hitmakers, including Rodney Clawson (George Strait’s "I Saw God Today," Luke Bryan’s "Crash My Party"), Chris Tompkins (Carrie Underwood’s "Before He Cheats", Dierks Bentley’s "Drunk on a Plane"), Tyler Hubbard (Bebe Rexha’s "Meant to Be," Jason Aldean’s "You Make It Easy", Florida Georgia Line’s "Cruise"), Brian Kelley (Jason Aldean’s "You Make It Easy," Florida Georgia Line’s "Cruise"), Morgan Wallen (Jason Aldean’s "You Make It Easy"), Joey Moi, Matt Dragstrem, Jamie Moore, Chris Lane, Ashley Leone, Madison Kozak, Ernest K. Smith and Griffen Palmer.

=== Big Loud ===
In 2011, Wiseman partnered with producer Joey Moi and artist managers Kevin "Chief" Zaruk and Seth England to found Big Loud Mountain Publishing and Management, an all-inclusive music company. In 2015, the partners expanded with a record label division – Big Loud Records – and merged all three companies (along with the newly-opened Big Loud Capital) to create Big Loud in 2017.

Under Wiseman's watch, Big Loud has grown from a songwriting business into a music-business hybrid, earning notability for some collaborations. for the digital age.

Wiseman's Big Loud has a guiding hand in the careers of country acts such as Florida Georgia Line, Morgan Wallen, Dallas Smith, Jake Owen, Chris Lane, HARDY, Mason Ramsey, and ERNEST, and continues to supply artists of all genres with a steady flow of ready-to-publish songs from their vault.

== Authorship, film ==
As a complement for Tim McGraw's Live Like You Were Dying, Wiseman co-wrote a book by the same title, which topped the New York Times bestseller list in 2004. He later wrote a follow-up journal to the book, which turned into a worship campaign in American churches. Additionally, he co-wrote the book A Baby Changes Everything in 2008, in conjunction with the No. 1 Faith Hill single of the same name. The following year, Wiseman starred in a reality TV show The Hitmen of Music Row, on Great American Country.

== Personal life ==
For the past 12 years, Wiseman has hosted The Stars of Second Harvest Show at the Ryman, giving all proceeds to the Second Harvest Food Bank of Middle Tennessee. To date, this concert event has raised $1,000,000 for the food bank.

Wiseman has been married to his wife KK since 1994.

== Publishing history ==
- 2004: Live Like You Were Dying by Wiseman and Tim Nichols (ISBN 978-1401602123)
- 2006: Live Like You Were Dying Journal by Wiseman and Nichols (ISBN 978-1401602925)
- 2008: A Baby Changes Everything by Wiseman, KK Wiseman, and Nichols (ISBN 978-1404187344)
