= The Outside (Boys Like Girls song) =

Single by Boys Like Girls

from the album Sunday at Foxwoods
- Released: July 28, 2023
- Genre: Pop punk
- Length: 4:04
- Label: Fearless
- Songwriters: Martin Johnson; Sean Foreman
- Producers: Johnson; Brandon Paddock; Danen Rector

Boys Like Girls singles chronology
"Language" (2023)	"The Outside" (2023)	"Cry" (2023)

Music video
- "The Outside" on YouTube

"The Outside" is a song by American rock band Boys Like Girls. The song was released on July 28, 2023, as the third single from their fourth studio album, Sunday at Foxwoods.

An "Outsiders Version" of the song was released on October 6, 2023, featuring 3OH!3, State Champs, The Summer Set, and The Ready Set. That version of the song peaked at number 24 on the Czech Republic Radio Airplay chart.

== Background ==
Speaking about the song, lead singer Martin Johnson stated: "20 years later, another outsider anthem about the same three best friends raised its hand. It's safe to say I'll always feel like I'm on the outside looking in. But I'll never be out there alone [...] whatever outside you call your own, raise 'em high and turn it up. This one's for you."

== Composition ==
"The Outside" was written by Martin Johnson and Sean Foreman. Johnson, along with Brandon Paddock and Danen Rector produced the track. Prior to the release of the song, he wrote it a few years back along with Foreman. Musically, the track is an upbeat pop punk song and is an ode to the band's early days growing up in the punk scene. According to Johnson in an interview with Alternative Press, the song was influenced by Tom Petty and the Heartbreakers' "American Girl", citing how "absolutely nothing in the chorus has anything at all to do with being American lyrically, yet the payoff is just as potent without the double down." The song was mixed at Blackbird Studio in Nashville.

== Outsiders Version ==
On October 6, 2023, the band released an "Outsiders Version" of the song, featuring 3OH!3, State Champs, The Summer Set, and The Ready Set. Writing "The Outside" with Sean Foreman of 3OH!3, Johnson "loved" the idea of working on a new version with 3OH!3. After booking shows for the Speaking Our Language Tour, Johnson became close friends with Derek DiScanio from State Champs and brought up an idea about a collaboration. He also contacted Brian Logan Dales of The Summer Set and Jordan Witzigreuter of The Ready Set, ultimately leading to an "Outsiders Version".

== Music video ==
A music video for the song was first released on July 28, 2023. Another music video for the "Outsiders Version" of the song was released on October 6, 2023, featuring appearances from 3OH!3, State Champs, The Summer Set, and The Ready Set, which also includes footage from their Speaking Our Language Tour.

== Track listing ==
Digital download – single
No.	Title	Length
1.	"The Outside"	4:04

Digital download – EP
No.	Title	Length
1.	"The Outside"	4:04
2.	"Language"	2:59
3.	"Blood and Sugar"	3:06

== Personnel ==
Credits for "The Outside" adapted from digital liner notes.

Boys Like Girls

- Martin Johnson – lead vocals, guitar, piano, keyboards, percussion
- Jamel Hawke – lead guitar, backing vocals
- Gregory James – bass guitar, backing vocals
- John Keefe – drums, backing vocals

Additional musicians

- Brandon Paddock – backing vocals, guitar, keyboards, programming
- Danen Rector – backing vocals, guitar, keyboards, percussion, programming
- Naomi Cooke Johnson – backing vocals

Production

- Martin Johnson – producer, mixing, recording
- Brandon Paddock – producer, mixing, recording
- Danen Rector – producer, mixing, recording
- Matt Huber – mixing
- Brian Lucey – mastering

== Charts ==
Chart performance for "The Outside (Outsiders Version)"
Chart (2024)	Peak position
Czech Republic Airplay (ČNS IFPI)	24

== Release history ==
Release dates and formats for "The Outside"
Region	Date	Format	Version	Label	Ref.
Various	July 28, 2023	Digital download	Original	Fearless	
Various	October 6, 2023	Digital download	Outsiders Version	Fearless	
