= 9 (Jason Aldean album) =

Studio album by Jason Aldean
- Released: November 22, 2019
- Studios: Treasure Isle Studios (Nashville, Tennessee)
- Genres: Country; country rock
- Length: 52:32
- Labels: Broken Bow; Macon Music
- Producer: Michael Knox

Jason Aldean chronology
Rearview Town (2018)	9 (2019)	Macon, Georgia (2021/2022)

Singles from 9
- 1. "We Back" Released: September 9, 2019; 2. "Got What I Got" Released: April 6, 2020; 3. "Blame It on You" Released: October 26, 2020

9 is the ninth studio album by American country music singer Jason Aldean. It was released on November 22, 2019 via Broken Bow Records. It debuted at No. 2 on the Billboard 200 chart. It also debuted at No. 1 on the Top Country Albums chart.

Professional ratings
Review scores
Source	Rating
AllMusic	2.5/5 stars
God Is in the TV	(favorable)
The Musical Divide	5/10 stars

== Content ==
As with all of Aldean's previous albums, 9 was released on Broken Bow Records, with Michael Knox serving as producer. The lead single is "We Back", a song that was co-written by Tyler Hubbard of Florida Georgia Line. A press release described the 16 tracks as "interwoven [...] in an era that's hyper-focused on singles". The album was noted to have stayed true to Aldean’s “foundation” with his “signature blend of country and rock”.

== Commercial performance ==
The album debuted at No. 2 on the Billboard 200 based on 83,000 equivalent album units, 68,000 of which are in traditional album sales. It also debuted at No. 1 on the Top Country Albums chart, which made it his seventh No. 1 on the chart. It sold a further 11,000 copies the second week. As of March 2020, the album has sold 143,300 copies in the United States, with 269,000 units consumed in total.

== Track listing ==
No.	Title	Writer(s)	Length
1.	"Tattoos and Tequila"	Michael Dulaney; Neil Thrasher	3:10
2.	"Blame It on You"	Kurt Allison; John Edwards; Tully Kennedy; Michael Tyler; Tyler Phillips; Brian Gene White	3:35
3.	"Champagne Town"	Matt Dragstrem; Josh Thompson	3:11
4.	"Some Things You Don't Forget"	Nick Brophy; Dulaney; Jennifer Hanson; Thrasher	3:19
5.	"Got What I Got"	Thomas Archer; Alex Palmer; Tyler	2:58
6.	"Keeping It Small Town"	Jaron Boyer; Ben Hayslip; Morgan Wallen	2:42
7.	"Camouflage Hat"	Hayslip; Jameson Rodgers; Thompson	3:35
8.	"Came Here to Drink"	Boyer; Palmer; Tyler	3:02
9.	"We Back"	Tyler Hubbard; Jordan Schmidt; Brad Warren; Brett Warren	3:17
10.	"Dirt We Were Raised On"	Rhett Akins; Boyer; Thompson	3:36
11.	"I Don't Drink Anymore"	Kelley Lovelace; CJ Solar; Thrasher	3:02
12.	"Cowboy Killer"	Boyer; Josh Hoge; Tyler	2:56
13.	"One for the Road"	Lynn Hutton; Brandon Kinney; Thompson	3:11
14.	"Talk About Georgia"	Allison; Kennedy; Tyler	2:44
15.	"The Same Way"	Brock Berryhill; Brantley Gilbert; Cole Taylor	3:21
16.	"She Likes It"	Boyer; Ben Stennis; Tyler	4:33
Total length:			52:12

== Personnel ==
Adapted from AllMusic

- Jason Aldean – lead vocals, backing vocals
- Tony Harrell – keyboards, synthesizer, Hammond B3 organ
- Blake Bollinger – programming
- Matt Dragstrem – programming
- Evan Hutchings – programming
- Michael Knox – programming
- Alexander Palmer – programming
- Ben Stennis – programming
- Kurt Allison – electric guitars, programming
- Danny Rader – acoustic guitars, 12-string guitar, hi-string guitar
- Adam Shoenfeld – electric guitars
- Mike Johnson – steel guitar, lap steel guitar
- Russ Pahl – steel guitar
- Tully Kennedy – bass, programming
- Rich Redmond – drums, percussion
- Perry Coleman – backing vocals
- Neil Thrasher – backing vocals
- Michael Tyler – backing vocals

== Production ==
- Michael Knox – producer
- Peter Coleman – recording
- Mickey Jack Cones – vocal recording at The Conderosa (College Grove, Tennessee)
- Jeff Braun – mixing at Anthem House (Nashville, Tennessee)
- Brandon Epps – assistant engineer, editing engineer
- Richard Dodd – mastering at Richard Dodd Mixing and Mastering (Nashville, Tennessee)
- Shalacy Griffin – production coordinator
- Joseph Llanes – photography
- Madalyn Hankins – art direction
- Kevin Tucker – design
- John Murphy – wardrobe stylist
- Brittany Williams Aldean – hair, make-up
- Maverick – management

== Charts ==
=== Weekly charts ===
Chart (2019)	Peak position
Australian Albums (ARIA)	16
Canadian Albums (Billboard)	14
Swiss Albums (Schweizer Hitparade)	69
US Billboard 200	2
US Independent Albums (Billboard)	1
US Top Country Albums (Billboard)	1

=== Year-end charts ===
Chart (2020)	Position
US Billboard 200	91
US Top Country Albums (Billboard)	6

Chart (2021)	Position
US Top Country Albums (Billboard)	16

Chart (2022)	Position
US Top Country Albums (Billboard)	60

== Certifications ==
Sale certifications for "9"
Region	Certification	Certified units/sales
United States (RIAA)	Gold	500,000^{‡}
^{‡} Sales+streaming figures based on certification alone.
