= Girl Like You (Jason Aldean song) =

Single by Jason Aldean

from the album Rearview Town
- Released: September 23, 2018
- Genre: Country rock; R&B
- Length: 3:12
- Label: Broken Bow; Macon
- Songwriters: Jaron Boyer; Josh Mirenda; Michael Tyler
- Producer: Michael Knox

Jason Aldean singles chronology
| "Drowns the Whiskey" (2018) | "Girl Like You" (2018) | "Rearview Town" (2019) |

"Girl Like You" is a song written by Jaron Boyer, Josh Mirenda, and Michael Tyler and recorded by American country music singer Jason Aldean. It was released in September 2018 as the third single from Aldean's 2018 album Rearview Town.

== Content ==
Billy Dukes of Taste of Country described the song as a "mid-tempo love song" and a "beat-driven slice of sultry country and hip-hop love." He also compared its hip-hop and R&B influences to "Burnin' It Down". One Country writer Annie Reuter also found R&B influences in Aldean's performance, saying that it was a "blend of rock and R&B influences" and that it had "soaring guitar parts, seductive beats and his slowed singing style", and that it had a theme about "a long night ahead with his love". Aldean told Nash Country Daily that "I've always loved big guitars and a good groove, but we've never really done it like this before. So, it's cool that we can do that coming off something like ['You Make It Easy' and 'Drowns the Whiskey']."

== Commercial performance ==
The song has sold 105,000 copies in the United States as of March 2019.

== Charts ==
=== Weekly charts ===
| Chart (2018–2019) | Peak position |
|---|---|
| Canada Hot 100 (Billboard) | 85 |
| Canada Country (Billboard) | 1 |
| US Billboard Hot 100 | 46 |
| US Country Airplay (Billboard) | 1 |
| US Hot Country Songs (Billboard) | 5 |

=== Year-end charts ===
| Chart (2018) | Position |
|---|---|
| US Hot Country Songs (Billboard) | 99 |
| Chart (2019) | Position |
| US Country Airplay (Billboard) | 8 |
| US Hot Country Songs (Billboard) | 33 |

== Certifications ==
| Region | Certification | Certified units/sales |
|---|---|---|
| Canada (Music Canada) | Platinum | 80,000^{‡} |
| United States (RIAA) | Platinum | 1,000,000^{‡} |
^{‡} Sales+streaming figures based on certification alone.
