= Rearview Town =

Studio album by Jason Aldean
- Released: April 13, 2018
- Genre: Country; country rock
- Length: 46:52
- Label: Broken Bow; Macon Music
- Producer: Michael Knox

Jason Aldean chronology
They Don't Know (2016)	Rearview Town (2018)	9 (2019)

Singles from Rearview Town
- 1. "You Make It Easy" Released: February 5, 2018; 2. "Drowns the Whiskey" Released: May 14, 2018; 3. "Girl Like You" Released: September 23, 2018; 4. "Rearview Town" Released: February 25, 2019

Professional ratings
Review scores
Source	Rating
AllMusic	3.5/5 stars
Paste	6.8

Rearview Town is the eighth studio album by American country music singer Jason Aldean. It was released on April 13, 2018, via Broken Bow Records. It debuted at the top of the Billboard 200 chart, becoming Aldean's fourth consecutive number one album in the United States.

== Content ==
As with all of Aldean's previous albums, Rearview Town was released on Broken Bow Records, with Michael Knox serving as producer. The lead single is "You Make It Easy", a song that was co-written by both members of Florida Georgia Line. The album includes a total of 15 songs, including a duet with Miranda Lambert. An article in Rolling Stone Country stated that the album's title track "hits on the theme of leaving the past behind and moving forward to something better."

== Commercial performance ==
"Rearview Town" debuted at number one on the Billboard 200 chart, making it his fourth consecutive studio album to do so. This also makes him only the second country music act after Rascal Flatts to have four consecutive albums debut at the top of that chart. It shifted 183,000 equivalent album units, of which 162,000 were in traditional album sales. It also debuted atop the Top Country Albums chart. It was the fifth best-selling album in the United States with 463,000 copies sold.

The album was certified Gold by the RIAA on August 8, 2018. It has sold 500,700 copies in the United States as of October 2019, and 1.32 million equivalent album units as of February 2020.

== Track listing ==
No.	Title	Writer(s)	Length
1.	"Dirt to Dust"	Jaron Boyer; Ben Stennis; Michael Tyler	2:48
2.	"Set It Off"	Brandon Kinney; Jody Stevens; Josh Thompson	2:50
3.	"Girl Like You"	Boyer; Josh Mirenda; Tyler	3:12
4.	"You Make It Easy"	Tyler Hubbard; Brian Kelley; Jordan Schmidt; Morgan Wallen	3:16
5.	"Gettin' Warmed Up"	Boyer; Mirenda; Cole Taylor	2:55
6.	"Blacktop Gone"	Brett Beavers; Deric Ruttan; Thompson	3:26
7.	"Drowns the Whiskey" (featuring Miranda Lambert)	Kinney; Jeff Middleton; Thompson	3:22
8.	"Rearview Town"	Kelley Lovelace; Bobby Pinson; Neil Thrasher	3:03
9.	"Love Me or Don't"	Hubbard; Schmidt; Wallen	3:13
10.	"Like You Were Mine"	Kurt Allison; Jonathan Edwards; Tully Kennedy; Brian Gene White	3:12
11.	"Better at Being Who I Am"	Casey Beathard; Wendell Mobley; Thrasher	3:19
12.	"I'll Wait for You"	Nick Brophy; Michael Dulaney; Jennifer Hanson; Thrasher	3:18
13.	"Ride All Night"	Dallas Davidson; Kyle Fishman; Houston Phillips	2:56
14.	"Up in Smoke"	Jessi Alexander; David Lee Murphy; Chris Stevens	3:05
15.	"High Noon Neon"	Tony Martin; Lee Thomas Miller; Thrasher	2:54
Total length:			46:49

== Personnel ==
Musicians

- Jason Aldean – lead vocals, background vocals
- Kurt Allison – electric guitar
- Blake Bollinger – drum programming
- Jaren Boyer – drum programming
- Perry Coleman – background vocals
- Kyle Fishman – drum programming
- Tony Harrell – Hammond B3, keyboards, strings, synthesizer
- Mike Johnson – steel guitar
- Tully Kennedy – bass guitar
- Michael Knox – drum programming
- Miranda Lambert – featured vocals on "Drowns the Whiskey"
- Miles McPherson – drum programming
- Josh Mirenda – background vocals
- Russ Pahl – steel guitar
- Danny Rader – bouzouki, acoustic guitar, tres
- Rich Redmond – drums, percussion
- Jerry Roe – drum programming
- Jordan Schmidt – drum programming
- Adam Shoenfeld – e-bow, electric slide guitar, electric guitar, talk box
- Jody Stevens – drum programming
- Neil Thrasher – background vocals
- Patrick Thrasher – drum programming
- Michael Tyler – background vocals

Technical

- Andrew Bissell – editing
- Jeff Braun – mixing
- Peter Coleman – engineering
- Mickey Jack Cones – engineering, vocal engineering
- Richard Dodd – mastering
- Brandon Epps – editing
- Michael Knox – production
- Sam Martin – engineering assistance
- Brady Tillow – engineering assistance

Visuals

- Madalyn Hankins – art direction
- Miller Mobley – photography
- Kevin Tucker – design

== Charts ==
=== Weekly charts ===
Chart (2018)	Peak position
Australian Albums (ARIA)	10
Canadian Albums (Billboard)	2
New Zealand Heatseeker Albums (RMNZ)	5
Scottish Albums (OCC)	75
Swiss Albums (Schweizer Hitparade)	43
UK Country Albums (OCC)	4
US Billboard 200	1
US Top Country Albums (Billboard)	1
US Independent Albums (Billboard)	1

=== Year-end charts ===
Chart (2018)	Position
US Billboard 200	30
US Top Country Albums (Billboard)	3
Chart (2019)	Position
US Billboard 200	72
US Top Country Albums (Billboard)	5
Chart (2020)	Position
US Top Country Albums (Billboard)	21
Chart (2021)	Position
US Top Country Albums (Billboard)	35
Chart (2022)	Position
US Top Country Albums (Billboard)	41
Chart (2023)	Position
US Top Country Albums (Billboard)	61

=== Decade-end charts ===
Chart (2010–2019)	Position
US Billboard 200	181

=== Singles ===
Year	Single	Peak chart positions				
Year	Single	US Country	US Country Airplay	US	CAN Country	CAN
2018	"You Make It Easy"	2	1	28	3	17
2018	"Drowns the Whiskey"	3	1	32	1	13
2018	"Girl Like You"	5	1	46	1	15
2019	"Rearview Town"	4	1	40	1	11

== Certifications ==
Region	Certification	Certified units/sales
Canada (Music Canada)	Platinum	80,000^{‡}
United States (RIAA)	Platinum	1,318,000 / 500,700
^{‡} Sales+streaming figures based on certification alone.
