= We Back =

Song written by Tyler Hubbard and recorded by Jason Aldean

Single by Jason Aldean

from the album 9
- Released: September 9, 2019
- Genre: Country rock
- Length: 3:17
- Label: Broken Bow; Macon Music
- Songwriters: Tyler Hubbard; Jordan Schmidt; Brad Warren; Brett Warren
- Producer: Michael Knox

Jason Aldean singles chronology
"Rearview Town" (2019)	"We Back" (2019)	"Got What I Got" (2020)

"We Back" is a song recorded by American country music singer Jason Aldean. It is the lead single to his ninth studio album, 9. Then-Florida Georgia Line member Tyler Hubbard wrote the song with Jordan Schmidt and Brad and Brett Warren, the latter two of whom are known as The Warren Brothers.

== Content and history ==
Aldean said that the idea for the song came when he sent a request to Tyler Hubbard, one-half of the musical duo Florida Georgia Line, asking for a song with "tempo" to it. He wanted a song that would serve as an upbeat, rock-driven lead single to a new album, because the previous album (Rearview Town) was dominated by ballads. Within a few days, Hubbard contacted him with the finished song, which Aldean immediately liked and chose to record. The blog Taste of Country describes the song as a country rock anthem comparable in theme to "The Only Way I Know", "Gonna Know We Were Here", and "They Don't Know".

== Charts ==
=== Weekly charts ===
Chart (2019–2020)	Peak position
Canada Hot 100 (Billboard)	95
Canada Country (Billboard)	1
US Billboard Hot 100	62
US Country Airplay (Billboard)	6
US Hot Country Songs (Billboard)	8

=== Year-end charts ===
Chart (2019)	Position
US Hot Country Songs (Billboard)	93
Chart (2020)	Position
US Country Airplay (Billboard)	34
US Hot Country Songs (Billboard)	41

== Certifications ==
Certifications for "We Back"
Region	Certification	Certified units/sales
Canada (Music Canada)	Gold	40,000^{‡}
^{‡} Sales+streaming figures based on certification alone.
