= Blood and Sugar =

2023 single by Boys Like Girls

Single by Boys Like Girls

from the album Sunday at Foxwoods
- Released: May 19, 2023
- Genre: Pop rock
- Length: 3:06
- Label: Fearless
- Songwriters: Martin Johnson; Brandon Paddock; Spencer Stewart
- Producers: Johnson; Paddock; Danen Rector

Boys Like Girls singles chronology
"Red Cup, Hands Up, Long Brown Hair" (2013)	"Blood and Sugar" (2023)	"Language" (2023)

"Blood and Sugar" is a song by American pop rock band Boys Like Girls. It was released on May 19, 2023, through Fearless Records. It is the band's first new song in over ten years and serves as the lead single from their fourth studio album Sunday at Foxwoods (2023).

== Background ==
In 2022, Boys Like Girls began performing concerts in Australia, Philippines, and the United States, including a performance at When We Were Young in October 2022. Throughout their comeback tour, the group performed the song "The Outside", an unreleased track from their upcoming fourth studio album. On May 15, 2023, the band began to tease new music across their social media platforms. The following day, the band announced that they would release "Blood and Sugar" on May 19, 2023, and their fourth studio album in the fall.

== Composition ==
A pop rock song, "Blood and Sugar" was written by Martin Johnson, Brandon Paddock, and Spencer Stewart and was produced by Johnson, Paddock, and Danen Rector.

== Release history ==
Release dates and formats for "Blood and Sugar"
Region	Date	Format	Label	Ref.
Various	May 19, 2023	Digital download; streaming	Fearless Records	
