= Got What I Got =

2020 single by Jason Aldean

Single by Jason Aldean

from the album 9
- Released: April 6, 2020
- Genre: Country, R&B, country pop
- Length: 2:58
- Label: Broken Bow; Macon Music
- Songwriters: Thomas Archer; Alex Palmer; Michael Tyler
- Producer: Michael Knox

Jason Aldean singles chronology
"We Back" (2019)	"Got What I Got" (2020)	"Blame It on You" (2020)

"Got What I Got" is a song written by Thomas Archer, Alex Palmer and Michael Tyler, and recorded by American country music singer Jason Aldean. It was released in April 2020 as the second single from his ninth studio album 9.

Peaking at number 16 on the Billboard Hot 100, it became his highest-charting single since 2014's "Burnin' It Down" peaked at number 12.

== Content ==
The song explains how the narrator (Aldean) does not miss what he had in life before his current family, and though it took a lot to get there, he would do it all again to get back to where he is today.

Aldean has said that it is his wife's favorite song on the album, stating that she enjoys the "hip hop" sound of this song.

== Charts ==
=== Weekly charts ===
Weekly chart performance for "Got What I Got"
Chart (2020)	Peak position
Canada Hot 100 (Billboard)	60
Canada Country (Billboard)	1
Global 200 (Billboard)	104
US Billboard Hot 100	16
US Country Airplay (Billboard)	1
US Hot Country Songs (Billboard)	2
US Rolling Stone Top 100	23

=== Year-end charts ===
Year-end chart performance for "Got What I Got"
Chart (2020)	Position
US Billboard Hot 100	60
US Country Airplay (Billboard)	14
US Hot Country Songs (Billboard)	7

== Certifications ==
Certifications for "Got What I Got"
Region	Certification	Certified units/sales
United States (RIAA)	2× Platinum	2,000,000^{‡}
^{‡} Sales+streaming figures based on certification alone.
