= Rearview Town (song) =

Single by Jason Aldean

from the album Rearview Town
- Released: February 25, 2019
- Genre: Country rock
- Length: 3:03
- Label: Broken Bow; Macon
- Songwriters: Kelley Lovelace; Bobby Pinson; Neil Thrasher
- Producer: Michael Knox

Jason Aldean singles chronology
"Girl Like You" (2018)	"Rearview Town" (2019)	"We Back" (2019)

"Rearview Town" is a song written by Kelley Lovelace, Bobby Pinson, and Neil Thrasher and recorded by American country music singer Jason Aldean. It was released in February 2019 as the fourth and final single from Aldean's 2018 album of the same name.

== Music video ==
The music video premiered on April 15, 2019, and was directed by Shaun Silva. It features Aldean singing the song behind a moving wall containing past pictures and video of his life and career, ending with a shot of him walking down a dirt road.

== Commercial performance ==
"Rearview Town" became Jason Aldean's 31st top 10 hit on the Billboard Hot Country Songs chart in July 2019. It reached No. 1 on Billboard Country Airplay chart dated August 31, 2019, which made this Aldean's 21st No. 1 on the chart, also making Aldean sixth in ranking as artist with the most No. 1 songs on the chart. The song has sold 112,000 copies in the United States as of September 2019.

== Charts ==
=== Weekly charts ===
Chart (2019)	Peak position
Canada Hot 100 (Billboard)	75
Canada Country (Billboard)	1
US Billboard Hot 100	40
US Country Airplay (Billboard)	1
US Hot Country Songs (Billboard)	4

=== Year-end charts ===
Chart (2019)	Position
US Country Airplay (Billboard)	21
US Hot Country Songs (Billboard)	23

== Certifications ==
Region	Certification	Certified units/sales
Canada (Music Canada)	Platinum	80,000^{‡}
United States (RIAA)	Platinum	1,000,000^{‡}
^{‡} Sales+streaming figures based on certification alone.
