= Adam Doleac =

Country singer and songwriter

- Born: April 15, 1988 (age 38); Hattiesburg, Mississippi
- Genre: Country
- Occupations: Singer, songwriter
- Instruments: Vocals, guitar
- Years active: 2015–present
- Label: Sony Music Nashville/Arista Nashville
- Spouse: MacKinnon Morrissey (m. 2022)
- Website: www.adamdoleac.com

Adam Doleac is an American country music singer and songwriter signed to Arista Nashville. He has written songs with Darius Rucker and Kane Brown.

== Early life ==
Doleac grew up in Hattiesburg, Mississippi. His father and grandfather ran an electrical business. A natural athlete, Doleac passed up the family business to pursue sports. Before becoming a country music artist, Doleac excelled at many sports and played baseball for the University of Southern Mississippi, eventually appearing in the College World Series.

Doleac grew up listening to artists like Amos Lee, Dave Matthews Band, and John Mayer. His first country concert was Toby Keith.

== Career ==
Early in Doleac's career, the song "Whiskey's Fine", from his independent EP, caught the attention of SiriusXM's "The Highway Channel". The song would eventually reach number three on the Sirius XM "The Highway's" Hot Country Countdown. Doleac also started having success as a co-writer with other artists including Darius Rucker with whom he wrote the song "Don't". Doleac was then named to numerous rising star lists, including "Pandora Radio's 2018 Artists to Watch" and Rolling Stone Country's "New Country Artist You Need to Know".

In October 2019, Sony Music Nashville signed Doleac to the Arista Nashville imprint. The single "Famous" spent two weeks at No. 1 on Sirius XM "The Highway's" Hot Country Countdown, and was supported with a music video featuring former Bachelor couple Colton Underwood and Cassie Randolph. Doleac also released new pop-driven EP called Famous: The Remixes, just as the original version of "Famous" crossed 2 million streams on Spotify.

Doleac celebrated the support he has received from his parents with the track "Mom and Daddy’s Money" released in 2018. In January 2019, Doleac supported country artist Ryan Hurd on tour with Niko Moon, followed by more touring with Mitchell Tenpenny and Scotty McCreery.

Doleac's debut studio album, Barstool Whiskey Wonderland, was released on September 30, 2022.

== Discography ==
=== Albums ===
- Barstool Whiskey Wonderland (Arista/Sony Music Nashville, 2022)

=== EPs ===
- Famous: The Remixes (Independent, 2019)
- Adam Doleac (Independent, 2017)

=== Singles ===
List of singles, with selected chart positions, showing other relevant details
Title	Year	Peak chart positions	Album
Title	Year	US Country Airplay	Album
"Famous"	2020	60	Barstool Whiskey Wonderland
"Drinkin' It Wrong"	2022	50	Barstool Whiskey Wonderland
