= Drowns the Whiskey =

Single by Jason Aldean featuring Miranda Lambert

from the album Rearview Town
- Released: May 14, 2018
- Genre: Country
- Length: 3:22
- Label: Broken Bow; Macon
- Songwriters: Brandon Kinney; Jeff Middleton; Josh Thompson
- Producer: Michael Knox

Jason Aldean singles chronology
"You Make It Easy" (2018)	"Drowns the Whiskey" (2018)	"Girl Like You" (2018)

Miranda Lambert singles chronology
"Keeper of the Flame" (2018)	"Drowns the Whiskey" (2018)	"It All Comes Out in the Wash" (2019)

"Drowns the Whiskey" is a song written by Josh Thompson, Brandon Kinney, and Jeff Middleton and recorded by American country music singer Jason Aldean featuring Miranda Lambert. It was released in May 2018 as the second single from Aldean's album Rearview Town.

== History and content ==
The song is a steel guitar-led song with neotraditional country influences. In it, the male narrator sings about his vain attempts to "drown" the memory of a former loved one by drinking whiskey, but instead observes that the memory of said lover "drowns the whiskey."

Aldean said that he was a "big fan" of Lambert, and had wanted to do a second duet with her after "Grown Woman", an album track from his 2007 album Relentless. After she expressed indifference to the first song he had suggested to her, he sent her "Drowns the Whiskey" and she agreed to perform on it.

== Commercial performance ==
The song reached No. 1 on the Country Airplay chart for chart dated August 25, 2018, where it then stayed for a further week. It is Aldean's 19th, and Lambert's 6th, No. 1 on the Country Airplay chart. It also reached No. 3 on the Hot Country Songs for chart dated September 1, 2018. It has sold 242,000 copies in the United States as of December 2018.

== Music video ==
The music video for the song was released on June 18, 2018. It retells the song's story in an "empty Nashville dive bar".

== Live performances ==
Aldean performed the song live on the CMT Music Awards on June 6, 2018. Lambert did not attend the performance, so backing vocalists in his road band performed her part. Aldean and Lambert performed the song live together for the first time on the 52nd Annual Country Music Association Awards telecast together on November 14, 2018.

== Charts ==
=== Weekly charts ===
Chart (2018)	Peak position
Canada Hot 100 (Billboard)	53
Canada Country (Billboard)	1
US Billboard Hot 100	32
US Country Airplay (Billboard)	1
US Hot Country Songs (Billboard)	3

=== Year-end charts ===
Chart (2018)	Position
US Country Airplay (Billboard)	34
US Hot Country Songs (Billboard)	13

== Certifications ==
Region	Certification	Certified units/sales
Canada (Music Canada)	Gold	40,000^{‡}
United States (RIAA)	Platinum	1,000,000^{‡}
^{‡} Sales+streaming figures based on certification alone.
