= Blame It on You =

2021 single by Jason Aldean

Single by Jason Aldean

from the album 9
- Released: October 26, 2020
- Genre: Country; power ballad
- Length: 3:35
- Label: Broken Bow
- Songwriters: Michael Tyler; Brian Gene White; John Edwards; Kurt Allison; Tully Kennedy
- Producer: Michael Knox

Jason Aldean singles chronology
"Got What I Got" (2020)	"Blame It on You" (2020)	"If I Didn't Love You" (2021)

"Blame It on You" is a song written by Michael Tyler, Brian Gene White, John Edwards, Kurt Allison and Tully Kennedy, and recorded by American country music singer Jason Aldean. It was released on October 26, 2020 as the third single from his ninth studio album 9.

== Music video ==
The music video was released on January 28, 2021, and directed by Shaun Silva. It told a story about a young couple rise and fall relationship in the 1940s.

== Chart performance ==
The song reached No. 5 on the Hot Country Songs chart and No. 1 on Country Airplay, becoming Aldean's 23rd No. 1 on the latter format.

== Live performance ==
On May 3, 2021, Aldean performed the song on Jimmy Kimmel Live!.

== Charts ==
=== Weekly charts ===
Weekly chart performance for "Blame It on You"
Chart (2020–2021)	Peak position
Australia Country Hot 50 (TMN)	14
Canada Hot 100 (Billboard)	47
Canada Country (Billboard)	1
US Billboard Hot 100	30
US Country Airplay (Billboard)	1
US Hot Country Songs (Billboard)	5

=== Year-end charts ===
Year-end chart performance for "Blame It on You"
Chart (2021)	Position
US Country Airplay (Billboard)	12
US Hot Country Songs (Billboard)	31
