= Michael Tyler =

- Birth name: Michael Tyler Spragg
- Origin: Thayer, Missouri, U.S.
- Genres: Country
- Occupation(s): Singer, songwriter
- Instrument: Vocals
- Years active: 2016–present
- Labels: Reviver

Michael Tyler Spragg is an American country music singer. He has released the album 317 via Reviver Records, and in 2017 he charted the single "They Can't See". Additionally, he has written singles for Dierks Bentley and Jason Aldean.

== Biography ==
Michael Tyler Spragg was born in Thayer, Missouri. He began performing music at age eight, and at age thirteen, he was mentored by Michael Knox, who is Jason Aldean's record producer. Knox invited Tyler to Nashville, Tennessee, where he began performing at Tootsie's Orchid Lounge. This led to him securing a songwriter contract with Peer Music, in addition to writing songs for Aldean, LoCash, and other artists. Among the songs Tyler wrote was Dierks Bentley's "Somewhere on a Beach", which went to number one on the Billboard Country Airplay charts.

In 2017, Tyler signed with Reviver Records, the same independent label to which LoCash was signed at the time. That same year he released his debut album 317. The album included the single "They Can't See", which was also made into a music video. The video included guest appearances from songwriter Shane Minor and song publisher Charlie Monk. "They Can't See" charted for 21 weeks on Billboard Country Airplay, peaking at number 46.

Although he released no other singles or albums, he continued to write songs for Aldean, including the singles "Girl Like You", "Got What I Got", and "Blame It on You". These songs led to him signing a second songwriting contract with CTM Outlander in 2023. Tyler also co-wrote "Mind on You" by George Birge and "Holy Smokes" by Bailey Zimmerman.

== Discography ==
- 317 (2017)

Year	Single	Peak chart positions
Year	Single	US Country Airplay
2017	"They Can't See"	46
