= The Band Camino =

American rock band

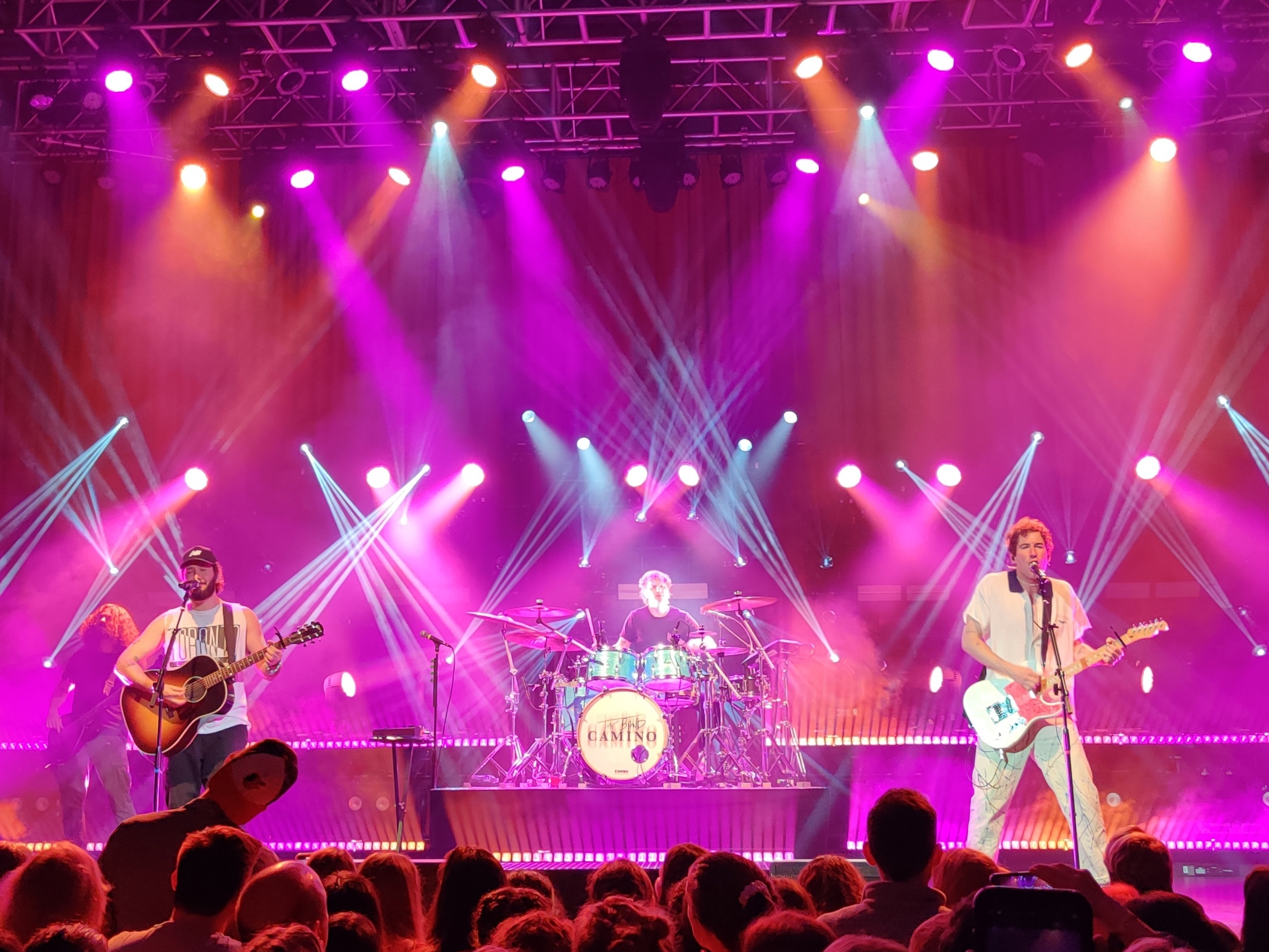
- The Band Camino playing in April 2022

Background information
- Origin: Memphis, Tennessee, United States
- Genres: Indie rock; electropop
- Years active: 2015–present
- Label: Elektra
- Members: Jeffery Jordan; Spencer Stewart; Garrison Burgess
- Past members: Andrew Isbell; Graham Rowell; Caleb Hughes
- Website: www.thebandcamino.com

The Band Camino (stylized as The Band CAMINO) is an American rock band. Established in Memphis, Tennessee, in 2015, the group is now based in Nashville.

== History ==
Andrew Isbell, Jeffery Jordan, Graham Rowell, and Spencer Stewart established the Band Camino in 2015 while the four were students at the University of Memphis. Isbell played drums, Rowell was bassist, and Jordan and Stewart sang and played guitar. The band released their first EP in 2016, My Thoughts On You. Their second EP, Heaven, was released in 2017; Isbell left the band around this time and was replaced by Garrison Burgess.

By May 2019, the Band Camino had signed to Elektra Records and released an EP tryhard, in August. To promote the release, the group embarked on a headlining tour of North America from September through October, plus two dates in the United Kingdom. On April 9, 2020, bassist Graham Rowell was removed from the group after accusations of sexual misconduct between him and fans surfaced online. Later that year on July 31, 2020, the band released "Crying Over You" with Chelsea Cutler.

On December 11, 2020, the group released its first song, "Roses", from its self-titled album. This was followed by "1 Last Cigarette" on February 26, 2021, "Sorry Mom" on April 30, and "Know It All" on June 25. Their self-titled debut album was released on September 10, 2021.

On February 21, 2023, the band released their first single since 2021, "Told You So", and went on tour in Europe. On April 21, 2023, the band released their next single, "What Am I Missing?". On May 26, 2023 the band released their third track from the album, "Last Man in the World". On June 17, 2023, the band performed at the Bonnaroo Music & Arts Festival for the first time. On June 26, 2023, the band then announced their second album, The Dark which was released on August 11, 2023, alongside a North American headlining tour titled "Screaming In The Dark Tour" and released a single titled "See You Later". On February 25, 2024, the band performed in Manila, Philippines for the first time as part of the Bobapalooza Music and Arts Festival.

On May 13, 2024, the band announced its next EP, Bruises, which was released on May 17, 2024, alongside a summer tour titled "The Taking Shape Tour".

On July 25, 2025 the band released its next album, NeverAlways (later retitled to NeverAlways (Vol. 1)), featuring the singles "Baggy Jeans", "Stupid Questions", and "What You Can't Have". A single later found on NeverAlways (Vol. 2), "12:34" was released three months later on October 6, 2025 at 12:34 PM CT. The second single, "Afterthought" was released on December 3, 2025, 3.5 years since its first tease on TikTok, which garnered attention among their fanbase, leading the band to finally release it. Their third single, "Holly!", was released on April 17, 2026 alongside an announcement of NeverAlways (Vol. 2), the second half of the double album which was released on May 26, 2026 and was preceded by a fourth single, "Do What You Gotta Do" two days earlier.

== Musical style ==
Timothy Monger at Allmusic describes the Band Camino's musical approach as a blend of indie rock and electropop.

== Band members ==
Current

- Jeffery Jordan – vocals, keyboard, guitar (2015–present)
- Spencer Stewart – vocals, keyboard, guitar (2015–present)
- Garrison Burgess – drums (2018–present), bass (2020–present)

Former

- Andrew Isbell – drums (2015–2017)
- Caleb Hughes – drums (2017–2018)
- Graham Rowell – bass (2015–2020)

== Discography ==
The Band Camino discography
- Studio albums: 4
- EPs: 4
- Singles: 31

=== Albums ===
List of albums
Title	Album details	Peak chart positions
Title	Album details	US
The Band Camino	Released: September 10, 2021; Label: Elektra; Track listing: 1. "Everybodydies"; 2. "Roses"; 3. "Underneath My Skin"; 4. "I Think I Like You"; 5. "Know It All"; 6. "Who Do You Think You Are?"; 7. "Sorry Mom"; 8. "Just A Phase"; 9. "1 Last Cigarette"; 10. "Song About You"; 11. "Damage"; 12. "Look Up"; 13. "Help Me Get Over You"; 14. "Get It Your Way"	—
The Dark	Released: August 11, 2023; Label: Elektra; Track listing: 1. "Told You So"; 2. "What Am I Missing?"; 3. "Save My Life"; 4. "Let It Happen"; 5. "It's You (It's You)"; 6. "Same Page"; 7. "See You Later"; 8. "Afraid of the Dark"; 9. "Novocaine"; 10. "Three Month Hangover"; 11. "Last Man in the World"	112
NeverAlways (Vol. 1)	Released: July 25, 2025; Label: Atlantic Records; Track listing: 1. "HasJustBegun"; 2. "Pieces"; 3. "What You Can't Have"; 4. "Limbo"; 5. "Baggy Jeans"; 6. "Can't Go Back"; 7. "Hates Me Yet (222)"; 8. "Me Around You"; 9. "Stupid Questions"; 10. "Karaoke"; 11. "Infinity"	—
NeverAlways (Vol. 2)	Released: May 22, 2026; Label: Atlantic Records; Track listing: 1. "Holly!"; 2. "Mascara"; 3. "Afterthought"; 4. "Do What You Gotta Do"; 5. "Mirror Mirror"; 6. "Another Body"; 7. "Talk Cheap, Die Broke"; 8. "12:34"; 9. "Dancer"; 10. "Never and Always"; 11. "What's Always Been"	—

=== Extended plays ===
List of EPs
Title	EP details
My Thoughts on You	Released: April 1, 2016; Label: Self-released; Track listing: 1. "2/14"; 2. "For a While"; 3. "Free of Charge"; 4. "The Back and White; 5. "Yøung"
Heaven	Released: June 2, 2017; Label: Self-released; Track listing: 1. "California"; 2. "Who Says We're Through"; 3. "What I Want" (Note: "What I Want" was originally included on Heaven but was later also added to Tryhard. On streaming services, it is not included on the Heaven track list.); 4. "My Thoughts on You"; 5. "Heaven"
Tryhard	Released: August 23, 2019; Label: Elektra; Track listing: 1. "What I Want"; 2. "Hush Hush"; 3. "Daphne Blue"; 4. "Honest"; 5. "See Through"; 6. "Haunted"; 7. "Farsighted"; 8. "Break Me"
Bruises	Released: May 17, 2024; Label: Elektra; Track listing: 1. "Someone Who's Trying"; 2. "Nostalgia"; 3. "Bruises"

=== Singles ===
List of singles and originating albums
Song	Year	Album
"2/14"	2016	My Thoughts on You
"I Spend Too Much Time in My Room"	2016	Non-album single
"Who Says We're Through?"	2017	Heaven
"My Thoughts on You" (Note: Despite the title, "My Thoughts on You" (the song) is not featured on the band's debut EP of the same name.)	2017	Heaven
"Berenstein"	2017	Non-album single
"Fool of Myself"	2018	Non-album single
"Know Me"	2018	Non-album single
"Less Than I Do"	2018	Non-album single
"Something To Hold on To"	2019	Non-album single
"Daphne Blue"	2019	Tryhard
"See Through"	2019	Tryhard
"Crying Over You" (Solo version or featuring Chelsea Cutler)	2020	Non-album single
"Roses"	2020	The Band Camino
"1 Last Cigarette"	2021	The Band Camino
"Sorry Mom"	2021	The Band Camino
"Know It All"	2021	The Band Camino
"I Think I Like You"	2021	The Band Camino
"Never a Good Time" (NOTD featuring The Band Camino)	2021	Noted...EP
"Told You So"	2023	The Dark
"What Am I Missing?"	2023	The Dark
"Last Man in the World"	2023	The Dark
"See You Later"	2023	The Dark
"Infinity"	2025	NeverAlways
"Baggy Jeans"	2025	NeverAlways
"Stupid Questions" / "Hates Me Yet (222)"	2025	NeverAlways
"What You Can't Have"	2025	NeverAlways
"12:34"	2026	NeverAlways Vol. 2
Afterthought	2026	NeverAlways Vol. 2
Holly!	2026	NeverAlways Vol. 2
Do What You Gotta Do	2026	NeverAlways Vol. 2
