= You Make It Easy =

Single by Jason Aldean

from the album Rearview Town
- Released: February 5, 2018
- Genre: Country
- Length: 3:16
- Label: Broken Bow; Macon
- Songwriters: Tyler Hubbard; Brian Kelley; Morgan Wallen; Jordan Schmidt
- Producer: Michael Knox

Jason Aldean singles chronology
"They Don't Know" (2017)	"You Make It Easy" (2018)	"Drowns the Whiskey" (2018)

"You Make It Easy" is a song written by then-Florida Georgia Line members Tyler Hubbard and Brian Kelley with Morgan Wallen and Jordan Schmidt and recorded by American country music singer Jason Aldean. It was released in 5 February 2018 as the first single from Aldean's 2018 album Rearview Town.

== Content ==
Brian Kelley and Tyler Hubbard, who comprise the duo Florida Georgia Line, wrote the song with Morgan Wallen and Jordan Schmidt. It is the fourth song co-written by the duo that Aldean has recorded, after the singles "Burnin' It Down" and "Lights Come On", and the album cut "Black Tears".

According to Wallen, Hubbard was inspired by his wife, Hayley, and the relationship that the two have despite Hubbard being constantly on the road as a musician. Wallen also stated that he had most of the song written starting with the hook, when Schmidt added the "groove". The song features a 6/8 time signature which Cillea Houghton of Taste of Country compared to Keith Urban's 2017 hit "Blue Ain't Your Color". In it, Aldean sings of loving his wife, and how she "make[s] it easy" to love her in return.

== Commercial performance ==
On the chart dated February 3, 2018, "You Make It Easy" debuted at number 26 on the US Billboard Country Airplay chart. The next week, it debuted at number 28 on the Billboard Hot 100 due to strength of digital sales. The song reached number one on the Country Airplay for chart dated May 5, 2018, thus becoming Aldean's 18th number one hit.

"You Make It Easy" sold 77,000 copies in its first week of sales. It was the top-selling country song of the week. It has sold 601,000 copies in the United States as of January 2019. In 2026, it was certified Diamond by RIAA.

== Music video ==
The song features a three-part music video spanning 15 minutes, directed by Shaun Silva. In it, actor Luke Benward plays a man who is injured in a car accident. Silva said that he was inspired by the video for "What Hurts the Most" by Rascal Flatts, which he also directed.

== Charts ==
=== Weekly charts ===
Chart (2018)	Peak position
Canada Hot 100 (Billboard)	63
Canada Country (Billboard)	1
US Billboard Hot 100	28
US Country Airplay (Billboard)	1
US Hot Country Songs (Billboard)	2

=== Year-end charts ===
Chart (2018)	Position
US Billboard Hot 100	70
US Country Airplay (Billboard)	22
US Hot Country Songs (Billboard)	4

== Certifications ==
Region	Certification	Certified units/sales
Canada (Music Canada)	3× Platinum	240,000^{‡}
New Zealand (RMNZ)	Platinum	30,000^{‡}
United States (RIAA)	Diamond	601,000
^{‡} Sales+streaming figures based on certification alone.
