= Sum 41 discography =

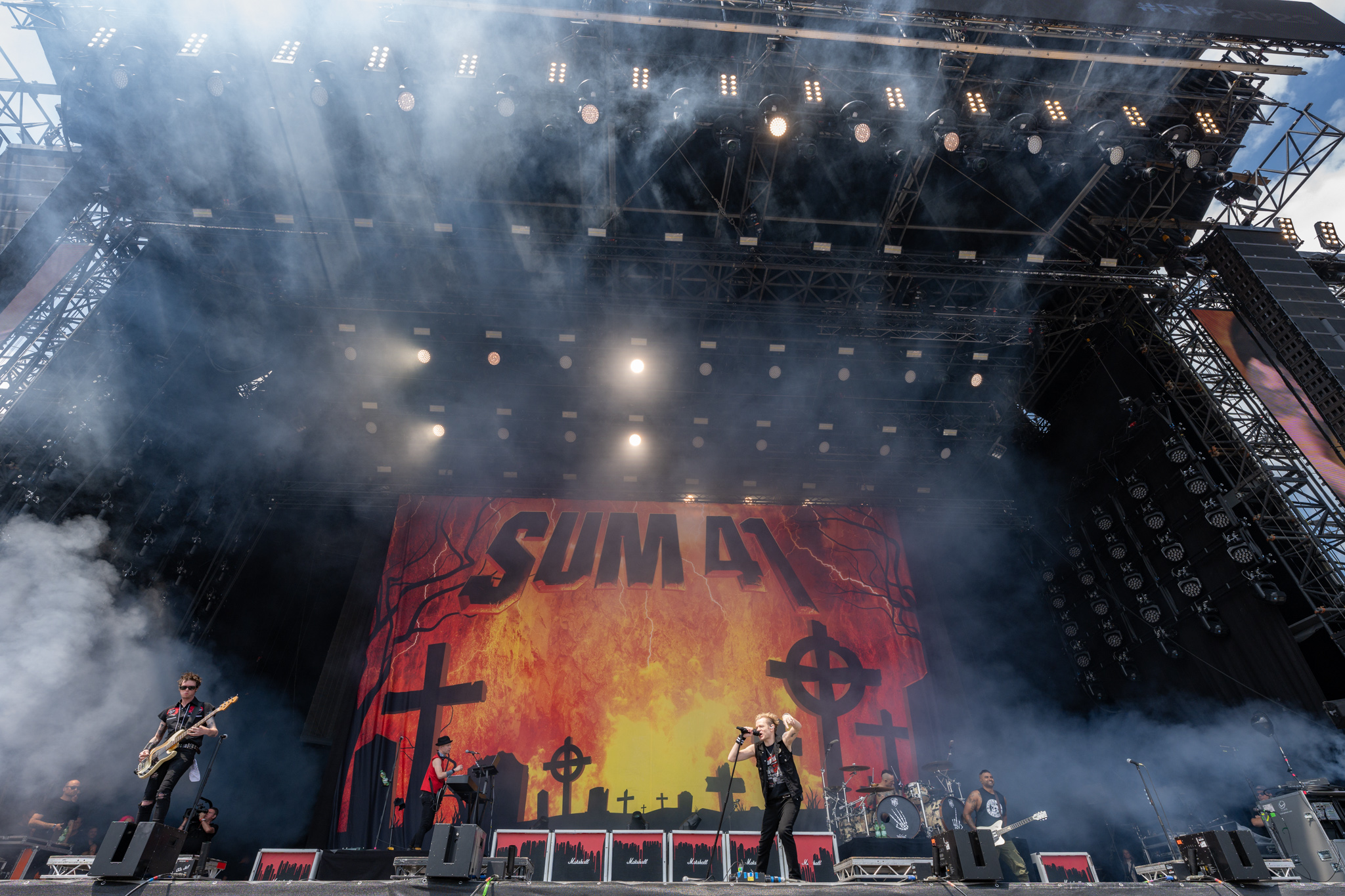
- Sum 41 at Rock im Park in 2023
- Studio albums: 8
- Extended plays: 2
- Live albums: 3
- Compilation albums: 1
- Singles: 26
- B-sides: 9
- Video albums: 5
- Music videos: 33
- Promotional singles: 7
- Demo: 1

This is the complete discography of the Canadian rock band Sum 41. The band has released eight studio albums, three live albums, one compilation album, five video albums, 33 music videos, two EPs, 26 singles, nine B-sides, seven promotional singles, and one demo album.

== Albums ==
=== Studio albums ===
List of studio albums, with selected chart positions, sales figures and certifications
Title	Album details	Peak chart positions										Sales	Certifications
Title	Album details	CAN	AUS	AUT	BEL	FRA	GER	JPN	SWI	UK	US	Sales	Certifications
All Killer No Filler	Released: May 8, 2001; Label: Aquarius/Island	9	33	19	11	25	29	50	39	7	13	UK: 612,193	MC: 3× Platinum; ARIA: Gold; BPI: 2× Platinum; RIAA: Platinum; RIAJ: Gold
Does This Look Infected?	Released: November 26, 2002; Label: Aquarius/Island	8	56	49	49	28	58	12	17	39	32		MC: Platinum; BPI: Gold; IFPI SWI: Gold; RIAA: Gold; RIAJ: Platinum; SNEP: Gold
Chuck	Released: October 12, 2004; Label: Aquarius/Island	2	13	35	84	9	32	2	14	59	10		MC: 2× Platinum; BPI: Silver; RIAA: Gold; RIAJ: Gold
Underclass Hero	Released: July 24, 2007; Label: Aquarius/Island	1	22	8	85	17	10	2	9	46	7		MC: Gold; RIAJ: Gold
Screaming Bloody Murder	Released: March 29, 2011; Label: Island	9	16	23	75	25	23	7	21	66	31		
13 Voices	Released: October 7, 2016; Label: Hopeless	6	13	13	38	51	9	17	14	16	22		IMPALA: 2× Gold
Order in Decline	Released: July 19, 2019; Label: Hopeless	13	55	11	21	29	9	43	7	29	60	UK: 1,758	
Heaven :x: Hell	Released: March 29, 2024; Label: Rise; Formats: CD, CS, LP, digital download	37	72	3	11	8	4	50	3	26	108	UK: 3,611; US: 41,000	
"—" denotes a recording that did not chart or was not released in that territory.

=== Live albums ===
List of live albums, with selected chart positions
Title	Album details	JPN
Does This Look Infected Too?	Released: 2003; Label: Aquarius/Island	18
Go Chuck Yourself	Released: December 21, 2005; Label: Aquarius/Island	19
Live at the House of Blues, Cleveland 9.15.07	Released: August 9, 2011; Label: Island	—
"—" denotes a recording that did not chart or was not released in that territory.

=== Compilation albums ===
List of compilation albums, with selected chart positions and certifications
Title	Album details	Peak chart positions			Certifications
Title	Album details	CAN	JPN	US	Certifications
All the Good Shit: 14 Solid Gold Hits 2000–2008	Release: March 17, 2009; Label: Aquarius/Island	89	7	154	BPI: Gold; RIAJ: Gold

=== Re-recording albums ===
Title	Album details
Diamonds of the Night: Vol. 1 (with Deryck Whibley)	Scheduled release: March 19, 2027; Formats: CD, LP

=== Demo tapes ===
List of demo tapes
Title	Details
Rock Out With Your C*ck Out (Note: known by fans as Rock Out with Your Cock Out)	Release: 1998; Label: Self-released

== Extended plays ==
List of EPs, with selected chart positions and certifications
Title	EP details	Peak chart positions			Certifications
Title	EP details	JPN	UK	US	Certifications
Half Hour of Power (Note: Some sources consider Half Hour of Power a studio album and other sources consider it an extended play.)	Released: June 13, 2000; Label: Aquarius	62	143	176	MC: Gold; BPI: Silver
Chuck: Acoustic	Released: February 22, 2005; Label: Universal	—	—	—	
"—" denotes a release that did not chart.

== Singles ==
List of singles as lead artist, with selected peak chart positions and certifications
Title	Year	Peak chart positions										Certifications	Album
Title	Year	CAN	CAN Rock	AUS	GER	IRL	ITA	UK	UK Rock	US	US Alt	Certifications	Album
"Makes No Difference"	2000	—	26	—	—	—	—	—	—	—	32		Half Hour of Power
"Fat Lip"	2001	33	x	58	42	16	30	8	2	66	1	BPI: Platinum; RIAA: 2× Platinum; RMNZ: Platinum	All Killer No Filler
"In Too Deep"	2001	20	x	29	69	12	—	13	1	—	10	BPI: 2× Platinum; FIMI: Gold; PROMUSICAE: Gold; RIAA: 2× Platinum; RMNZ: Platinum	All Killer No Filler
"Motivation"	2002	—	x	—	—	40	—	21	3	—	24		All Killer No Filler
"What We're All About"	2002	—	x	63	91	23	30	32	4	—	—		Music from and Inspired by Spider-Man
"Still Waiting"	2002	40	x	43	90	20	21	16	1	— (Note: "Still Waiting" did not enter the Billboard Hot 100, but peaked at number six on the Bubbling Under Hot 100 chart.)	7	BPI: Gold; BVMI: Gold; FIMI: Platinum; PROMUSICAE: Gold; RIAA: Platinum; RIAJ: Gold; RMNZ: Gold	Does This Look Infected?
"The Hell Song"	2003	—	x	76	—	31	37	35	4	—	13	BPI: Silver; FIMI: Gold; RIAA: Gold	Does This Look Infected?
"Over My Head (Better Off Dead)"	2003	—	x	62	—	—	—	—	—	—	—		Does This Look Infected?
"We're All to Blame"	2004	—	12	—	—	—	—	—	—	—	10		Chuck
"Pieces"	2005	9	2	—	84	—	—	—	—	— (Note: "Pieces" did not enter the Billboard Hot 100, but peaked at number seven on the Bubbling Under Hot 100 chart.)	14	FIMI: Gold; RIAA: Gold	Chuck
"Some Say"	2005	—	14	—	—	—	—	—	—	—	—		Chuck
"Underclass Hero"	2007	33	8	76	76	—	—	188	—	— (Note: "Underclass Hero" did not enter the Billboard Hot 100, but peaked at number 16 on the Bubbling Under Hot 100 chart.)	34		Underclass Hero
"Walking Disaster"	2007	—	24	—	—	—	—	—	—	—	26		Underclass Hero
"With Me"	2008	37	35	—	—	—	—	—	—	—	—	FIMI: Gold; RIAA: Gold	Underclass Hero
"Screaming Bloody Murder"	2011	72	12	—	—	—	—	—	36	—	37		Screaming Bloody Murder
"Baby You Don't Wanna Know"	2011	—	23	—	—	—	—	—	—	—	—		Screaming Bloody Murder
"Fake My Own Death"	2016	—	45	—	—	—	—	—	—	—	—		13 Voices
"War"	2016	—	22	—	—	—	—	—	—	—	—		13 Voices
"Out for Blood"	2019	—	10	—	—	—	—	—	—	—	— (Note: "Out For Blood" did not enter the Alternative Airplay chart, but peaked at number 16 on the Mainstream Rock Airplay chart.)		Order in Decline
"A Death in the Family"	2019	—	—	—	—	—	—	—	—	—			Order in Decline
"Never There"	2019	—	—	—	—	—	—	—	—	—	— (Note: "Never There" did not enter the Alternative Airplay chart, but peaked at number 32 on the Mainstream Rock Airplay chart.)		Order in Decline
"45 (A Matter of Time)"	2019	—	—	—	—	—	—	—	—	—			Order in Decline
"Landmines"	2023	— (Note: "Landmines" did not enter the Billboard Canadian Hot 100, but peaked at number 47 on the Canadian Digital Song Sales chart.)	1	—	—	—	—	—	—	—	1	MC: Gold	Heaven :x: Hell
"Rise Up"	2023	—	—	—	—	—	—	—	—	—	—		Heaven :x: Hell
"Waiting on a Twist of Fate"	2024	—	—	—	—	—	—	—	—	—	—		Heaven :x: Hell
"Dopamine"	2024	—	1	—	—	—	—	—	—	—	1		Heaven :x: Hell
"With Me (First Dance Version)" (with Deryck Whibley)	2026	—N/a											Diamonds of the Night: Vol. 1
"—" denotes a release that did not chart. "×" denotes periods where charts did not exist or were not archived.

=== Promotional singles ===
List of singles as lead artist, with selected peak chart positions
Title	Year	Peak chart positions		Album
Title	Year	CAN	BEL	Album
"Handle This"	2002	—	—	All Killer No Filler
"No Reason"	2005	—	—	Chuck
"March of the Dogs"	2007	47	—	Underclass Hero
"Blood in My Eyes"	2012	—	—	Screaming Bloody Murder
"God Save Us All (Death to Pop)"	2016	—	—	13 Voices
"Goddamn I'm Dead Again"	2017	—	—	13 Voices
"Catching Fire" (solo or featuring nothing,nowhere)	2021	—	—	Order in Decline
"—" denotes a release that did not chart.

== Other appearances ==
- "Rock You" - a cover of Helix from the movie soundtrack FUBAR: The Album.
- "Things I Want" - with Tenacious D for the KROQ compilation Swallow My Eggnog.
- "Unwritten Christmas" - with Unwritten Law for the KROQ compilation Swallow My Eggnog.
- "Little Know It All" - guest performance with Iggy Pop, later released as a single for the record Skull Ring.
- "Get Back" (Sum 41 rock remix) - a collaboration with Ludacris for the iTunes versions of Chuck and The Red Light District albums.
- "Killer Queen" - a cover of Queen recorded for the Killer Queen: A Tribute to Queen album.
- "Attitude" - a Misfits cover which was released only on the band's Myspace in 2006, during the recording sessions for Underclass Hero.
- "Loser" - a song by DJ Yodah and Mötley Crüe drummer Tommy Lee, featuring Lil Wayne, Sparkdawg, Big Sean, Joell Ortiz, J-Son, & Sum 41 under Geffen Records.
- "Moron" - was recorded for Rock Against Bush Vol 1. A re-recorded version later appeared as a bonus track on the Japanese edition of Chuck.
- "Morning Glory" - an Oasis acoustic cover which Deryck has performed by himself.
- "How You Remind Me" - a cover of Nickelback which was perform on MTV's 2001 New Year's Anniversary.
- "Paint It Black" - a cover of The Rolling Stones which was performed during almost all of the 2010 tour dates with guitarist Tom Thacker singing lead vocals. A studio version of this cover has been officially released on Heaven :x: Hell.
- "Rebel Yell" - a cover of Billy Idol which was performed during the early 2011 shows.
- "American Girl" - a cover of Tom Petty and the Heartbreakers which was performed during the early 2011 shows.
- "Master of Puppets" - a cover of Metallica which the band has performed during the MTV Icon of Metallica in 2003, and again through the 2009–2010 tour dates, randomly.
- "Enter Sandman" - a cover of Metallica which the band has performed during the MTV Icon of Metallica in 2003, and again through the 2009–2010 tour dates, randomly.
- "For Whom the Bell Tolls" - a cover of Metallica which the band has performed during the MTV Icon of Metallica in 2003, and again through the 2009–2010 tour dates, randomly.
- "Motorbreath" - a cover of Metallica which the band has performed during the MTV Icon of Metallica in 2003, and again through the 2009–2010 tour dates, randomly.
- "Battery" - a cover of Metallica which the band has performed during the MTV Icon of Metallica in 2003, and again through the 2009–2010 tour dates, randomly.
- "Blackened" - a cover of Metallica which the band has performed during the MTV Icon of Metallica in 2003, and again through the 2009–2010 tour dates, randomly.
- "Stone Cold Crazy" - a cover of Queen
- "We Will Rock You" - a cover of Queen
- King of the Hill - episode "Reborn to Be Wild"

== Videos ==
=== Video albums ===
Year	Album details	Certifications (sales thresholds)
2001	Introduction to Destruction: Released: 2001; Label: Aquarius, Island	MC: Gold
2002	Cross the T's and Gouge Your I's: Released: November 26, 2002; Label: Island	
2003	Sake Bombs and Happy Endings: Released: May 17, 2003; Label: Aquarius, Universal	MC: Gold
2005	Rocked: Sum 41 in Congo: Released: 2005; Label: War Child	
2008	DeeVeeDee: Released: March 2008; Label: Island	

=== Music videos ===
Year	Song	Director(s)
2000	"Makes No Difference"	Bradley Walsh
2001	"Fat Lip"	Marc Klasfeld
2001	"Pain for Pleasure"	Marc Klasfeld
2001	"In Too Deep"	Marc Klasfeld
2002	"Motivation"	Super America and Joseph Kahn
2002	"It's What We're All About"	Marc Klasfeld
2002	"Still Waiting"	Marc Klasfeld
2002	"The Hell Song"	Marc Klasfeld
2003	"Over My Head (Better Off Dead)"	Chris Hafner
2003	"Little Know It All" (Iggy Pop featuring Sum 41)	Mike Piscitelli
2004	"We're All to Blame"	Marc Klasfeld
2004	"Pieces"	Brett Simon and Steve Jocz
2005	"Some Say"	Sean Michael Turrell
2007	"Underclass Hero"	Steve Jocz and Marc Klasfeld
2007	"Walking Disaster"	Stephen Penta
2008	"With Me"	Steve Jocz
2011	"Screaming Bloody Murder" (unreleased)	Steve Jocz
2011	"Baby, You Don't Wanna Know"	Marc Klasfeld
2012	"Blood in My Eyes"	Michael Maxxis
2016	"Fake My Own Death"	Marc Klasfeld
2016	"War"	Djay Brawner
2016	"God Save Us All (Death to Pop)"	Blake Higgins at Blakeprimes Digital
2017	"Goddamn I'm Dead Again"	Marc Klasfeld
2019	"Out for Blood"	Lee Levin
2019	"A Death in the Family"	Dale Resteghini
2019	"Never There"	John Asher
2019	"45 (A Matter of Time)"	Lewis Cater
2021	"Catching Fire"	John Asher
2023	"Landmines"	John Asher
2023	"Rise Up"	John Asher
2024	"Waiting on a Twist of Fate"	Ravi Dhar
2024	"Dopamine"	Ravi Dhar
2025	"Radio Silence"	Ravi Dhar
