= All the Good Shit =

All the Good Shit: The Best of Sum 41

Greatest hits album by Sum 41
- Released: November 26, 2008
- Recorded: 2000–2008
- Genre: Pop punk; punk rock; alternative rock; skate punk; melodic hardcore
- Length: 45:46
- Label: Island (worldwide); Aquarius (Canada)
- Producer: Greig Nori, Jerry Finn, Deryck Whibley

Sum 41 non-studio album chronology
Go Chuck Yourself (2006)	All the Good Shit: The Best of Sum 41 (2008)	Live at the House of Blues, Cleveland 9.15.07 (2011)

8 Years of Blood, Sake and Tears
- 8 Years of Blood, Sake and Tears cover

Professional ratings
Review scores
Source	Rating
AllMusic	4/5 stars

All the Good Shit: 14 Solid Gold Hits 2000–2008 (known as 8 Years of Blood, Sake and Tears: The Best of Sum 41 2000–2008 in Japan) is a greatest hits album by Canadian rock band Sum 41. The Japanese version was released on November 26, 2008, and the worldwide version was released on March 17, 2009. This is the band's first greatest hits album. It includes singles from each of the band's studio albums, as well as a previously unreleased song, "Always". The release also includes a bonus DVD with all of the band's music videos (excluding "Some Say" and "Handle This").

== Track listing ==
All lyrics are written by Deryck Whibley; all music is composed by Sum 41

Universal track listing
No.	Title	Original album	Length
1.	"Still Waiting"	Does This Look Infected?	2:38
2.	"The Hell Song"	Does This Look Infected?	3:21
3.	"Fat Lip"	All Killer No Filler	2:58
4.	"We're All to Blame"	Chuck	3:38
5.	"Walking Disaster"	Underclass Hero	4:46
6.	"In Too Deep"	All Killer No Filler	3:27
7.	"Pieces"	Chuck	3:01
8.	"Underclass Hero"	Underclass Hero	3:16
9.	"Motivation"	All Killer No Filler	2:52
10.	"Makes No Difference" (alternative version)	Half Hour of Power	3:10
11.	"With Me"	Underclass Hero	4:51
12.	"Handle This"	All Killer No Filler	3:37
13.	"Over My Head (Better Off Dead)"	Does This Look Infected?	2:29
14.	"Pain for Pleasure"	All Killer No Filler	1:42
Total length:			45:46

All the Good Shit Best Buy bonus tracks
No.	Title	Length
15.	"Always" (previously unreleased)	3:22
16.	"Motivation" (live at the House of Blues in Cleveland, Ohio)	3:45
Total length:		52:53

All the Good Shit iTunes bonus tracks
No.	Title	Length
15.	"The Hell Song" (live at the Orange Lounge, Toronto)	3:17
16.	"With Me" (video)	4:53
17.	"Fat Lip" (video)	3:20
18.	"In Too Deep" (video)	3:41
Total length:		60:57

8 Years of Blood, Sake and Tears bonus tracks
No.	Title	Length
15.	"Always" (previously unreleased)	3:22
16.	"The Hell Song" (live at the Orange Lounge, Toronto)	3:17
17.	"Motivation" (live at the House of Blues in Cleveland, Ohio)	3:45
Total length:		56:10

DVD (music videos)
No.	Title	Length
1.	"Fat Lip"
2.	"Pain for Pleasure"
3.	"Makes No Difference"
4.	"In Too Deep"
5.	"Motivation"
6.	"The Hell Song"
7.	"Over My Head (Better Off Dead)"
8.	"Still Waiting"
9.	"We're All to Blame"
10.	"Pieces"
11.	"Underclass Hero"
12.	"Walking Disaster"
13.	"With Me"

== Personnel ==
- Deryck Whibley – lead vocals, rhythm guitar, keyboards, piano (all tracks); lead guitar (tracks 5, 8, 10, 11, 15), drums (track 14)
- Dave Baksh – lead guitar, backing vocals (all tracks, except 5, 8, 10, 11, 15, 16, 17)
- Tom Thacker – lead guitar, backing vocals (tracks 16, 17)
- Cone McCaslin – bass guitar, backing vocals (all tracks)
- Steve Jocz – drums, backing vocals (all tracks); lead vocals (track 3, 14)

=== Production and mixing ===
- Tracks 1, 2, 7, 13 produced by Greig Nori
- Tracks 3, 6, 9, 12, 14 produced by Jerry Finn
- Tracks 4 & 10 produced by Greig Nori & Deryck Whibley
- Tracks 5, 8, 11, 15 produced by Deryck Whibley
- Tracks 1, 7, 13 mixed by Andy Wallace
- Tracks 2–4, 6, 9, 12, 14 mixed by Tom Lord-Alge
- Tracks 5, 8, 11 mixed by Chris Lord-Alge
- Track 10 mixed by Jerry Finn
- Track 15 mixed by Deryck Whibley

== Charts ==
Chart performance for All the Good Shit
Chart (2025)	Peak position
Canadian Albums (Billboard)	89

== Certifications ==
Certifications for All the Good Shit
Region	Certification	Certified units/sales
Japan (RIAJ)	Gold	100,000^{^}
United Kingdom (BPI)	Gold	100,000^{‡}
^{^} Shipments figures based on certification alone.^{‡} Sales+streaming figures based on certification alone.

== Release history ==
Country	Date
Japan	November 26, 2008
United States	March 17, 2009
Canada	March 31, 2009
