= Go Chuck Yourself =

Live album by Sum 41
- Released: December 21, 2005 (Happy Live Surprise); March 7, 2006 (Go Chuck Yourself)
- Recorded: April 11, 2005
- Venue: London, Ontario
- Genre: Pop punk, alternative rock, alternative metal
- Length: 67:06
- Label: Island (US); Universal (Japan, Europe); Aquarius (Canada)
- Producer: Deryck Whibley, Tom Lord-Alge

Sum 41 non-studio album chronology
Chuck Acoustic EP (Tour Edition Promo) (2005)	Go Chuck Yourself (2005)	All the Good Shit (2009)

Happy Live Surprise
- Happy Live Surprise cover

Professional ratings
Review scores
Source	Rating
AllMusic	link

Go Chuck Yourself (released as Happy Live Surprise in Japan) is a live album by Canadian rock band Sum 41 recorded in London, Ontario in April 2005.

"Nothing on My Back", "Machine Gun", "That's All Right" (Arthur Crudup cover), "In Too Deep", and "Angels with Dirty Faces" were also performed; however, are omitted from the album.

It was first released on December 21, 2005, in Japan, and was packaged with a bonus DVD featuring five songs from the show and Basketball Butcher. The North American and European version was released on March 7, 2006, without the DVD. The album debuted at #51 on the Canadian Albums Chart.

== Track listing ==
All tracks are written by Sum 41.

No.	Title	Originally appeared on	Length
1.	"The Hell Song"	Does This Look Infected?	3:21
2.	"My Direction"	Does This Look Infected?	2:21
3.	"Over My Head (Better Off Dead)"	Does This Look Infected?	3:11
4.	"A.N.I.C."	Does This Look Infected?	0:43
5.	"Never Wake Up"	All Killer No Filler	1:08
6.	"We're All to Blame"	Chuck	3:44
7.	"There's No Solution"	Chuck	4:48
8.	"No Brains"	Does This Look Infected?	4:32
9.	"Some Say"	Chuck	3:30
10.	"Welcome to Hell"	Chuck	4:26
11.	"Grab the Devil by the Horns and Fuck Him Up the Ass" (credited as “Grab the Devil”)	Half Hour Of Power	1:14
12.	"Makes No Difference"	Half Hour of Power	5:46
13.	"Pieces"	Chuck	3:04
14.	"Motivation"	All Killer No Filler	3:47
15.	"Still Waiting"	Does This Look Infected?	2:43
16.	"88"	Chuck	5:35
17.	"No Reason" (with "Intro")	Chuck	3:48
18.	"I Have a Question"		0:32
19.	"Moron"	Chuck (Japanese edition)	2:28
20.	"Fat Lip"	All Killer No Filler	3:05
21.	"Pain for Pleasure" (featuring Matt DeLong of No Warning)	All Killer No Filler	3:06

Japanese bonus DVD
No.	Title	Length
1.	"The Hell Song" (live)
2.	"Fat Lip" (live)
3.	"Still Waiting" (live)
4.	"No Brains" (live)
5.	"We're All to Blame" (live)
6.	"Basketball Butcher" (short film)

== Setlist ==
1. "The Hell Song"
2. "My Direction"
3. "Over My Head (Better Off Dead)"
4. "A.N.I.C."
5. "Never Wake Up"
6. "We're All to Blame"
7. "Nothing on My Back"
8. "There's No Solution"
9. "No Brains"
10. "Some Say"
11. "Machine Gun"
12. "That's All Right" (Arthur Crudup cover)
13. "In Too Deep"
14. "Angels with Dirty Faces"
15. "Welcome to Hell"
16. "Grab the Devil by the Horns and Fuck Him Up the Ass"
17. "Makes No Difference"
18. "Pieces"
19. "Motivation"
20. "Still Waiting"
21. "88"

Encore

22. "No Reason" (with "Intro")
23. "Moron"
24. "Fat Lip"
25. "Pain for Pleasure" (featuring Matt DeLong of No Warning)

Note

- "Nothing on My Back", "Machine Gun", "That's All Right", "In Too Deep", and "Angels with Dirty Faces" were performed; but, not included on the album.
