= Some Say =

Some Say may refer to:

- "Some Say" (Nea song), a 2019 song by Swedish singer Nea
- "Some Say" (Sum 41 song), a 2004 song by Canadian band Sum 41
