= Introduction to Destruction =

- The DVD cover of Introduction to Destruction
- Starring: Deryck Whibley; Dave Baksh; Jason McCaslin; Steve Jocz
- Distributed by: Island; Aquarius Records
- Release date: 2001
- Language: English

Introduction to Destruction is Sum 41's first DVD. It was released in 2001.

== Contents ==
The DVD contains film of a sold-out live concert at the Astoria in London and all available music videos at the time including outtakes, commentary and behind the scenes features. In addition, there are five home movies Sum 41 when they were in grade 11, five feature films (with optional commentary), photographs and a special "hidden" weblink (which is no longer in service).

== Astoria show track listing ==
1. "Motivation"
2. "Nothing On My Back"
3. "Makes No Difference"
4. "Rhythms"
5. "In Too Deep"
6. "All She's Got"
7. "Handle This"
8. "Machine Gun"
9. "Crazy Amanda Bunkface"
10. "It's What We're All About"
11. "Fat Lip"
