= Rocked: Sum 41 in Congo =

- DVD cover
- Directed by: Adrian Callender
- Starring: Sum 41: Deryck Whibley; Dave Baksh; Cone McCaslin; Steve Jocz
- Distributed by: War Child Canada
- Release date: 2005
- Running time: 50 min
- Language: English

Rocked: Sum 41 in Congo is a 2005 film documentary directed by Adrian Callender describing the experiences of Sum 41 joining War Child Canada in traveling to the Democratic Republic of the Congo (DRC). Eric Hoskins, President of War Child Canada at the time, and Samantha Nutt, Executive Director of War Child Canada, accompanied Sum 41 to DRC in May 2004 and are credited as Executive Producers. Canadian peacekeeper Chuck Pelletier helped Sum 41 evacuate from DRC. He is the namesake of the band's October 2004 album, Chuck.
