= Sum 41 =

Canadian rock band (1996–2025)

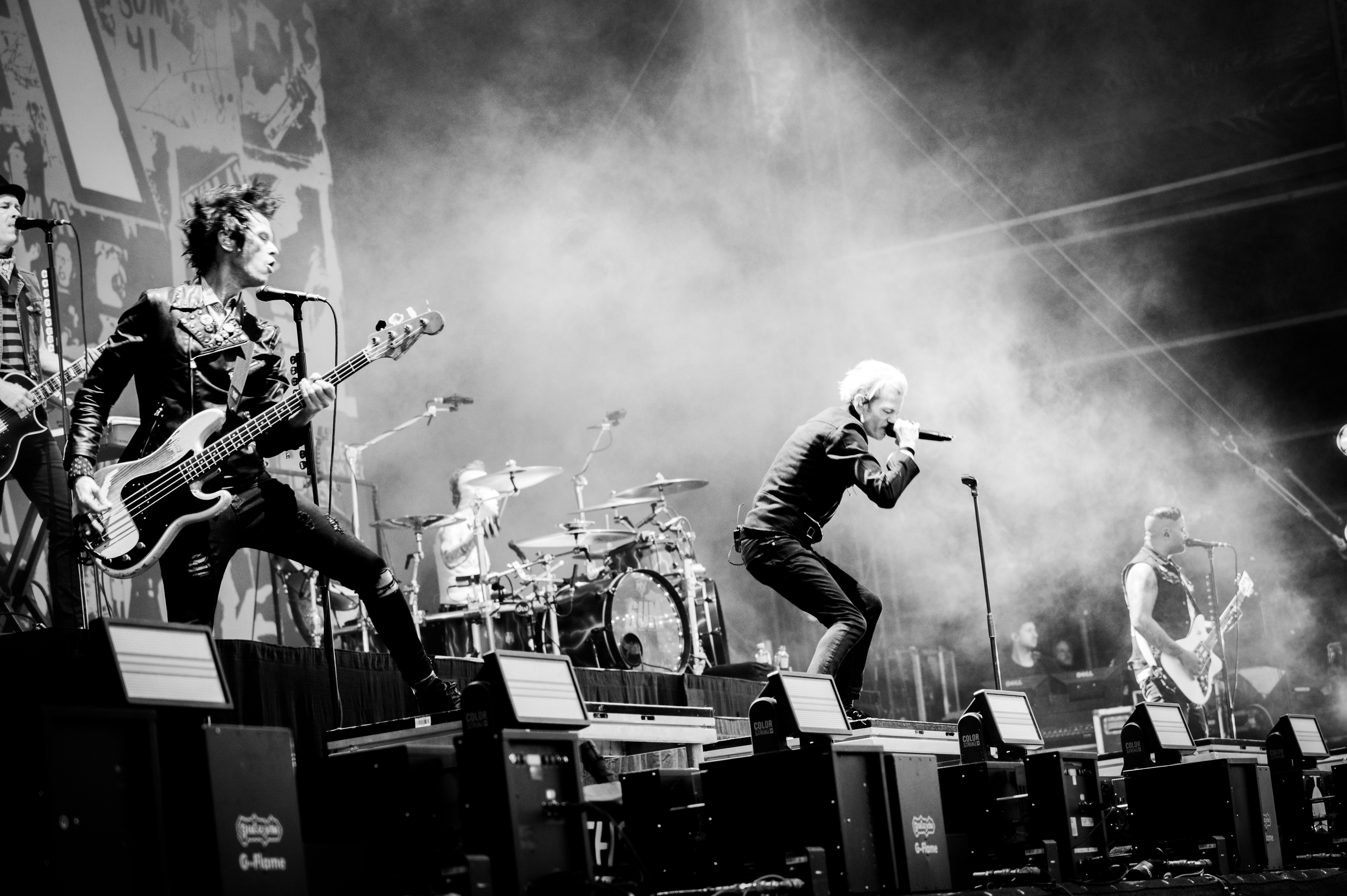
- Sum 41 at Southside Festival in 2024

Background information
- Also known as: Pain for Pleasure
- Origin: Ajax, Ontario, Canada
- Genres: Pop-punk; alternative metal; melodic hardcore; alternative rock
- Works: Discography
- Years active: 1996–2025
- Labels: Island; Aquarius; Hopeless; Rise
- Spinoffs: The Operation M.D.; Brown Brigade; Organ Thieves; Gravas
- Spinoff of: Kaspir
- Past members: Deryck Whibley; Steve Jocz; Jon Marshall; Grant McVittie; Richard Roy; Dave Baksh; Mark Spicoluk; Jason McCaslin; Tom Thacker; Frank Zummo
- Website: sum41.com

Sum 41 was a Canadian rock band formed in Ajax, Ontario, in 1996. The band's final lineup consisted of Deryck Whibley (lead vocals, rhythm guitar, keyboards), Jason McCaslin (bass, backing vocals), Dave Baksh (lead guitar, backing vocals), Tom Thacker (rhythm and lead guitars, keyboards, backing vocals), and Frank Zummo (drums). Founding drummer Steve Jocz was also a core member until his departure in 2013, performing on their first five studio albums.

In 1999, Sum 41 signed an international record deal with Island Records and released its first EP, Half Hour of Power, in 2000. The band released its debut album, All Killer No Filler, in 2001. The album achieved mainstream success with its first single, "Fat Lip", which reached number one on the Billboard Modern Rock Tracks chart and remains the band's most successful single to date. The album's next singles "In Too Deep" and "Motivation" also achieved commercial success. All Killer No Filler was certified platinum in both the United States and the United Kingdom and triple platinum in Canada. In 2002, the band released Does This Look Infected?, which was also a commercial and critical success. The singles "The Hell Song" and "Still Waiting" both charted highly on the modern rock charts.

The band released its next album, Chuck, in 2004, led by singles "We're All to Blame" and "Pieces". The album proved successful, peaking at number 10 on the Billboard 200. In 2007, the band released Underclass Hero, which was met with a mixed reception, but became the band's highest-charting album to date. It was also the band's last album on Aquarius Records. The band released the album Screaming Bloody Murder, on Island Records in 2011 to mixed reception. It also fell short of its predecessors' commercial success. The band's sixth studio album, 13 Voices was released in 2016, through Hopeless Records. IMPALA awarded the album with a double gold award for 150,000 sold copies across Europe. The band's seventh studio album Order in Decline was released on July 19, 2019. The band's eighth and final studio album, Heaven :x: Hell, was released on March 29, 2024. The band disbanded in March 2025, following a final worldwide headlining tour and their induction into the Canadian Music Hall of Fame. Following the band's disbandment, Whibley prepared an acoustic re-recording album of Sum 41 material, Diamonds of the Night: Vol. 1, scheduled for release in March 2027 under both his and the band's names.

The band often performed more than 100 times each year and held long global tours, most of which lasted more than a year. The group was nominated for seven Juno Awards and won twice – Group of the Year in 2003, and Rock Album of the Year for Chuck in 2005. Sum 41 was nominated for a Grammy Award for Best Hard Rock/Metal Performance for the song "Blood in My Eyes". From their formation to 2016, Sum 41 were the 31st best-selling Canadian artist in Canada.

== History ==
=== 1994–1998: Formative years ===
Sum 41 has its origins in the band Kaspir, which was formed by Deryck Whibley and Grant McVittie in 1994, inspired by Weezer and Nirvana. As time went on, the band's drummer was replaced by Steve Jocz and the music became increasingly inspired by NOFX, particularly their 1991 album Ribbed. Seeing this change as too sonically dissimilar to their original sound, they decided to form a new band and to change their sound because they sounded "like the early nineties rock music we used to listen to, and don't anymore". The band chose the name "Sum 41" after looking at the calendar and counting how many days it had been from the start of their summer break to the day the Warped Tour was on and seeing that it was forty-one days. The band debuted its new name during Supernova's Battle of the Bands on September 28, 1996. The first lineup to use this name included Whibley, Jocz, McVittie and Jon Marshall. Another early member was bassist Richard Roy who shortly replaced McVittie.

Their first televised live performance was at Jonopalooza, on the Canadian teen talk show Jonovision hosted by Trailer Park Boys star, and Canadian comedian, Jonathan Torrens.

The band met their manager and producer Greig Nori, also the lead vocalist of the band Treble Charger, in 1996 at Jonopalooza, and Whibley convinced Nori to watch his band perform. Nori was not impressed with the band's songs or the original vocalist Jon Marshall and advised Whibley to be the vocalist instead causing Marshall to leave. With Whibley moving to lead vocals and rhythm guitar, Dave Baksh, a friend of Deryck and Steve and fellow student at Exeter High School, joined as lead guitarist. During the band's first tour in New Brunswick, the band was involved in a near-fatal car accident, when their Ford Econoline van was broadsided by an F-150; Roy, who was driving the van, quit the band after returning home. Mark Spicoluk briefly filled in as the band's new bassist in 1998, until he was replaced by Jason McCaslin, another friend of the band's and student at Exeter High School, in 1999. In 1996, the band opened for Len.

=== 1998–2000: Half Hour of Power ===
In 1998, the band recorded a demo tape on compact cassette which they sent to record companies in the hope of getting a recording contract.

From 1999 to 2000, the band recorded several new songs. The Introduction to Destruction and later the Cross The T's and Gouge Your I's DVDs both contain the self-recorded footage, which show the band performing a dance to "Makes No Difference" in front of a theatre.

After signing with Island Records in 1999, Sum 41's first EP, Half Hour of Power, was released on June 27, 2000. The first single released by the band was "Makes No Difference", which had two different music videos. The first video was put together using the video clips sent to the major label, and the second showed the band performing at a house party. The album was certified platinum in Canada.

=== 2001–2003: All Killer No Filler and Does This Look Infected? ===
Sum 41's first full-length album, All Killer No Filler, was released on May 8, 2001. The album was certified platinum by the Recording Industry Association of America in August 2001. "Fat Lip", the album's first single, achieved significant chart and commercial success; it topped the US Billboard Modern Rock Tracks chart as well as many other charts around the world. The song remains the band's most successful to date. After "Fat Lip", two more singles were released from the album: "In Too Deep" and "Motivation". "In Too Deep" peaked at number 10 on the Modern Rock Tracks chart, while "Motivation" peaked at number 24 on the same chart. The album peaked at number 13 on the Billboard 200 chart and at number nine on the Top Canadian Albums chart. The album was a commercial success, and was certified Platinum in the United States, UK, and triple platinum in Canada The album's name was taken from the initial reaction from Joe Mcgrath, an engineer working in the studio.

The band spent much of 2001 touring; the group played over 300 concerts that year before returning to the studio to record another album. The band took part in the 2001 Vans Warped Tour and the Campus Invasion Tour. In April 2002, the band went on a month long tour called the Sum Like it Loud Tour.

On May 3, 2002, Spider-Man was released in theaters which featured an extended version of the song from Sum 41's first album "Half Hour of Power" called "What We're All About", which in the album was combined with another short song called "Dave's Possessed Hair". The song was listed on the album as "Dave's Possessed Hair/It's What We're All About".

In October 2002, the band went on a month long tour called the Sum on Your Face Tour. On November 26, 2002, the group released its second album, Does This Look Infected? The special edition came with a DVD, Cross The T's and Gouge Your I's. Whibley said of the album: "We don't want to make another record that sounds like the last record, I hate when bands repeat albums." The album featured a harder and edgier sound, and the lyrics featured a more serious outlook. The album peaked at number 32 on the Billboard 200 chart and at number eight on the Top Canadian Albums chart. It was certified Platinum in Canada and gold in the United States.

The first single released from the album was "Still Waiting", which peaked at number seven on the Modern Rock Tracks chart. The second single, "The Hell Song" peaked at number 13 on the chart. "The Hell Song"'s music video depicted the band members using dolls with their pictures on them and others, such as Korn, Kiss, AC/DC, Snoop Dogg, Destiny's Child, Ozzy Osbourne, Sharon Osbourne, and Pamela Anderson. The third single, "Over My Head (Better Off Dead)", had a video released exclusively in Canada and on the band's website, featuring live shots of the band. The video also appeared on the group's live DVD, Sake Bombs and Happy Endings (2003), as a bonus feature. The band again began a long tour to promote the album before recording the group's third studio album.

=== 2004–2005: Chuck ===
In late May 2004, the band travelled to the Democratic Republic of the Congo with War Child Canada, a branch of the British charity organization War Child, to document the effects of the country's civil war. There had been a stoppage in fighting for almost a year and a half, yet days after arriving, fighting broke out in Bukavu near the hotel where the band was staying. The band waited for the fighting to die down, but it did not. A UN peacekeeper, Charles "Chuck" Pelletier, called for armoured carriers to take the hotel's occupants out of the hot zone. After nearly twenty hours, the carriers arrived, and the band and forty other civilians were taken to safety.

"We're All to Blame"
Sample of "We're All to Blame" from Chuck. "We're All to Blame" features a thrash metal sound.

In honour of Pelletier, Sum 41 named its next album Chuck; it was released on October 12, 2004. The album charted at number 10 on the Billboard 200 chart. It also peaked at number two on the Canadian Albums chart. The album received positive reviews, and was certified Platinum in Canada and gold in the United States.

The first single from the album was "We're All To Blame", which peaked at number 10 on the Alternative Airplay chart. It was followed by "Pieces", which reached the top of the charts in Canada. In 2004, the band went on a co-headlining North American Tour with Good Charlotte. The band joined Mötley Crüe on their Carnival of Sin summer tour as an opening act.

A documentary of the band's experience in Congo was made into a film called Rocked: Sum 41 in Congo and later aired on MTV. War Child released it on DVD on November 29, 2005, in the United States and Canada. Following the album's release, the band went on a tour with Good Charlotte until 2006. On December 21, 2005, Sum 41 released a live album, Happy Live Surprise, in Japan. The CD contained a full concert recorded live in London, Ontario. The same CD was released March 7, 2006, in Canada under the name Go Chuck Yourself. The band played videos before its set that were deemed "unsuitable for children". Controversy arose over some of the videos' violent content.

=== 2006–2008: Baksh's departure and Underclass Hero ===
On May 10, 2006, Dave Baksh, via a statement through management, announced that he was leaving Sum 41 to work with his new band, Brown Brigade, which has a more "classic metal" sound. Baksh cited "creative differences" as the reason for his departure, but claimed that he was still on good terms with the band. The next day, Whibley confirmed Baksh's official departure and announced that the band would only replace him with a touring guitarist, who would not have any decision-making power in the band or be in videos, photo shoots, or albums. The band hired Gob frontman and guitarist Tom Thacker to replace Baksh.

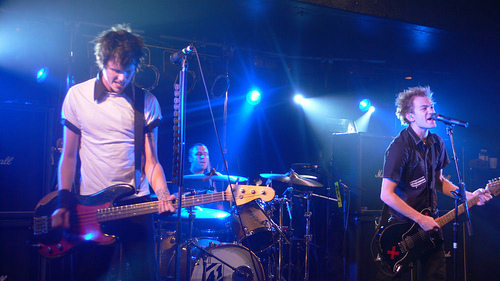
Sum 41 playing live at Club Oxygen on March 7, 2008

On April 17, 2007, the band released a song on iTunes, "March of the Dogs". Whibley was threatened with deportation from the United States for the song, because he metaphorically "killed the president" on it. The band's fourth studio album, Underclass Hero was released on July 23, 2007.

The album, backed by the first single and title track, "Underclass Hero", was released on July 24, 2007. Despite mixed reviews, the album was a commercial success, debuting at number seven on the Billboard 200 and at number one on the Billboard Rock Albums chart, the band's highest US chart position to date. It also peaked at number one on the Canadian Albums chart and on the Alternative Albums chart. Two more singles were released from the album, "Walking Disaster" and "With Me". Underclass Hero was certified Platinum in Canada. On September 15, 2007, the band headlined the House of Blues with Yellowcard.

In October 2007, the band began the Strength in Numbers Tour, a tour of Canada with Canadian band Finger Eleven; Die Mannequin opened each of Sum 41's shows. During the tour, Whibley sustained a herniated disk. As a result, the group cancelled the rest of its shows. After Whibley recovered from his injury, the band continued the Underclass Hero tour in March 2008 and toured until early July, when the group began preparation for its next album.

Sum 41 released a greatest hits album in Japan titled 8 Years of Blood, Sake and Tears in November 2008. The album included a previously unreleased song, "Always", and a DVD, which contains each of the band's music videos. On March 17, the band released the worldwide version of the album, titled All the Good Shit.

=== 2009–2012: Thacker's official arrival and Screaming Bloody Murder ===
In July 2009, the band was an opening act for The Offspring on their Shit is Fucked Up Tour. Drummer Steve Jocz confirmed that Tom Thacker was now an official member of Sum 41, and would take part in the writing and recording. On November 5, 2009, Whibley posted a blog on the band's MySpace page announcing Gil Norton as the producer of the band's upcoming album, also saying that 20 songs were already written for the album. In an interview with Tom Thacker, some working titles for songs for the new album were confirmed, including "Panic Attack", "Jessica Kill" and "Like Everyone Else". Pre-production for the new album took 13 days in December 2009, with the band officially entering the studio to begin recording at Perfect Sound Studios on January 26, 2010. The new studio album, was titled Screaming Bloody Murder. A new song called "Skumfuk" was leaked online on July 6, 2010. From October to November 2010, the band headlined the Eastpak Antidote Tour.

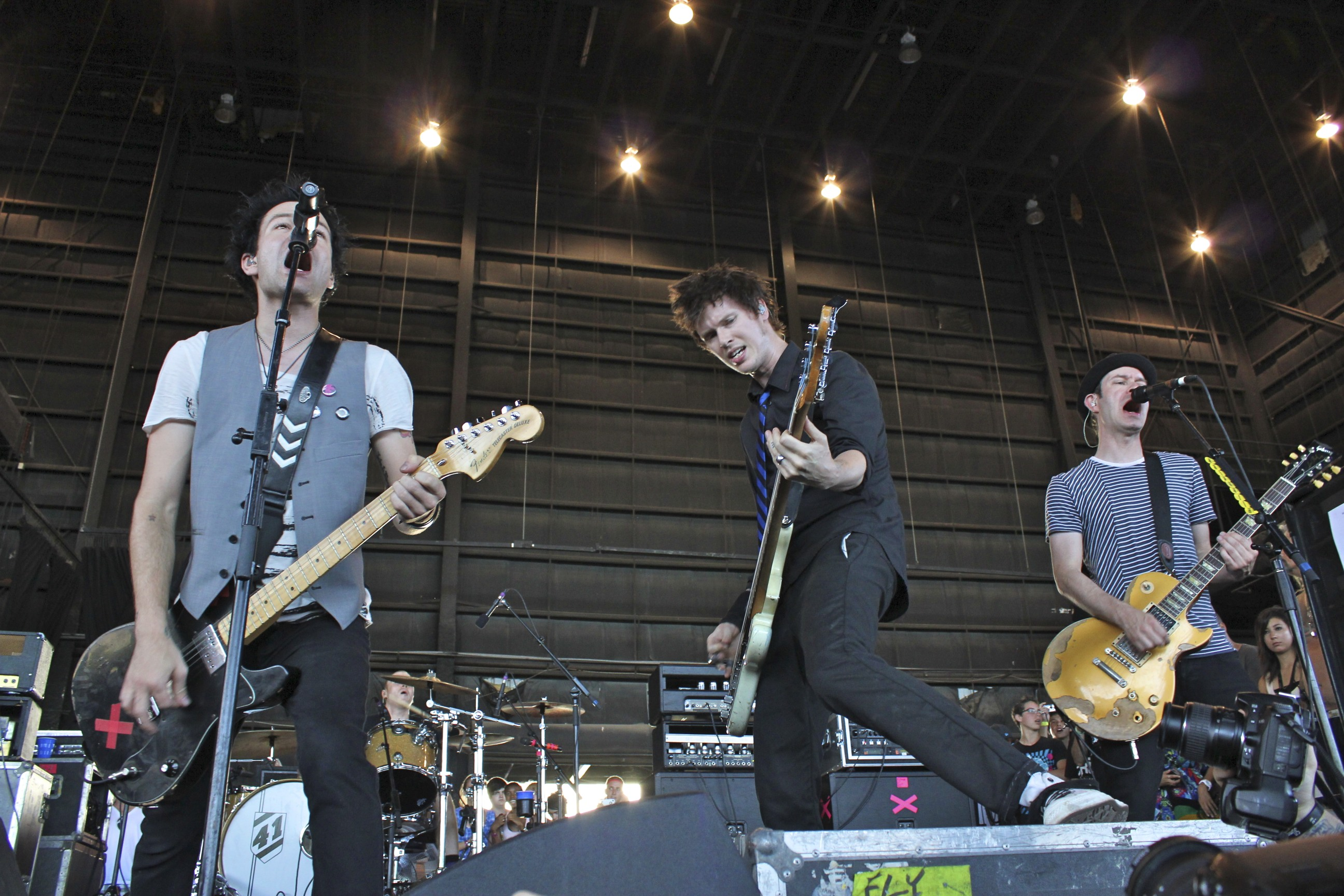
Sum 41 performing on Vans Warped Tour in 2010.

The first single from the album, "Screaming Bloody Murder", was released on February 7, 2011, in the United States. On February 28, 2011, a stream of "Blood in My Eyes", another new song from the album, was released for free listening on Alternative Press. The album Screaming Bloody Murder was released on March 29, 2011. On May 28, 2011, Sum 41 performed a live set for Guitar Center Sessions on DirecTV. The episode included an interview with program host Nic Harcourt.

"Baby You Don't Wanna Know" was released as the album's second single. A music video was also produced for the first single, "Screaming Bloody Murder", but it was left unreleased due to its content and difficulties with executives of the band.

On August 9, 2011, Sum 41 released the live album Live at the House of Blues, Cleveland 9.15.07 – a live recording of a show that took place on September 15, 2007, in Cleveland, Ohio, while the band was touring its previous album Underclass Hero. A week later when the band was touring the US as part of the Vans Warped Tour, they were forced once again to cancel all remaining dates, when Whibley re-injured his back after playing three shows. It was announced on the band's official website that they would be postponing indefinitely all upcoming tour dates for 2011 while Whibley underwent treatment. In 2011, Sum 41 was nominated for a Grammy Award for Best Hard Rock/Metal Performance for the song "Blood in My Eyes", but lost to the Foo Fighters.

In February 2012, the band shot a music video for the song "Blood in My Eyes", the third single from the album, with director Michael Maxxis in Los Angeles. It was released officially released on September 10, 2012.

From November to December 2012, the band undertook the Does This Look Infected? 10th Anniversary Tour, touring the United States to celebrate the album's release in 2002.

=== 2013–2018: Continued lineup changes and 13 Voices ===
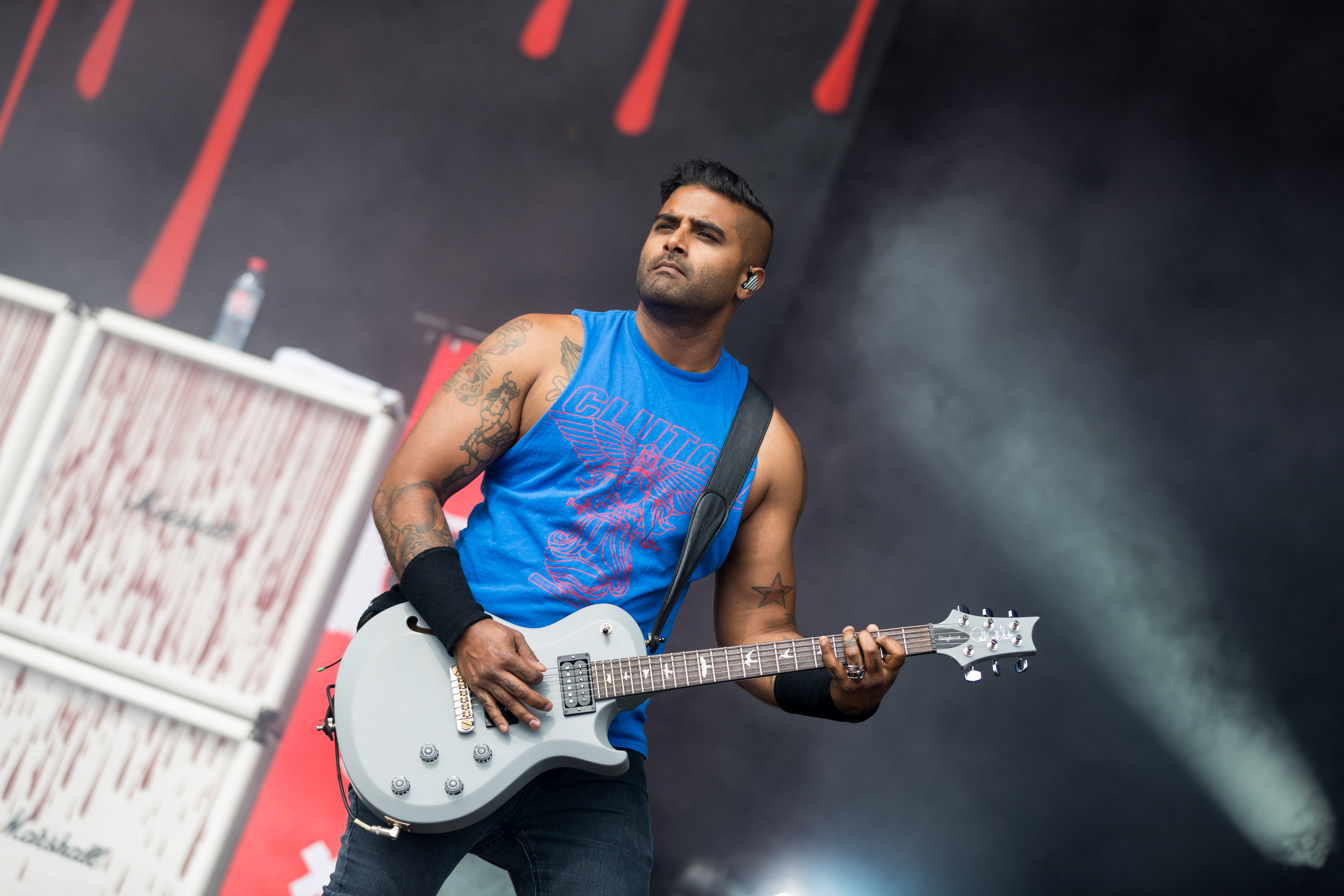
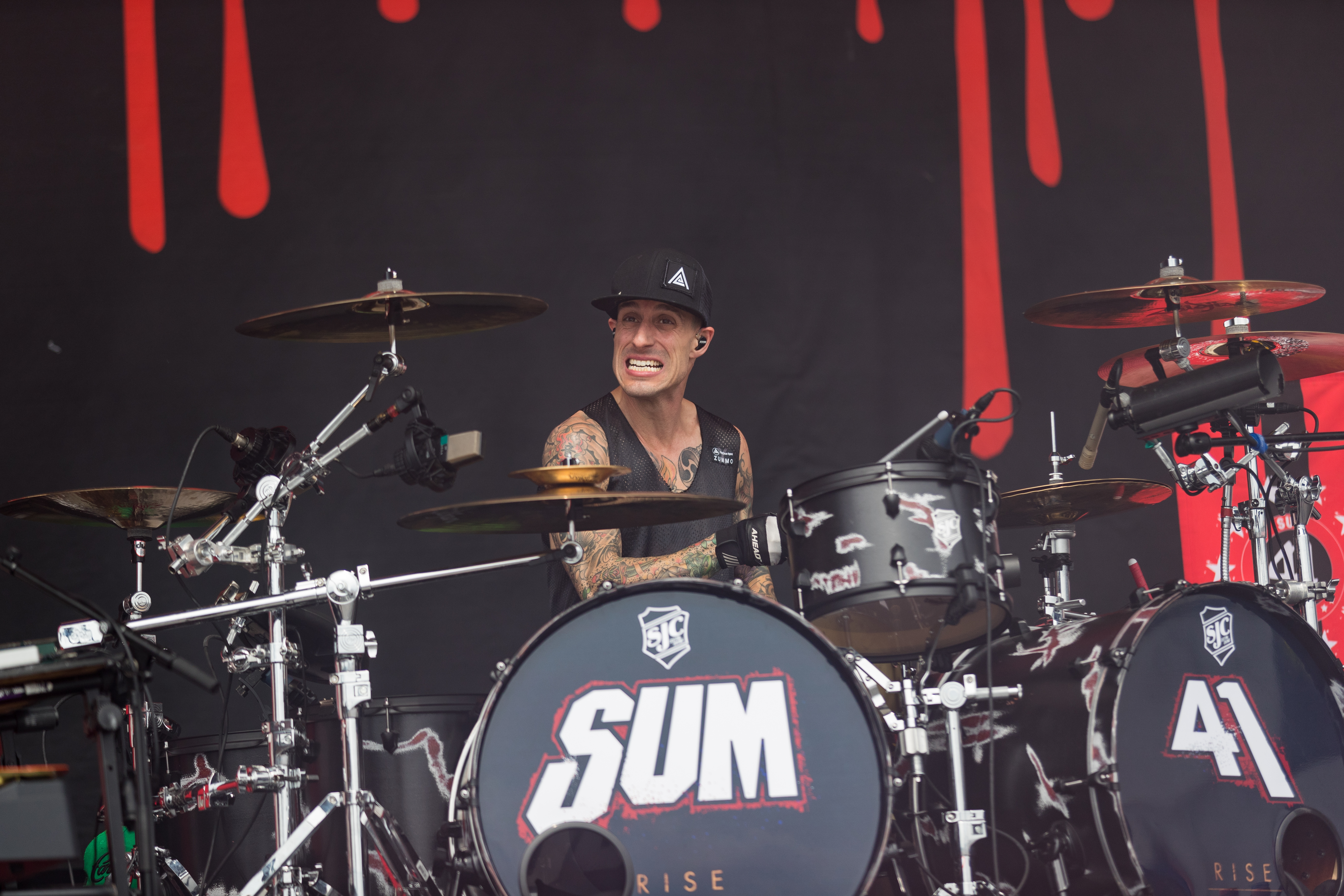
In 2015, Dave Baksh (top) rejoined Sum 41, while Frank Zummo (bottom) was recruited as the band's new drummer.

From March to April 2013, the band co-headlined the Dead Silence Tour with Billy Talent. On April 18, 2013, drummer Jocz announced he would be leaving the band on his official Facebook page, leaving Whibley as the sole founding member of the band.

On May 16, 2014, Deryck Whibley posted on his website, explaining that he had liver and kidney failure due to excessive drinking. He also said he had some ideas for new songs and that the band would soon start making a new album. On June 9, 2014, Whibley said on his Facebook page that he was working on new Sum 41 music out of his home studio to get ready to record some new tunes.

On July 9, 2015, the band launched a PledgeMusic campaign for its comeback album. On July 23, 2015, the band played its comeback show at the Alternative Press Awards, which featured former lead guitarist Dave Baksh, joining the band on stage nine years after his departure. The band's set also featured DMC as guest. It also introduced Frank Zummo from Street Drum Corps as the new drummer. Sum 41 confirmed Baksh's official return to the band on August 14, 2015. On December 26, 2015, Sum 41 teased two new songs on their Instagram profile.

The band performed on the 2016 Warped Tour. On May 11, 2016, the group announced its signing to Hopeless Records. The band announced on June 6, 2016, that their sixth album would be called 13 Voices and would be released on October 7, 2016. That same day, they also revealed album's track list and cover art. The first song from the upcoming album, "Fake My Own Death", was released on June 28, 2016, through Hopeless Records' official YouTube channel, along with a music video for the song. The song was performed on The Late Show with Stephen Colbert on October 3, 2016. The album's first official single, "War", was released on August 25, 2016. On September 29, 2016, the track "God Save Us All (Death to Pop)" was officially released (along with a live music video). IMPALA awarded the album with a double gold award for 150,000 sold copies across Europe.

On September 29, 2016, it was announced that the band would be headlining the 2016 Kerrang! Tour. From October 2016 to August 2017, the band went on their Don't Call It a Sum-Back Tour in support of 13 Voices. The band played nearly 100 shows in the Americas, Europe, and Asia. The band invited fans to record a music video for "Goddamn I'm Dead Again" that was released on May 3, 2017. In April 2017, the band co-headlined the 2017 Canadian Tour with Papa Roach. From April to May 2017, the band co-headlined the We Will Detonate Tour with Pierce the Veil. The group embarked on a 15th anniversary tour of Does This Look Infected in 2018.

=== 2019–2021: Order in Decline ===
From April to May 2019, the band embarked on an intimate tour called the No Personal Space Tour. In April 2019, the band announced via social media its return with new music. On April 24, 2019, they released the single, "Out for Blood" through Hopeless Records. The same day, the band also announced their seventh studio album, Order in Decline, with a set release date of July 19, 2019.

The second single from the album "A Death in the Family" was released along with a music video on June 11, 2019. On June 18, 2019, "Never There" was released as the third single, along with a video. On July 8, 2019, the band released "45 (A Matter of Time)" as the fourth single, along with a video. On July 18, 2019, the band performed a medley of Metallica songs including "For Whom The Bell Tolls", "Enter Sandman", and "Master Of Puppets" at SiriusXM studios.

In September 2019, the band started a North American tour called the Order in Decline Tour. On top of supporting Order in Decline, the tour was also done in support of the 15th Anniversary of their studio album Chuck. From November to December 2019, the band went on a co-headlining tour with The Offspring. On May 28, 2021, the band released a version of "Catching Fire" featuring Nothing,Nowhere, along with a music video.

=== 2022–2025: Heaven :x: Hell, final tour, Canadian Music Hall of Fame induction, and disbandment ===
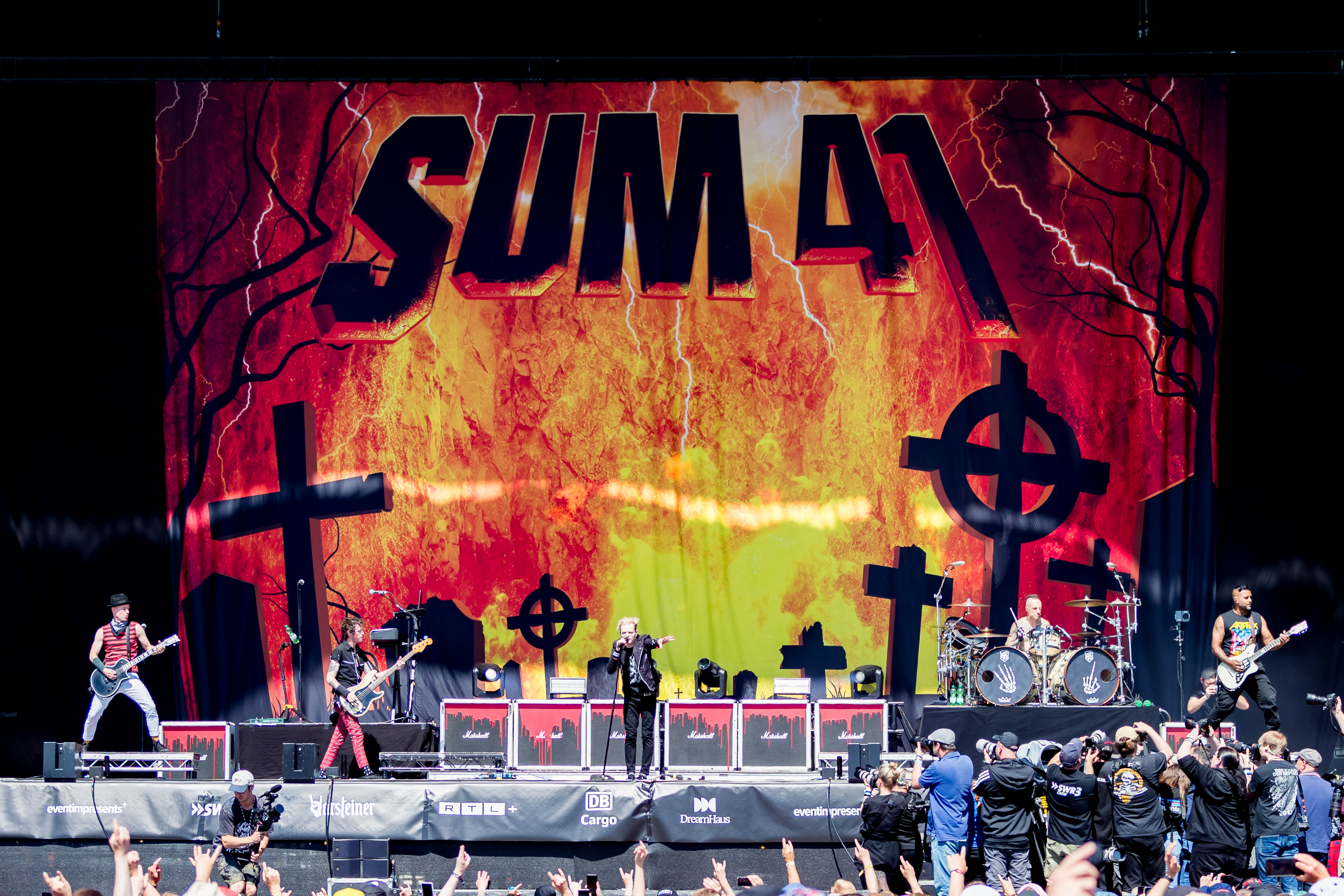
Sum 41 performing at Rock im Park in 2023

On February 22, 2022, the band announced a U.S. tour with Simple Plan called the Blame Canada tour that ran from April to August 2022.

On March 23, 2022, the band announced their eighth studio album, Heaven :x: Hell, a double album. Heaven will return to the pop punk sound of the band's early career while Hell is a continuation of the band's more recent heavier metal sound.

On October 8, 2022, during their Does This Look All Killer No Filler Tour, Sum 41 performed at the Unipol Arena in Bologna, Italy, drawing over 14,000 attendees, the band's largest concert ever held in Europe.

On February 22, 2023, it was announced that the band would be playing at When We Were Young on October 22, 2023. On May 8, 2023, the band announced it would be disbanding following the release of Heaven :x: Hell and a worldwide headlining tour.

In September 2023, it was announced that Whibley was hospitalized for COVID-19, and pneumonia. The next day, it was announced that he was responding well to his treatments and was discharged from the hospital. Despite being discharged from the hospital, Whibley stated that he was "not out of the woods yet" but is "staying positive". On September 24, the band launched a Laylo website, hinting fans that "Something is coming..."

The first single of the album, titled "Landmines", was released on September 27, 2023, along with a music video. The song is a return to the pop-punk sound of the band's early career, making it part of the Heaven side of the album. The band also announced that they signed with Rise Records. The second single, "Rise Up", was released on December 12, 2023, along with a music video. The song is in the style of the band's more recent heavier metal sound, meaning it will be part of the Hell side on the upcoming album. The album was released on March 29, 2024.

On January 16, 2024, the band announced dates for their final tour, with their last show taking place on January 30, 2025, at Scotiabank Arena in Toronto. The band played "Landmines" on Jimmy Kimmel Live! on February 8, 2024. On February 22, 2024, the band released "Waiting on a Twist of Fate" as the album's third single. A music video for "Dopamine" was released on March 29, 2024, the same day as the album.

In 2024, there were rumours that Whibley would replace late Linkin Park vocalist Chester Bennington following his suicide in 2017. However, in August 2024, Whibley himself dispelled these rumours.

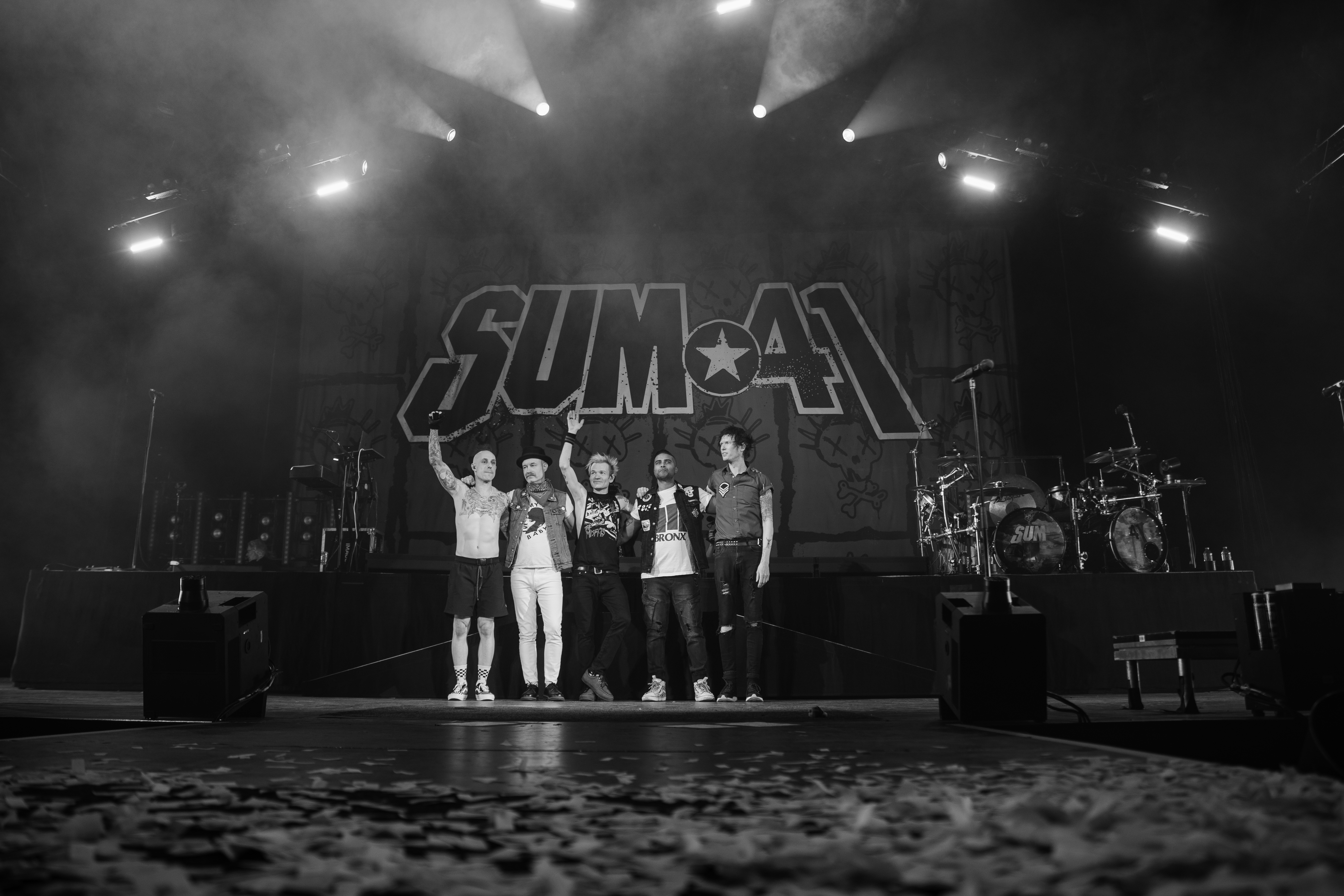
Sum 41 following their final live performance in Toronto on January 30, 2025.

In a 2025 interview with The Canadian Press for Sum 41's final Canadian tour dates, McCaslin and Baksh said they learned of the group's disbandment through an email sent by Whibley to all of the members in early 2023. Both said they were shocked and it took each of them speaking directly with Whibley by phone to understand the decision. Whibley described years of finding excuses to keep Sum 41 together and only reaching certainty on his decision to break up the band after returning to a tour life after the COVID-19 pandemic closures.

On March 28, 2025, the band released a cover of "Sleep Now in the Fire" by Rage Against the Machine. The band was inducted into the Canadian Music Hall of Fame on March 30, 2025, during the 54th annual Juno Awards. Founding drummer Steve Jocz was also inducted but did not attend the ceremony. After the induction, the band released their final music video for the song "Radio Silence" on April 1, 2025.

The band's agent Dave Shapiro was killed in a plane crash in San Diego on May 22, 2025, along with former The Devil Wears Prada drummer Daniel Williams.

=== 2025–present: Post-disbandment releases ===
In November 2025, Whibley revealed that he had completed recording an album of acoustic versions of Sum 41 songs and expressed interest in undertaking an acoustic tour. In November 2026, retail listings revealed the album's title, Diamonds of the Night: Vol. 1, and a scheduled release date of March 19, 2027. Credited to both Sum 41 and Whibley, the album consists of twelve acoustic reinterpretations of songs from the band's discography.

== Side projects and collaborations ==
Before the release of Half Hour of Power, and up until the departures of Dave Baksh and Steve Jocz, Sum 41 occasionally played as an alter ego 1980s heavy metal band called Pain for Pleasure during shows. The band appeared in Sum 41's music videos for "Fat Lip" and "We're All to Blame" and had at least one song on each of the band's first three releases. The group's best known song under the Pain for Pleasure moniker is the song of the same name from All Killer No Filler, a track that remains the band's staple during live shows and features drummer Steve Jocz on lead vocals. During the Don't Call It a Sum-Back Tour in 2017, Pain for Pleasure appeared performing the song at the end of their show with guitarist Tom Thacker replacing Jocz as the vocalist.

Sum 41 has collaborated with many other artists, both live and in the studio, including: MC Shan, Tenacious D, Ludacris, Iggy Pop, Pennywise, Bowling for Soup, Unwritten Law, Mike Shinoda, Treble Charger, Gob, Tommy Lee, Rob Halford, Kerry King, Metallica, Ja Rule, DMC, and Nothing,Nowhere.

Shortly after touring for Does This Look Infected?, Sum 41 was recruited by Iggy Pop for his album, Skull Ring. Whibley co-wrote the first single from the album, "Little Know It All", and joined Iggy on the Late Show with David Letterman to promote it. Following the band's show of September 11, 2005, in Quebec City, Quebec, the band went on a touring hiatus, although on April 17, 2006, Sum 41 played at a tribute to Iggy Pop, joining Iggy on stage for "Little Know It All" and "Lust For Life".

During the band's 2006 touring hiatus, Whibley focused on his producing career: he produced two songs for Avril Lavigne's album The Best Damn Thing. Jocz recorded his first video as director for a Canadian band, The Midway State, and McCaslin started a side project with Todd Morse of H_{2}O and Juliette and the Licks. McCaslin's two-person band, named The Operation M.D., released its debut album, We Have an Emergency, in early 2007. In 2022, Whibley was featured on the Simple Plan single, "Ruin My Life".

== Musical style and influences ==
"Fat Lip"
Sample of "Fat Lip" from All Killer No Filler. "Fat Lip" has been described as pop-punk, much like the band's other material. Unlike the band's other material, the song contains rapping during the verses.

Sum 41 has been categorized as pop-punk, skate punk, punk rock, heavy metal, alternative metal, melodic hardcore, alternative rock, pop rock, punk metal, arena rock, and hard rock. (Note: Musical styles: "pop-punk"; "skate punk"; "punk rock"; "heavy metal"; "alternative metal"; "melodic hardcore"; "alternative rock"; "pop rock"; "punk metal"; "arena rock"; "hard rock") Writers for CBC Music stated that the band's recorded catalogue ranges from "rambunctious anthems to emotional slow jams." Johnny Loftus of AllMusic described the band's sound as employing "mighty guitars and a manic rhythm section." The band has released tracks with heavy metal sensibilities on every album throughout its career, employing screamed vocals, palm-muting, and shred guitar solos. Other tracks incorporate double bass drumming and chugged guitar riffs, drawing comparisons to metalcore. Revolver wrote: "Simply put, Sum 41 are real-deal metalheads." Loudwire stated that the band's fusion of styles has earned them fans outside the pop-punk genre.

In a November 2004 interview, Deryck Whibley said: "We don't even consider ourselves punk. We're just a rock band. We want to do something different. We want to do our own thing. That's how music has always been to us." Dave Baksh reiterated Whibley's claims, stating "We just call ourselves rock... It's easier to say than punk, especially around all these fuckin' kids that think they know what punk is. Something that was based on not having any rules has probably one of the strictest fucking rule books in the world."

Sum 41's musical style has consistently changed between albums. The band's EP Half Hour of Power is described as pop-punk and skate punk. All Killer No Filler has been described as fusing "arena-sized riffing, hip-hop poses, and crass humor," and was also categorized as pop-punk and skate punk (except for "Pain for Pleasure", which is purely heavy metal). Loftus stated that after the band's debut, their "mischievous pop-punk style was steadily hardened with darker, world-weary lyrics and a heavier, metal-inspired attack." Does This Look Infected? has been described as punk rock, pop-punk melodic hardcore, horror punk, and heavy metal. Revolver stated that the band's sound became "the band’s sound got edgier, darker and more cynical" during this time.

Chuck moved into a sound influenced by heavy metal and hardcore punk, and has been categorised by critics as alternative metal, thrash metal and melodic hardcore. Underclass Hero was as a revival of the band's pop-punk style, however differentiated itself from their early work through its heavy use of acoustic guitars, complex vocal harmonies, pianos and organs. Screaming Bloody Murder saw the band turn in a much darker direction. Sonically it was a return to metal, while also incorporating elements of garage rock and, on some songs, progressive rock. 13 Voices and Order in Decline saw the band continue in this heavier direction, incorporating elements of hardcore punk, metalcore and thrash metal. Their final album, Heaven :x: Hell, is a double album which features both a return to the pop-punk sound of the band's early career, and a continuation of the band's later heavy metal sound. This album was also described as skate punk, alternative rock, and alternative metal.

Some of the band's songs contain political-social commentary; "Still Waiting" is an anti-George W. Bush and anti-Iraq War song, "The Jester" and "March of the Dogs" also are critical of Bush, "45 (A Matter of Time)" is critical of U.S. president Donald Trump, "Underclass Hero" is a song about class struggle, and "Dear Father" and "Never There" are about Whibley's absent father.

Sum 41's influences include Weezer, Slayer, the Police, Devo, Megadeth, Pennywise, Refused, Rancid, No Use for a Name, the Vandals, Anthrax, Carcass, Dio, Judas Priest, Foo Fighters, Green Day, NOFX, Lagwagon, Face to Face, Nirvana, the Beatles (including John Lennon's solo work), Elvis Costello, Beastie Boys, Run–D.M.C., Rob Base and DJ E-Z Rock, Metallica, Guns N' Roses, and Iron Maiden. (Note: Influenced by: Weezer, Slayer, the Police, Devo, Megadeth, Pennywise, Refused, Rancid, No Use for a Name, the Vandals, Anthrax, Carcass, Dio, Judas Priest, Foo Fighters, Green Day, NOFX, Lagwagon, Face to Face, Nirvana, the Beatles (including John Lennon's solo work), Elvis Costello, Beastie Boys, Run–D.M.C., Rob Base and DJ E-Z Rock, Metallica, Guns N' Roses, Iron Maiden,)

== Reception and legacy ==
Sum 41 is considered to be one of the most influential rock bands to have formed out of Canada; from their formation to 2016, they were the 31st best-selling Canadian artist in the country. Several publications have noted their impact on punk rock and on popular music in general. In 2025, Cult MTL wrote: "Sum 41 has shaped the landscape of punk music, inspiring countless artists and fans. Their journey from local garage band to global rock icons is a testament to their talent, resilience, and dedication to their craft. [...] Sum 41’s music became the soundtrack of a generation, capturing the angst, rebellion, and energy of the early 2000s. Their songs remain anthems for fans who grew up with their music." Sum 41 came fourth in a reader's poll of "5 bands that should reunite in 2025" held by Alternative Press, where staff writer Timothy Norris noted the band were "already sorely missed" by the site's readers. That same year, Radio X listed the band fourth on its list of "The all-time greatest Pop-Punk bands", where the site's staff wrote: "'In Too Deep' [...] soundtracked every fifteen year old's summer in 2001. The Canadian four piece slid in perfectly to that whole American Pie scene; obnoxious, crude, and (kind of) funny. Self-deprecating genius."

The band's songs and albums routinely appear in "best of" lists for the pop-punk genre compiled by various publications. The staff of Consequence ranked the band at number 75 on their list of "The 100 Best Pop Punk Bands" in 2019. Staff writer Zak Ruskins referred to them as "one of the Great White North’s most memorably snotty exports."

Not all reactions to the band's music were positive. In 2013, Angelica Leicht of Houston Press wrote: "These guys were not punk, not rock, and not even good. They were just generic and boring at their very, very best, and they were whiny as all hell at their worst. Remember 'In Too Deep' or 'Fat Lip'? Neither does anyone else, because it was the type of music you desperately tried to rid your eardrums of once it infiltrated them." Additionally, Noel Gallager of English rock band Oasis publicly bashed Sum 41's music. He is quoted by Columbus Monthly as follows: "Do you ever look at the sky and think, I’m glad I’m alive? After I heard Sum 41, I thought, I’m actually alive to hear the shittiest band of all time, which is quite something when you think about it. Of all the bands that have gone before and all the bands that’ll be in the future, I was around when the worst was around." Despite this, Whibley reportedly attended an Oasis concert in 2025 and praised their performance.

Sum 41 has inspired modern artists such as 5 Seconds of Summer, Seaway, Dune Rats, Marshmello, PVRIS, Trash Boat, Neck Deep, the Vamps, Bully, Waterparks, Roam, the White Noise and Modern Error. (Note: Influenced: 5 Seconds of Summer, Seaway, Dune Rats, Marshmello, PVRIS, Trash Boat, Neck Deep, the Vamps, Bully, Waterparks, Roam, Modern Error; The White Noise)

== Band members ==
Sum 41 live at Southside Festival 2024

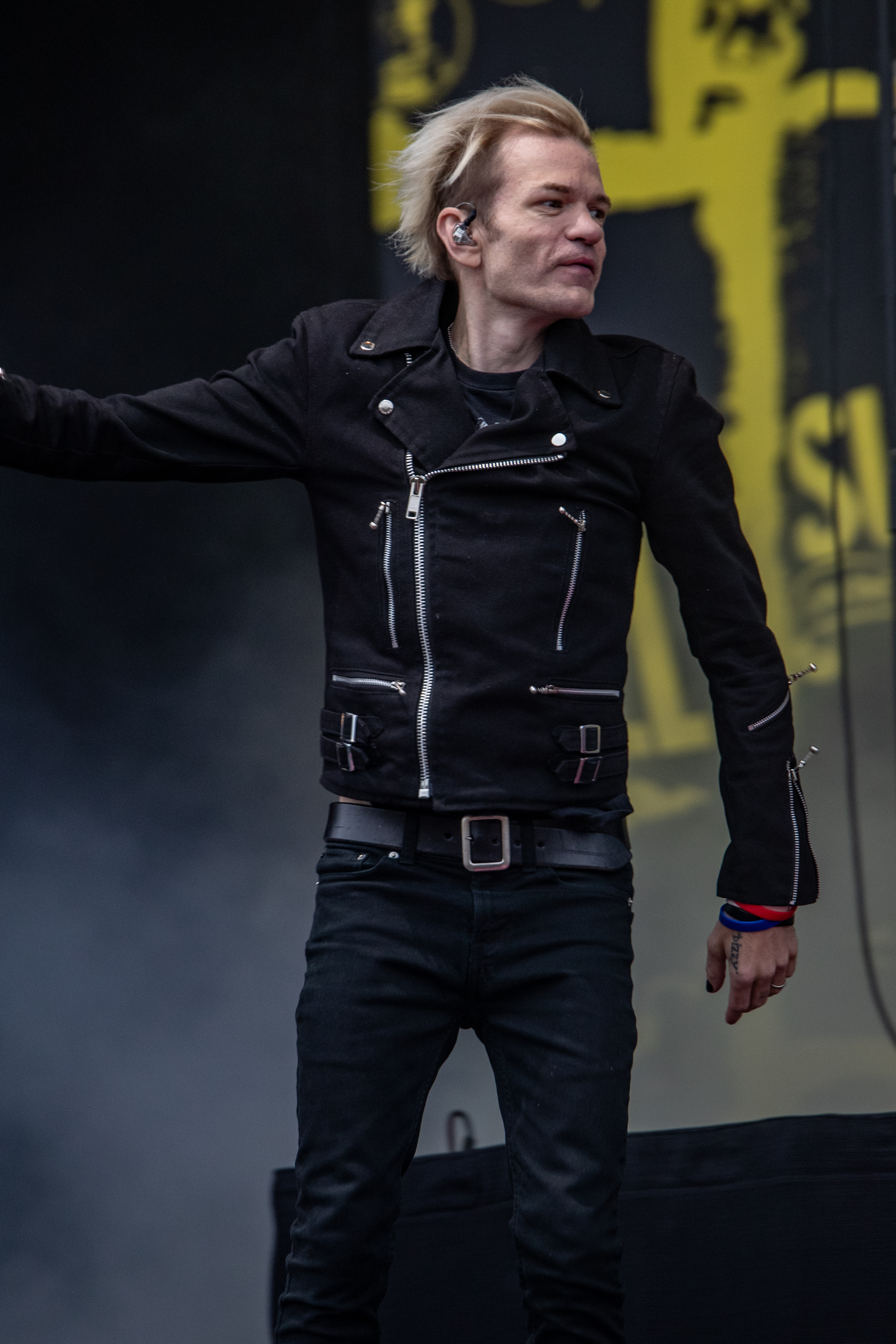
Deryck Whibley

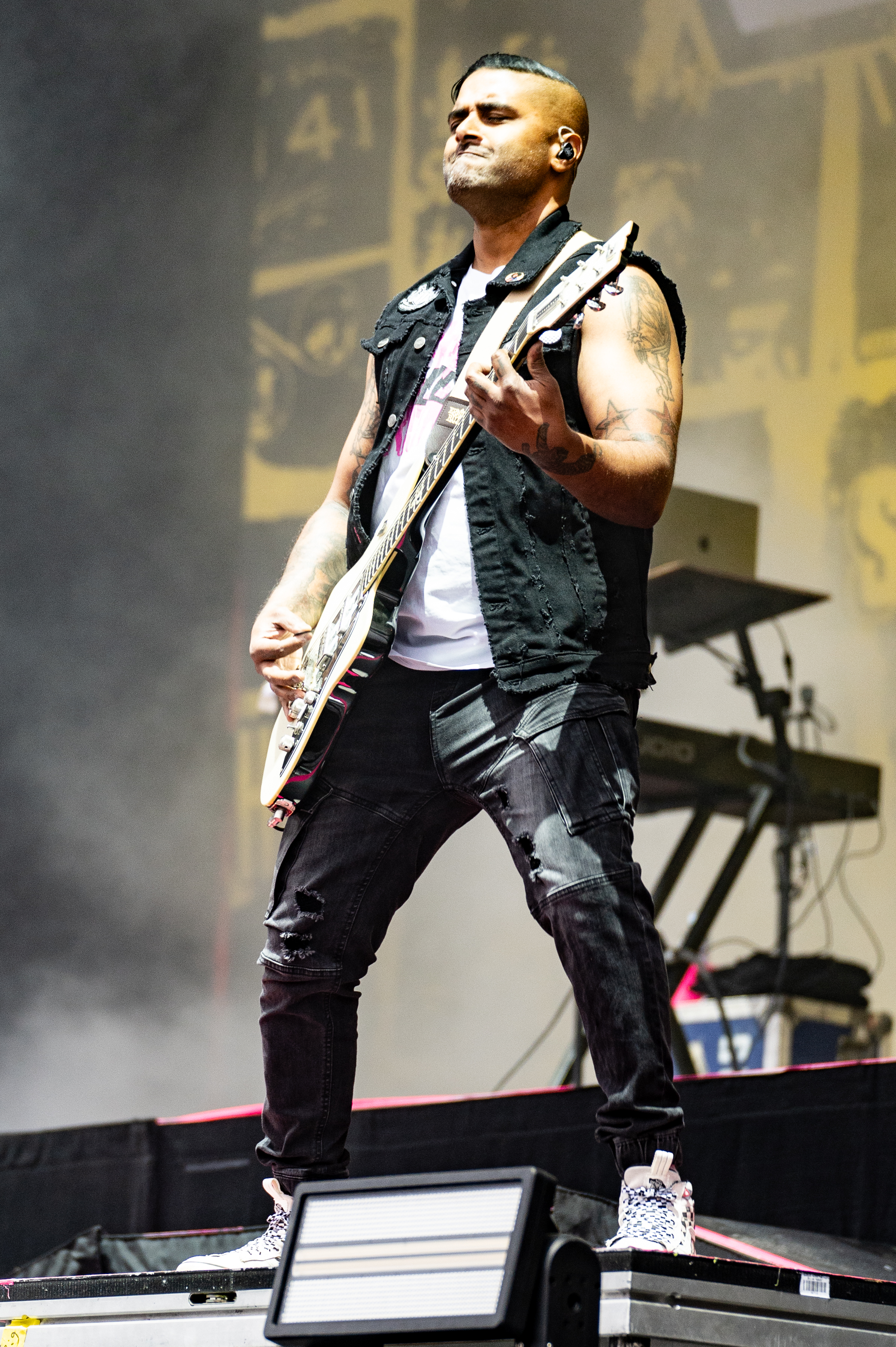
Dave "Brownsound" Baksh

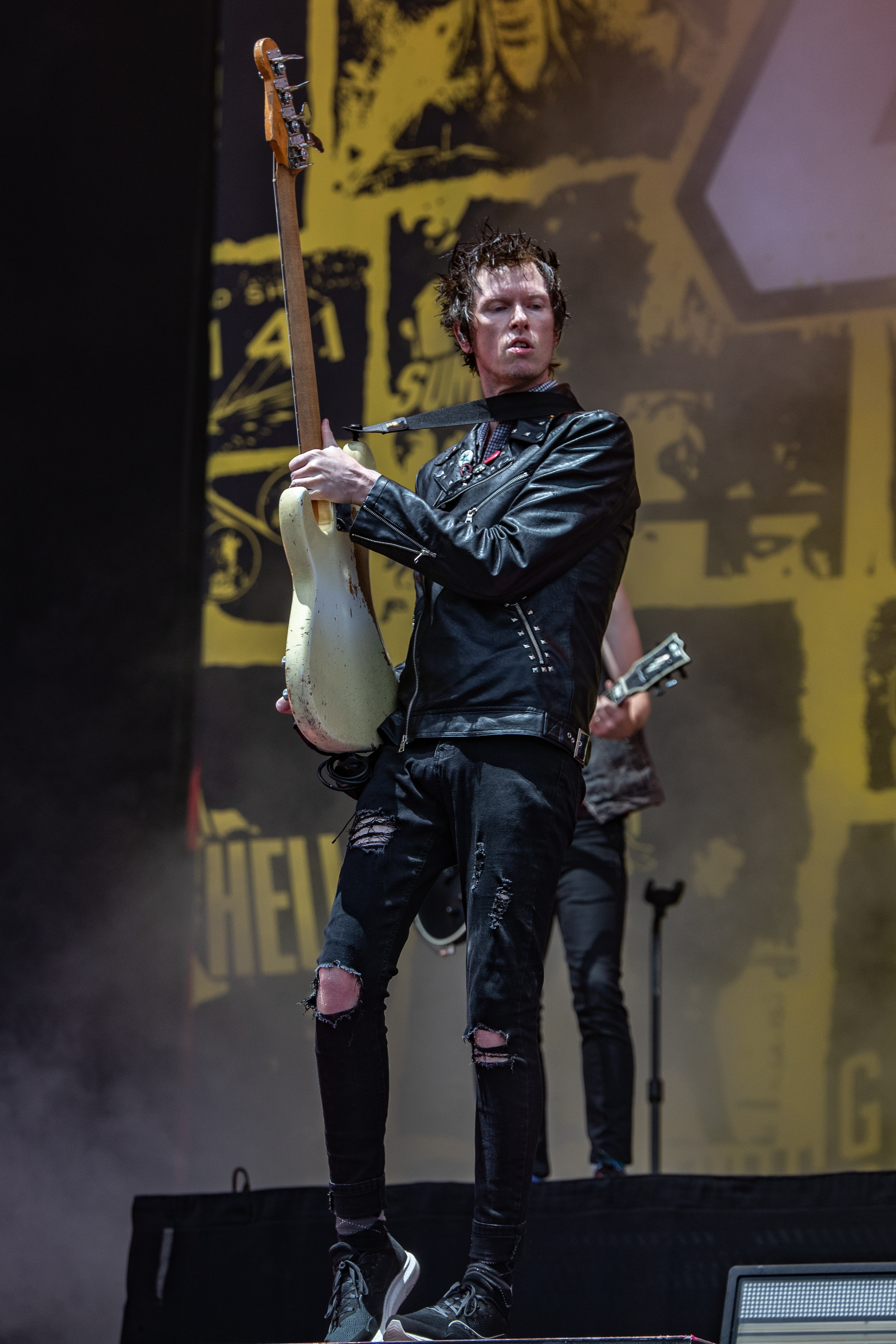
Jason "Cone" McCaslin

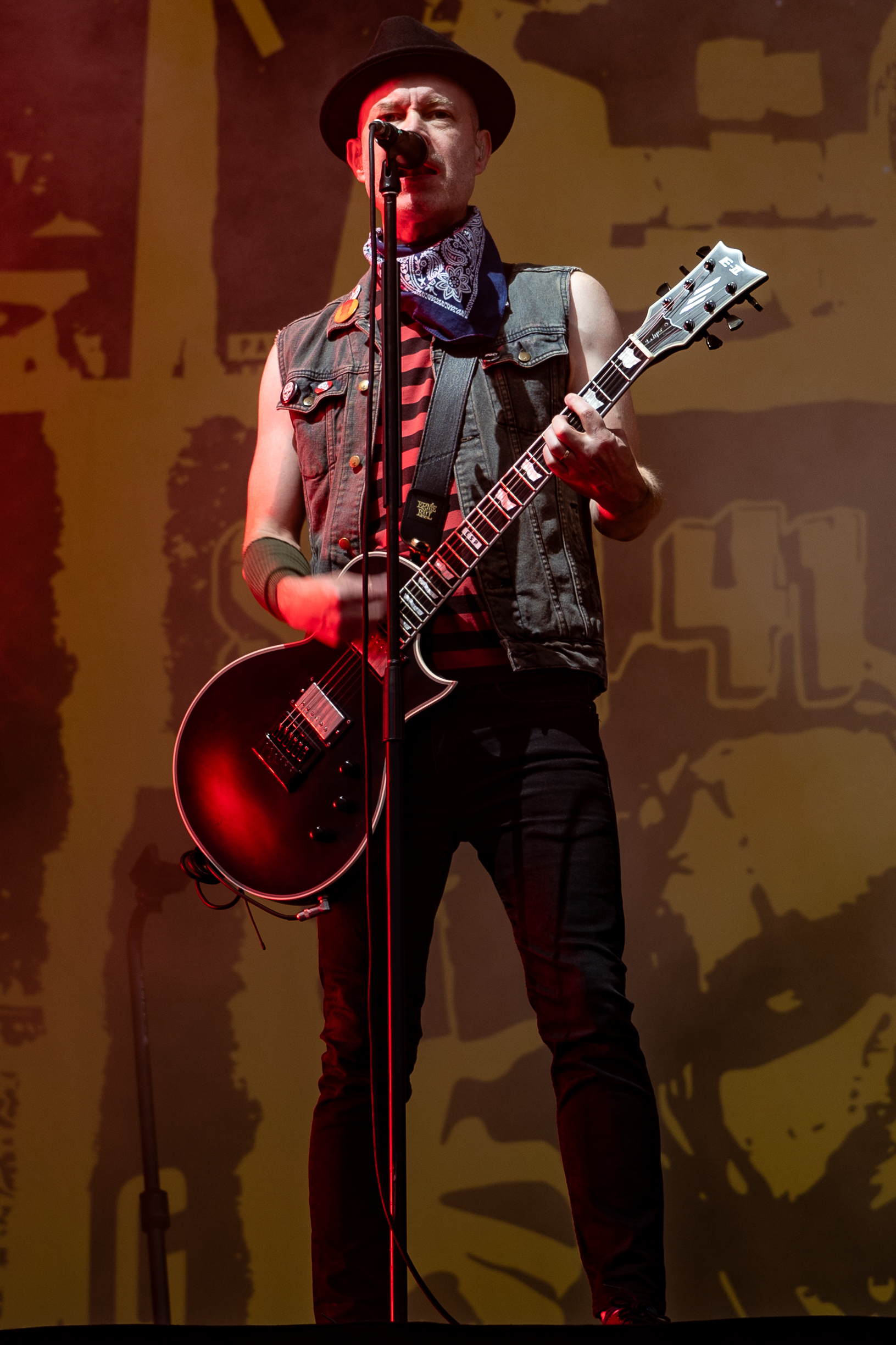
Tom Thacker

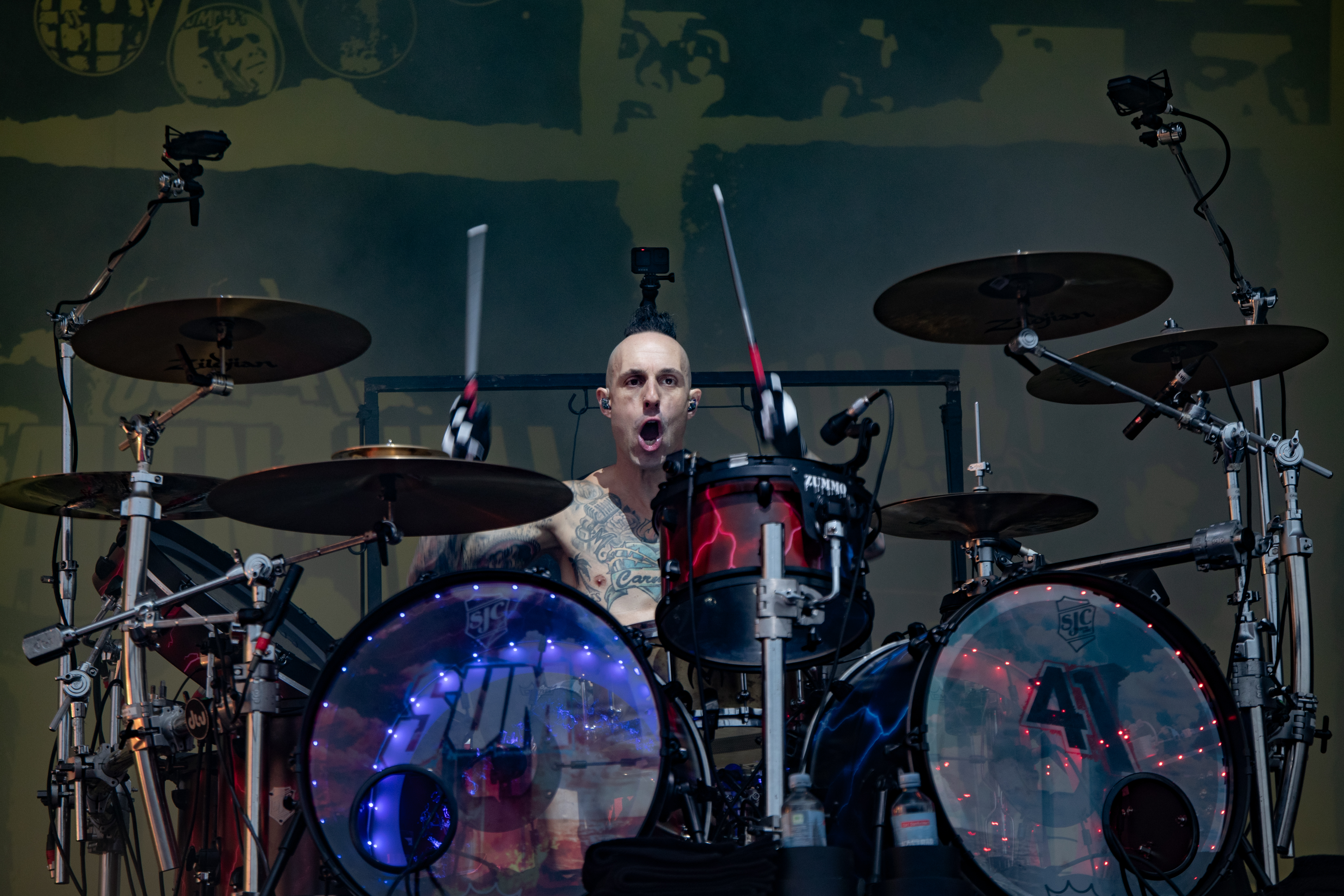
Frank Zummo

Final lineup

- Deryck Whibley – lead vocals, rhythm guitar (1997–2025), keyboards (2004–2025), lead guitar (1996–1997, 2006–2009), backing vocals (1996–1997), occasional drums (2001–2013)
- Dave "Brownsound" Baksh – lead guitar, backing and occasional co-lead vocals (1997–2006; 2015–2025)
- Jason "Cone" McCaslin – bass, backing vocals (1999–2025)
- Tom Thacker – lead guitar, backing and occasional lead vocals (2009–2025; touring 2007–2009), rhythm guitar (2015–2025), keyboards (2016–2025)
- Frank Zummo – drums, backing vocals (2015–2025)

Former

- Steve "Stevo32" Jocz – drums, backing and occasional lead vocals (1996–2013)
- Jon Marshall – lead vocals, rhythm guitar (1996–1997), bass (1996)
- Grant McVittie – bass, backing vocals (1996)
- Richard "Twitch" Roy – bass, backing vocals (1996–1998)
- Mark Spicoluk – bass, backing vocals (1998–1999)

Touring

- Matt Whibley – keyboards (2011)
- Darrin Pfeiffer – drums (2015)

Timeline

== Discography ==
Studio albums

- All Killer No Filler (2001)
- Does This Look Infected? (2002)
- Chuck (2004)
- Underclass Hero (2007)
- Screaming Bloody Murder (2011)
- 13 Voices (2016)
- Order in Decline (2019)
- Heaven :x: Hell (2024)

== Tours ==
Headlining

- Tour of the Rising Sum (2001)
- Sum Like it Loud Tour (2002)
- Sum on Your Face Tour (2002–2003)
- Go Chuck Yourself Tour (2005)
- Screaming Bloody Murder Tour (2010–2013)
- Does This Look Infected?: 10th Anniversary Tour (2012)
- Don't Call It a Sum-Back Tour (2016–2017)
- Does This Look Infected?: 15th Anniversary Tour (2018)
- No Personal Space Tour (2019)
- Order In Decline Tour (2019)
- Chuck: 15th Anniversary Tour (2019)
- Tour of the Setting Sum (2024–2025)

Co-headlining

- 2004 North American Tour (with Good Charlotte) (2004)
- For One Night Only (with Yellowcard) (2007)
- Strength in Numbers Tour (with Finger Eleven) (2007)
- 2008 Australian Tour (with Pennywise) (2008)
- Dead Silence Tour (with Billy Talent) (2013)
- 2017 Canadian Tour (with Papa Roach) (2017)
- We Will Detonate Tour (with Pierce the Veil) (2017)
- 2019 Canadian Tour (with The Offspring) (2019)
- Blame Canada Tour (with Simple Plan) (2022)
- Let the Bad Times Roll Tour (with The Offspring and Simple Plan) (2023)

Travelling festival

- Warped Tour (2000–2001, 2003, 2007, 2010–2011, 2016, 2019)
- Campus Invasion Tour (2001)
- Eastpak Antidote Tour (2010)
- Kerrang! Tour (2016)

Opening act

- Conspiracy of One Tour (for The Offspring) (2001)
- Carnival of Sins Tour (for Mötley Crüe) (2005)
- Shit Is Fucked Up Tour (for The Offspring) (2009)
- One More Light World Tour (for Linkin Park) (2017)

== Awards and nominations ==
A select list of Sum 41's awards and nominations.

Year	Nominee / work	Award	Result	Ref.
2001	Sum 41	Juno Award – Best New Group	Nominated	
2001	"Makes No Difference"	MuchMusic Video Award – People's Choice: Favorite Canadian Group	Won	
2001	"Fat Lip"	MTV Video Music Award – Best New Artist in a Video	Nominated	
2002	Sum 41	Juno Award – Best Group	Nominated	
2002	All Killer No Filler	Juno Award – Best Album	Nominated	
2002	"In Too Deep"	MuchMusic Video Award – MuchLoud Best Rock Video	Won	
2003	Sum 41	Juno Award – Group of the Year	Won	
2003	Sum 41	Kerrang! Award – Best Live Act	Nominated	
2003	Sum 41	Teen Choice Award for Choice Music – Rock Group	Nominated	
2004	Does This Look Infected?	Juno Award – Rock Album of the Year	Nominated	
2004	Sum 41	Woodie Award – The Good Woodie (Greatest Social Impact)	Won	
2005	Sum 41	Juno Award – Group of the Year	Nominated	
2005	Chuck	Juno Award – Rock Album of the Year	Won	
2005	"Pieces"	MuchMusic Video Award – People's Choice: Favourite Canadian Group	Nominated	
2008	"With Me"	MuchMusic Video Award – MuchLOUD Best Rock Video	Nominated	
2008	Underclass Hero	Juno Award – Rock Album of the Year	Nominated	
2012	"Blood in My Eyes"	Grammy Award for Best Hard Rock/Metal Performance	Nominated	
2016	Sum 41	Kerrang! Award – Best Live Act	Nominated	
2016	Sum 41	Kerrang! Award – Best Fanbase	Nominated	
2017	Frank Zummo	Alternative Press Music Awards – Best Drummer	Won	
2017	"Fake My Own Death"	Alternative Press Music Awards – Best Music Video	Nominated	
2017	Sum 41	Alternative Press Music Awards – Artist of the Year	Nominated	
2020	Order in Decline	Juno Award – Rock Album of the Year	Nominated	
