= Cross the T's and Gouge Your I's =

2002 DVD by Sum 41

Cross The T's and Gouge Your I's
- Starring: Deryck Whibley; Dave Baksh; Cone McCaslin; Steve Jocz
- Distributed by: Island Records
- Release date: 2002
- Language: English

Cross the T's and Gouge Your I's is Sum 41's second DVD. It was released in 2002, as the bonus DVD for the US and UK editions of their hit album Does This Look Infected?, and as a separate DVD worldwide.

The DVD includes six sections: "Play Videos", "Reign of Pain", "Home Movies", "Pain for Pleasure Songs", "Lucifer Recommends" and "Weblink."

== Content ==
"Reign of Pain" is the story of Pain for Pleasure, the Canadian punk rock band's metal parody side project. The live footage was shot at an October 3 concert in Halifax, Nova Scotia. "It's a Pain for Pleasure documentary", explains guitarist Dave "Brownsound" Baksh, a.k.a. P4P's Pleasure, of the band that first appeared in the video for "Fat Lip", wearing wigs and spandex.

"Home Movies" features the same juvenile antics first seen on the promotional video that helped start a buzz among record labels; it tracks Sum 41 onstage, in a bathroom and robbing a pizzeria. Also included are personal bios, footage of drummer Steve "Stevo 32" Jocz's arrest, live concert footage and a Destiny's Child debate.

Three new songs can be heard in the "Pain for Pleasure" section: "Reign of Pain", "WWVII Part 1" and "WWVII Part 2". "Me and Dave think they're really funny and no one else will", Jocz says of the World War-themed tunes. "We think there's enough songs about World War III. We're just going to jump ahead a few centuries."

"Lucifer Recommends", named after the production company Sum 41's then manager Greig Nori formed with frontman Deryck Whibley, endorses new Island/Def Jam signing Autopilot Off. The Orange County band was given to Nori to produce before the label allowed him to record Sum's Does This Look Infected?. Two APO songs, "Long Way to Fall" and "Nothing Frequency", are included along with "Short Fuse" and "Ill Blood" from No Warning, a young Canadian hardcore punk band, and Lucifer's first signing.
