= Chuck (Sum 41 album) =

2004 studio album by Sum 41

Studio album by Sum 41
- Released: October 12, 2004
- Recorded: 2003–2004
- Studios: Sound City, Van Nuys, California; Ocean, Burbank, California; Reaction, Toronto, Ontario; Umbrella Sound, Toronto, Ontario; Soundtrack, New York, NY; Sidecar, North Hollywood, California
- Genres: Alternative metal; heavy metal; melodic hardcore; punk rock
- Length: 37:50
- Labels: Aquarius; Island; Mercury
- Producer: Greig Nori

Sum 41 chronology
Does This Look Infected? (2002)	Chuck (2004)	Underclass Hero (2007)

Singles from Chuck
- 1. "We're All to Blame" Released: August 31, 2004; 2. "Pieces" Released: November 15, 2004; 3. "Some Say" Released: February 21, 2005; 4. "No Reason" Released: February 28, 2005

Chuck is the third studio album by Canadian rock band Sum 41. The album was released on October 12, 2004. It was the last album to feature guitarist Dave Baksh before his departure from Sum 41 on May 11, 2006. Baksh later rejoined the band in 2015. Chuck peaked at No. 2 on the Canadian Albums Chart and No. 10 on the US Billboard 200, making it the band's highest-charting album until it would be surpassed by Underclass Hero in 2007.

The album's title is named after a volunteer UN peacekeeper named Chuck Pelletier who was in the Democratic Republic of the Congo where Sum 41 was filming a documentary for War Child Canada. Fighting broke out during production, and Pelletier helped the band evacuate their hotel during the fighting, as he was staying at the same hotel.

The album's lyrical content has been described as darker and more mature than the band's previous work. It also had a different sound, mixing punk rock and melodic hardcore with heavy metal. The album proved to be a success, receiving acclaim from both critics and fans, as well as selling over five million copies. Singles such as "We're All to Blame" and "Pieces" gained success on the Canadian and American charts, and the album won a Juno Award for "Rock Album of the Year" in 2005.

== Background ==
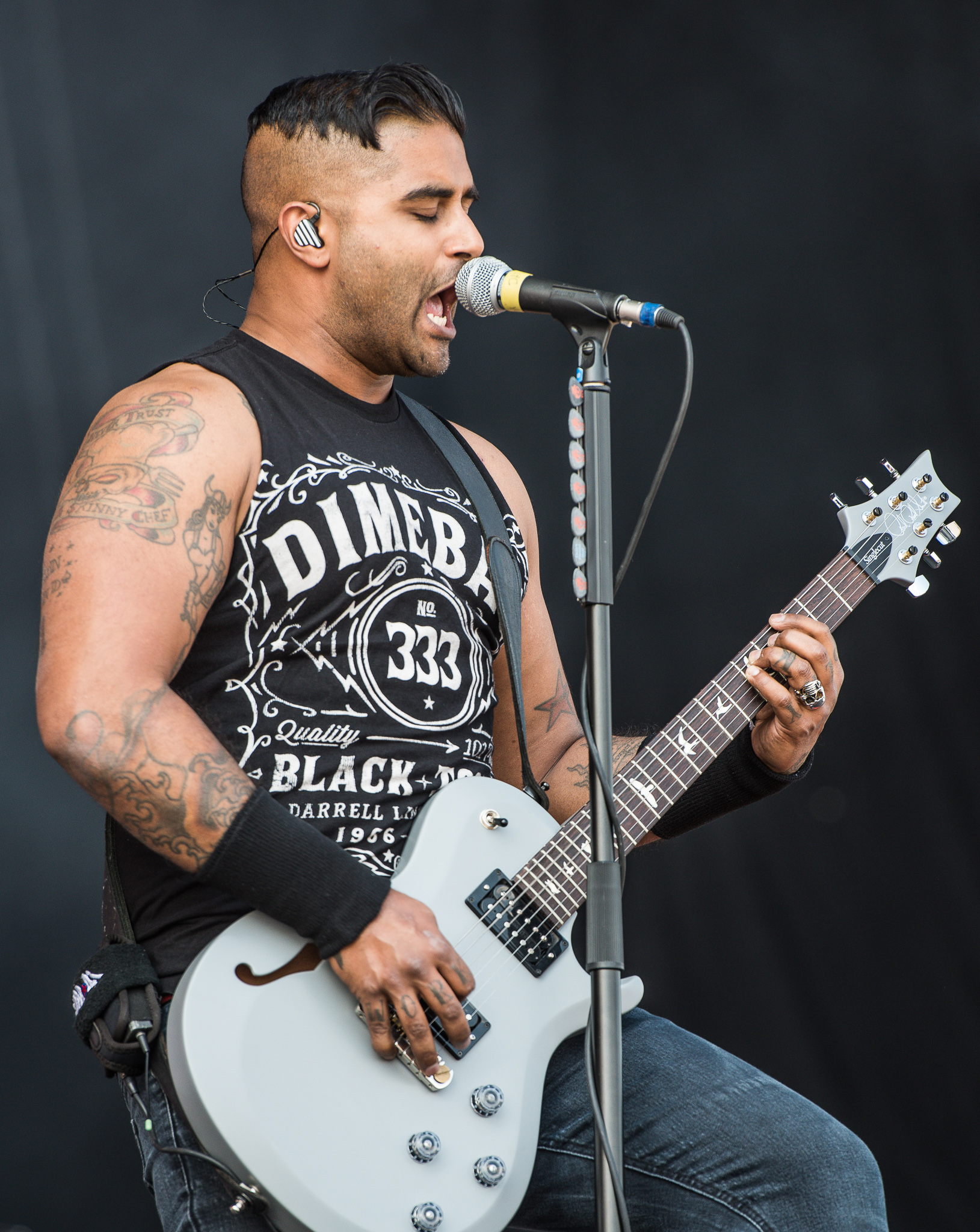
Following the release of Chuck, guitarist Dave Baksh left the band in 2006. He would eventually rejoin in 2015

The band's previous album Does This Look Infected? (2002) became a commercial and critical success, and the band went on a tour in the album's support. In mid-2004, the band took a break from touring and filmed a documentary for War Child Canada in the Democratic Republic of the Congo. The film was called Rocked: Sum 41 in Congo and was released in 2005 by MTV. However, fighting broke out during the filming while the band was staying in a hotel.

"The shooting was all around us, and all these people were waiting, probably to die," said drummer Steve Jocz, reflecting on the experience. "Two UN people arrived at the scene and gave a speech about how everything would be fine," bassist Jason "Cone" McCaslin mentioned. "And then after they left, things just went crazy."

Vocalist/rhythm guitarist Deryck Whibley mentioned that he thought that a day after the UN gave an update about safety, he was expecting they would be able to evacuate. The next day, the band members woke up at 5:00 in the morning when two gunshots were fired. "We went to the hotel's restaurant to get some breakfast, when the gunfire just got closer to us," said lead guitarist Dave "Brownsound" Baksh. A U.N. peacekeeper named Charles "Chuck" Pelletier instructed the residents of the hotel to leave the restaurant. Whibley recalled, "We all just went into Cone's room, where there was around 43 other people there. We were all hiding in the bathroom and hiding on the floor." Baksh added, "Our U.N. peacekeeper was armed with a club, a new club because the price tag was still on it, but they were armed with guns".

Pelletier continued to reassure the band and others at the hotel that everything would be okay. After the crowd was in hiding, Pelletier left to get help. The U.N. continued trying to find out as much information on the gunfire as possible, but updates were few. "After a while, the gunfire seemed to start dying down, and then people started to go outside and they started talking. We seemed to be feeling pretty good, but then out of nowhere, the huge gunfire just went off," stated Whibley. "This war was so unpredictable. At one point, it sounded like it was far away, and at another point, it sounded like it was right outside the door. Then Chuck came in and told everyone to wait for the APC's to arrive. That was probably the scariest part, when we were waiting to get into the APC's." Baksh recalled, "I remember just waiting there and just wondering what the fuck was gonna happen."

Pelletier called for armored carriers to take the hotel's occupants out of the hot zone. "By then, I just kept thinking about everything we did as a band and everything I've done as a person, and I thought, 'This is it. This is how we're gonna die,'" Whibley said. After nearly six hours, the carriers arrived, and the band and the forty other civilians were taken to safety. In honor of Pelletier, the band decided to name their next album after him. Pelletier was awarded the Medal of Bravery by the Governor General of Canada for his actions.

== Recording ==
By spring of 2003, the band members began practicing parts for a new album on their own before going into a studio. "The music's better, the songwriting's better, and there's more musical elements in this album," Jocz stated. "We put more elements in this time around, and it feels like the next logical step in what we want our band to sound like".

"We never wanted to make the same album over and over again. We've decided we wanted to do something different every time," said McCaslin. "We started practicing on our own, and then we just put all of our parts together." The album was also mentioned to having a lot of heavy metal influences on it, with Metallica and Iron Maiden being main inspirations for the album's style. "Dave was raised on a lot of heavy metal and grunge," McCaslin noted. "Deryck and I were raised more on California punk rock music," said Jocz. "When we started the band, we were mainly inspired by bands such as NOFX and Pennywise, but when you get older, your brain starts branching off and you start listening to other music."

Chuck was produced by Greig Nori, and recorded at various studios: Sound City in Van Nuys, California; Ocean in Burbank, California; Reaction in Toronto, Ontario; Umbrella Sound, Toronto, Ontario; Soundtrack, New York City; and Sidecar in North Hollywood, California. Matt Hyde acted as main engineer, with additional engineers Ed Krautner and Cameron Webb, both of whom operated Pro Tools; Jorge Vivo did additional editing. They were assisted by Pete Martinez (at Sound City), Miles Wilson (at Sound City), Jason Cupp (at Ocean), Chris Stringer (at Reaction), Robert Poteraj (at Soundtrack), Matthew Davies (at Soundtrack), and Steve Sisco (at Sidecar). "Intro", "Angels with Dirty Faces", "Open Your Eyes", "Slipping Away", "I'm Not the One", "Welcome to Hell", "Pieces", and "88" were mixed by Andy Wallace at Soundtrack, with assistance from Sisco; John O'Mahoney operated Pro Tools. "No Reason", "We're All to Blame", "Some Say", "The Bitter End", and "There's No Solution" was mixed by Tom Lord-Alge at South Beach Studios in Miami, Florida with assistant engineer Femio Hernández. Brian Gardner mastered the album at Bernie Grundman Mastering.

== Music and lyrics ==
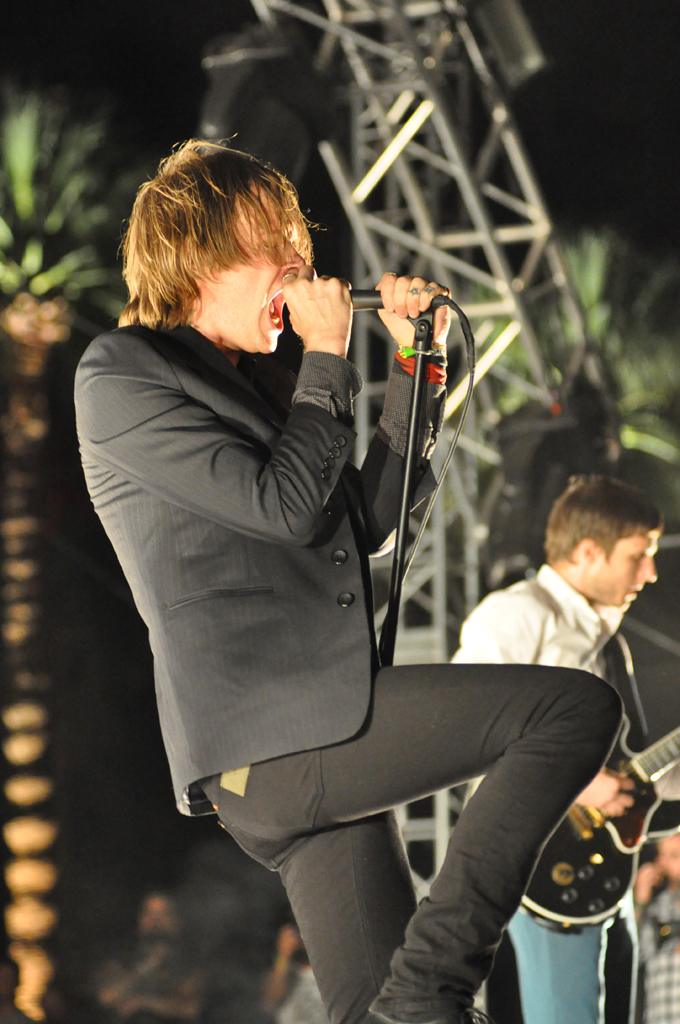
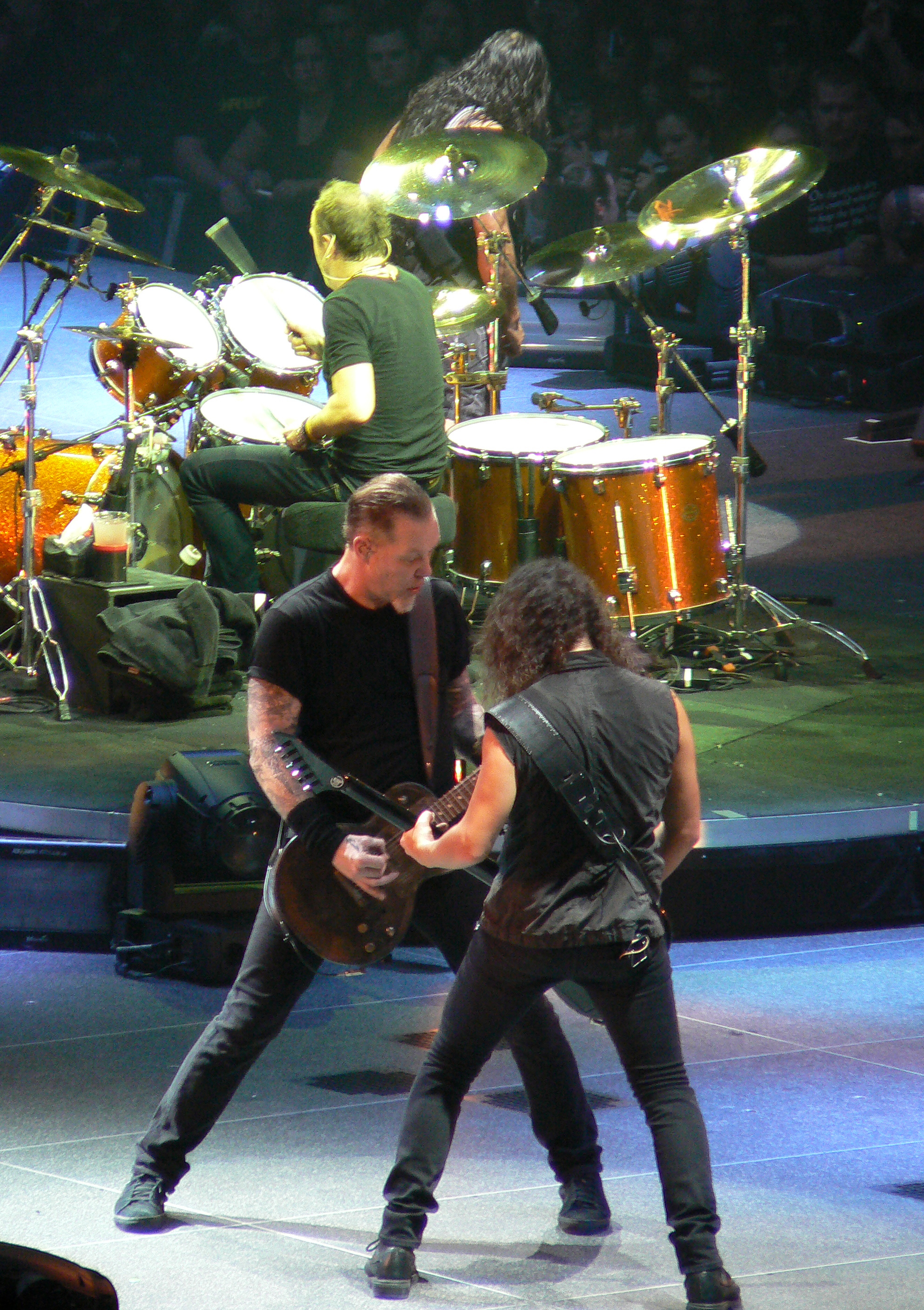
Sum 41 have cited Refused (left) and Metallica (right) as the biggest influences on Chuck

Chuck includes a variety of musical styles throughout its runtime, including melodic hardcore, thrash metal, pop-punk, indie rock and alternative rock. Critics have categorized the album as punk rock, alternative metal, melodic hardcore, heavy metal, hardcore punk, pop-punk, punk metal, skate punk, thrash metal, and hard rock. "The Bitter End" is thrash metal and "Welcome to Hell" is hardcore punk, while the fifth and eleventh tracks, "Some Say" and "Pieces" respectively, are alternative rock songs. Alternative Press considered it a "scene album".

On the sound of the album, the band have cited Metallica and Refused as major influences. Ultimate Guitar editor Jorge Martins described the album, as well as its follow up, as "fantastic examples" of merging "pop punk with thrash, NWOBHM, and alt-metal" and the band in general as a band who "perfected the art of combining punk rock and metal". Michael Endelman of Entertainment Weekly described it as "a meeting of two worlds — extreme metal and pop-savvy punk — that rarely pass each other in the halls, let alone hang out after school." Dave Simpson at The Guardian stated "The spiky quartet furnish their usual shouty vocals with grinding riffola and twiddly guitar solos, just as the rest of the post-Linkin Park world are realizing nu metal wasn't such a good idea." Alan di Perna of Guitar World called it "their heaviest album yet", and as going from "flirt[ing] with metal on both [prior] albums, but with Chuck they’ve fully embraced it." PopMatters writer Ethan Stewart described the album's sound as "primarily defined by a merger of heavily Metallica-indebted thrash with the kinds of alternative metal closest to System of a Down or Breaking Benjamin depending on the song... [it] is also structurally reminiscent of the melodic hardcore albums from the same period, namely No Warning’s Suffer, Survive and Rise Against's Siren Song of the Counter Culture."

The lyrical content is considered to be darker than on previous releases, which had earned the band a reputation for "rowdy personas and classic pop-punk sound," according to Alternative Press.

== Commercial performance ==
Chuck was a commercial success, selling over 5,000,000 copies worldwide. The album won a Juno Award in 2005 for Best Rock Album of the Year. The album was certified gold in Japan, double platinum in Canada and gold in the United States.

== Critical reception ==
Professional ratings
Aggregate scores
Source	Rating
Metacritic	63/100
Review scores
Source	Rating
AllMusic	4/5 stars
Alternative Press	3/5 stars
Blender	3/5 stars
Dotmusic	6/10
E! Online	B+
Entertainment Weekly	B+
The Guardian	2/5 stars
NME	5/10
Q	2/5 stars
Rolling Stone	3/5 stars

Chuck received positive reviews, with Metacritic giving the album an aggregated score of 63 out of 100 based on 11 reviews. AllMusic gave the album a positive review, saying "Chuck is a concise album that clocks in at just over a half-hour, with a basic understanding that fast and loud is what the band does best." Entertainment Weekly said that "It may sound heinous on paper, but trust us, the first single, "We're All to Blame," is far better than it has a right to be." E! Online said that "But whether they're being snotty or serious, there is a constant thread at work: those catchy melodies." Music OMH said that Chuck "isn't perfect" but also added that "Sum 41 have certainly added a heck of a lot more colour to their previously, partially monochrome musical output." Lane Devis of 411mania.com compared the album to Blink-182's 2003 self-titled album, Green Day's American Idiot, and Good Charlotte's The Chronicles of Life and Death, saying "The lyrics are serious in this album are far cries from the immature lyrics and antics that have become almost trademark for Sum 41." Common Sense Media gave it four stars out of five, saying "Rugged intensity makes up for the diminished playfulness. Lyrics are clean but somber. You don't like your life, politics, or the world we live in? You might not be able to do much about it, but perhaps – following the example of Sum 41 – you can write some interesting, lyrical songs about the stuff that drives you crazy", and also called it "socially conscious punk rock".

Decoy Music said "for the most part, it's obvious the band has grown up. There are some slower songs and some acoustic guitars and some ballads and all that good stuff. But the band still rocks hard 95% of the time and the fact they've gotten heavier actually accentuates their poppyness better than the punk aspect. The songs are still fast and guitar-driven, the drums are still extremely random and manic and awesome—all in all, this is still a Sum 41 record. But it's just a better one." Stuart Green of exclaim.ca said "Musically the band has never sounded more determined or cohesive (the notable exceptions being the Oasis sound-alike "Some Say" and the power mellower "Slipping Away" and "Pieces"). Lyrically the album also advances the case for these guys as strong songwriters." Diamond in the Rock said "Although some hail Chuck as a complete departure from the band's enjoyable punk style, this album adds diversity to Sum 41's discography as the hardcore rock vibes lend to an engaging, albeit satisfactorily brief, sound." However, not all reviews were positive. Punknews.org was somewhat disappointed with the album, saying "No one can deny the band's musical talent, and the more serious lyrical themes are a definite improvement, but the lack of consistency kills this album. The highlight of Sum 41's discography is going to come when they fully embrace their metal influences and make a straight-up metal album, and sadly Chuck misses the mark", but also added "If you are still under the impression that Sum 41 is a joke band or a Beastie Boys-wannabe, give some of these songs a try, and you may be pleasantly surprised." Robert Christgau assigned the album a "dud" rating.

== Track listing ==
All tracks written by Sum 41.

Original CD
No.	Title	Length
1.	"Intro" (Instrumental)	0:46
2.	"No Reason"	3:05
3.	"We're All to Blame"	3:39
4.	"Angels with Dirty Faces"	2:23
5.	"Some Say"	3:26
6.	"The Bitter End"	2:52
7.	"Open Your Eyes"	2:45
8.	"Slipping Away"	2:30
9.	"I'm Not the One"	3:35
10.	"Welcome to Hell"	1:57
11.	"Pieces"	3:02
12.	"There's No Solution"	3:18
13.	"88"	4:39
Total length:		37:50

International and SRC Vinyl edition bonus track
No.	Title	Length
14.	"Noots"	3:51

Japanese edition bonus tracks
No.	Title	Length
14.	"Noots"	3:51
15.	"Moron"	2:00
16.	"Subject to Change"	3:17

European iTunes edition bonus track
No.	Title	Length
14.	"Get Back" (Sum 41 rock remix) (with Ludacris)	4:13

== Personnel ==
Personnel per booklet.

Sum 41

- Deryck Whibley – vocals, rhythm guitar, piano, keyboards, Mellotron
- Dave "Brownsound" Baksh – lead guitar
- Jason "Cone" McCaslin – bass
- Steve "Stevo32" Jocz – drums

Production

- Greig Nori – producer
- Matt Hyde – engineer
- Ed Krautner – Pro Tools, additional engineer
- Cameron Webb – Pro Tools, additional engineer
- Jorge Vivo – additional editing
- Andy Wallace – mixing (tracks 1, 4, 7–11, 13)
- Steve Sisco – assistant
- John O'Mahoney – Pro Tools
- Tom Lord-Alge – mixing (tracks 2, 3, 5, 6, 12)
- Femio Hernández – assistant engineer
- Pete Martinez – assistant
- Miles Wilson – assistant
- Jason Cupp – assistant
- Chris Stringer – assistant
- Robert Poteraj – assistant
- Matthew Davies – assistant
- Brian Gardner – mastering

Artwork

- Louis Marino – art direction, album design
- GIA – illustrations, artwork

== Charts ==
Chart (2004)	Peak position
Australian Albums (ARIA)	13
Austrian Albums (Ö3 Austria)	35
Belgian Albums (Ultratop Flanders)	84
Belgian Albums (Ultratop Wallonia)	71
Canadian Albums (Billboard)	2
French Albums (SNEP)	9
German Albums (Offizielle Top 100)	32
Scottish Albums (Official Charts)	55
Swiss Albums (Schweizer Hitparade)	14
UK Albums (Official Charts)	59
US Billboard 200	10

== Certifications ==
Region	Certification	Certified units/sales
Canada (Music Canada)	2× Platinum	200,000^{^}
Japan (RIAJ)	Gold	100,000^{^}
United Kingdom (BPI)	Silver	60,000^{‡}
United States (RIAA)	Gold	500,000^{^}
^{^} Shipments figures based on certification alone.^{‡} Sales+streaming figures based on certification alone.

== Awards ==
=== Juno Awards ===
Year	Nominee / work	Award	Result
2005	Chuck	Rock Album of the Year	Won

== Chuck Acoustic EP (Tour Edition Promo) ==
Chuck Acoustic EP (Tour Edition Promo)

EP by Sum 41
- Released: February 22, 2005
- Recorded: 2004–2005
- Genres: Acoustic rock, alternative rock
- Label: Universal
- Producers: Greig Nori, Deryck Whibley

Sum 41 chronology
Chuck (2004)	Chuck Acoustic EP (Tour Edition Promo) (2005)	Go Chuck Yourself (2005)

Chuck Acoustic EP (Tour Edition Promo) is an acoustic EP released by Sum 41 in 2005 in Japan only. It was released after the release of the album Chuck with the Japanese tour edition of the album.

The EP features only five songs, all of which are all-new acoustic versions to previously released songs. "Pieces", "Some Say" and "There's No Solution" are featured on the album Chuck while, "Over My Head (Better Off Dead)" and "No Brains" are from the previous album Does This Look Infected?.

=== Track listing ===
1. "Pieces" (Acoustic) – 3:16
2. "No Brains" (Acoustic) – 3:03
3. "Over My Head (Better Off Dead)" (Acoustic) – 2:44
4. "Some Say" (Acoustic) – 3:42
5. "There's No Solution" (Acoustic) – 3:26
