= Underclass Hero =

Studio album by Sum 41
- Released: July 24, 2007
- Recorded: November 6, 2006 – March 14, 2007
- Studios: Ocean Way, Los Angeles, California; Sound City, Van Nuys, California; Sage & Sound, Hollywood, California
- Genres: Pop-punk; emo pop
- Length: 51:49
- Labels: Aquarius; Island
- Producer: Deryck Whibley

Sum 41 chronology
Chuck (2004)	Underclass Hero (2007)	Screaming Bloody Murder (2011)

Singles from Underclass Hero
- 1. "Underclass Hero" Released: May 17, 2007; 2. "Walking Disaster" Released: July 23, 2007; 3. "With Me" Released: February 28, 2008

Underclass Hero is the fourth studio album by Canadian rock band Sum 41. It is the first of two albums by the band recorded as a three-piece since the departure of guitarist Dave "Brownsound" Baksh the previous year. It was released on July 24, 2007 by Island Records and distributed worldwide by Aquarius Records, the band's final album on the label. In comparison to the heavy metal-inspired style of their previous album Chuck (2004), Underclass Hero marked a return to the band’s pop-punk sound.

The album was a commercial success, peaking at number 1 on the Canadian Albums Chart and at number 7 on the US Billboard 200, becoming the band’s highest-charting album to date. It received generally mixed reviews from critics, with some praising its songwriting, lyrics and production, while others found it to be too long, melodramatic, and derivative.

== Background ==
In his memoir, Walking Disaster, Whibley reveals that the album was quietly "ghost produced" by Rob Cavallo. Cavallo, best-known for his work with Green Day and My Chemical Romance, was under contract with Warner Bros. at the time and unable to work in a full capacity. He ended up advising Whibley weekly on his song progress, and suggested he utilize his engineer, Doug McKean, who ended up on the record.

The album was mainly recorded at Ocean Way Recording, at the tail-end of a period when record labels offered "extravagant" budgets. It was being recorded at the same time as The Best Damn Thing by Avril Lavigne, then Whibley's wife; it was tracked in an adjacent room. Whibley struggled with writer's block when making the album. He aimed to center songs on one theme, and attempted to write in a more unguarded, honest way. He developed an "expensive" habit of buying a new vintage guitar to aid in his development process. Despite this, he described the sessions as "carefree and fun," and easygoing considering most of the band had relocated to Los Angeles by that point.

In a video posted to his YouTube channel in February 2025, former drummer Steve Jocz listed Underclass Hero as his least favorite Sum 41 album that he has played on. Whibley concurred in his memoir, describing the tunes as "forced, distracted, and although unintentional, some of the work was unoriginal and reminiscent of things I had written before."

== Musical style ==
Critics have consistently described Underclass Hero as a revival of Sum 41's previous pop punk style in All Killer No Filler (2001) as opposed to the heavy metal and punk rock sound found in Chuck (2004). However, the album differentiates itself from the band's early sound, through the incorporation of instruments such as acoustic guitars, pianos, organs and synthesizers, theatricality, emphasis on dark and political lyrics, dynamics and its disregard for metal influences, creating a sound more inline with the emo pop genre. Furthermore, songs such as "Ma Poubelle" combine this with elements of show tunes. PopMatters writer Ethan Stewart stated that "The way that Underclass Hero layers pianos, acoustic guitars, vocal harmonies, and ambient synthesizers easily makes it Sum 41’s prettiest-sounding record to date."

== Release ==
On April 16, 2007, Underclass Hero was announced for release. The next day, "March of the Dogs" was released as a promotional single. On May 2, 2007, the title track was posted on the band's Myspace profile; the music video for it was posted online at the end of the month. The album's artwork was posted online on June 8, 2007. On July 9, 2007, "Walking Disaster" was posted on Myspace. The album was made available for streaming on July 17, 2007 through MTV's website, and released through Island on July 24. On the same day, the band performed the album in its entirety, which was subsequently posted on their website. In August, the band played two shows in Australia with Yellowcard and performed at a few dates on the Warped Tour, alongside a few US shows with Yellowcard, Monty Are I and Amber Pacific the following month. On August 20, 2007, the music video for "Walking Disaster" premiered on MTV2's website. In September and October 2007, the band went on a tour of the US with Schoolyard Heroes, which included an appearance at the X96 Big Ass Show radio festival. In November 2007, the band announced that singer/rhythm guitarist Deryck Whibley was suffering from a herniated disc, resulting in all of the remaining shows of the year to be cancelled. In February and March 2008, the band toured the UK, which was followed by a stint in Canada; both were supported by Die Mannequin and Social Code. They toured Australia in April 2008 with Pennywise, the Vandals and Bowling for Soup.

== Reception ==
Professional ratings
Aggregate scores
Source	Rating
Metacritic	50/100
Review scores
Source	Rating
AllMusic	2/5 stars
The A.V. Club	B+
Entertainment Weekly	B
The Guardian	1/5 stars
NME	4/10
Now	2/5 stars
PopMatters	4/10
Rolling Stone	2/5 stars
Spin	3/5 stars
Sputnikmusic	1/5

=== Critical reaction ===
Underclass Hero received praise for its songwriting and lyrical content, but received criticism for its similarities to Green Day's American Idiot and My Chemical Romance's The Black Parade. On review aggregator website Metacritic, the album currently holds an average score of 50/100 based on 12 reviews, indicating “mixed or average reviews”.

The A.V. Club gave the album a positive review, calling it "the band's smartest and most mature sounding album yet." Billboard also reacted positively, saying that "its growth feels genuine and, unlike Sum 41's punk peers, its musical maturation doesn't come at the expense of that all-important snotty 'tude." On the other hand, BBC was less favorable, saying that it "has its merits", but calling it a "disappointing effort". The Guardian, in a 1 star review, called the album "Green Day without the range and the charm".

Sputnikmusic gave the album a 1 out of 5, saying that it "tries its best to be profound and musically challenging, however its only success is found, without exception, in the tracks which drop the pretense entirely and return to the formula which made the group popular to begin with." IGN gave the album a 7 out of 10, drawing comparisons to Green Day regarding the album’s sound, but said that it’s “not a bad album”. Contactmusic.com said that the album was full of "mixed results". In 2018, Rock Sound ranked the album at #78 in their list of the Best 100 Pop Punk Albums.

=== Commercial performance ===
In Canada, Underclass Hero debuted at number 1 on the Canadian Albums Chart, selling just over 9,000 copies in its first week. In the United States, the album sold 44,601 copies in its first week and debuted at number 7 on the Billboard 200, making it their highest chart positioning to date in the U.S. As of April 2011, the album has sold 184,000 copies in the United States. As of 2013, it has sold over 1 million copies worldwide.

The album was led by the singles "Underclass Hero" and "Walking Disaster"; both achieving moderate radio success in 2007. The third single, "With Me", wasn't released as a single until 2008. Additionally, "March of the Dogs" was released as an album preview in April 2007 before its release, because the album "wouldn't be out until the summer".

=== Political backlash ===
The track "March of the Dogs" faced political backlash due to its radical opposition to then-United States President George W. Bush. This led to Whibley facing possible deportation in 2007 by a House of Representatives minority leader. However, this ultimately never came to pass.

== Track listing ==
All songs written and composed by Deryck Whibley, except where noted.

Standard edition
No.	Title	Lyrics	Length
1.	"Underclass Hero"	Whibley; Steve Jocz	3:14
2.	"Walking Disaster"		4:46
3.	"Speak of the Devil"		3:58
4.	"Dear Father"		3:52
5.	"Count Your Last Blessings"		3:03
6.	"Ma Poubelle"	Jocz	0:55
7.	"March of the Dogs"		3:09
8.	"The Jester"		2:48
9.	"With Me"		4:51
10.	"Pull the Curtain"		4:18
11.	"King of Contradiction"		1:40
12.	"Best of Me"		4:25
13.	"Confusion and Frustration in Modern Times"		3:46
14.	"So Long Goodbye"		3:01
Total length:			47:49

Hidden track (not available on all editions)
No.	Title	Length
15.	"Look at Me" (starts at 2:00)	4:03
Total length:		51:52

iTunes bonus track
No.	Title	Length
15.	"Take a Look at Yourself"	3:24
Total length:		51:13

International bonus track
No.	Title	Length
15.	"No Apologies"	2:58
Total length:		50:47

Japanese bonus track
No.	Title	Length
16.	"This Is Goodbye"	2:26
Total length:		53:13

== Personnel ==
Sum 41

- Deryck Whibley – vocals, guitars, producer
- Jason "Cone" McCaslin – bass
- Steve "Stevo32" Jocz – drums

Additional musicians

- Jamie Muhoberac – keyboards
- Dan Chase – percussion
- Michael Railton – piano

Technical

- Doug McKean – engineer
- Keith Armstrong – assistant engineer
- Adam Fuller – assistant engineer
- Nathan Johns – assistant engineer
- Nik Karpen – assistant engineer
- Wesley Seidman – assistant engineer
- David Campbell – string arrangement
- Chris Lord-Alge – mixing
- Ted Jensen – mastering

Artwork

- Jonathan Mannion – cover photo
- Patrick Hegarty – cover design
- Brian Lauzon – package design, photography
- Matt Taylor – package design, photography

== Release history ==
Region	Date
Japan	July 18, 2007
Canada/Europe	July 23, 2007
United States	July 24, 2007

== Charts ==
Chart (2007)	Peak position
Australian Albums (ARIA)	22
Austrian Albums (Ö3 Austria)	8
Belgian Albums (Ultratop Flanders)	85
Belgian Albums (Ultratop Wallonia)	72
Canadian Albums (Billboard)	1
French Albums (SNEP)	17
German Albums (Offizielle Top 100)	10
Irish Albums (IRMA)	66
Italian Albums (FIMI)	34
Japanese Albums (Oricon)	2
Scottish Albums (Official Charts)	57
Swiss Albums (Schweizer Hitparade)	9
UK Albums (Official Charts)	46
US Billboard 200	7
US Top Alternative Albums (Billboard)	1
US Top Rock Albums (Billboard)	1
US Tastemaker Albums (Billboard)	10

== Certifications ==
Region	Certification	Certified units/sales
Canada (Music Canada)	Gold	50,000^{^}
Japan (RIAJ)	Gold	100,000^{^}
^{^} Shipments figures based on certification alone.
