= Some Say (Sum 41 song) =

Single by Sum 41

from the album Chuck
- Released: February 21, 2005
- Recorded: Spring–Summer 2004
- Genre: Alternative rock
- Length: 3:26
- Label: Island
- Songwriters: Deryck Whibley; Greig Nori
- Producer: Greig Nori

Sum 41 singles chronology
"Pieces" (2004)	"Some Say" (2005)	"Underclass Hero" (2007)

"Some Say" is a song by Canadian rock band Sum 41. It was released in February 2005 as the third single from their 2004 album, Chuck. It was released with an accompanying music video.

== Background and lyrics ==
While playing the track live on the Go Chuck Yourself live album, lead singer Deryck Whibley jokingly stated that "this song is about your very, very, very confused parents."

== Music video ==
The music video starts out with the band members in a car, everyone but Whibley exits, and he starts singing. The video also features reverse editing of people doing various things, such as accidentally dropping groceries, with shots of the band in between, in the end of the video soldiers rush people away from doing mundane things such as grilling steak and sitting on a couch, while the rest of the band walks back to the car Whibley is still in the car singing and they drive off.
The set that was used for this video bares some resemblance to the one used in the movie Dogville by Lars von Trier, where there are not any walls, and the floor has lines that indicate the different spaces. Other than the final scene showing the band driving away, the video is shot in one continuous shot. This was the last music video until the release of "Fake My Own Death" to feature guitarist Dave Baksh.

== Track listing ==
=== Promo CD ===
No.	Title	Length
1.	"Some Say" (radio edit)	3:13
2.	"Some Say" (music video)	3:19

== Charts ==
Chart (2005)	Peak position
Canada CHR/Pop Top 30 (Radio & Records)	20
Canada Rock Top 30 (Radio & Records)	14
