= Underclass Hero (song) =

Single by Sum 41

from the album Underclass Hero
- Released: May 15, 2007
- Recorded: November 6, 2006 – March 2007
- Studio: Ocean Way Studios and Sage & Sound Studios (Hollywood) Sound City Studios (Van Nuys)
- Genre: Pop-punk
- Length: 3:16
- Label: Island
- Composer: Deryck Whibley
- Lyricists: Deryck Whibley; Steve Jocz
- Producer: Deryck Whibley

Sum 41 singles chronology
"Some Say" (2005)	"Underclass Hero" (2007)	"Walking Disaster" (2007)

Alternative cover

Music video
- "Underclass Hero" on YouTube

"Underclass Hero" is the first single from Sum 41's fourth studio album Underclass Hero. The song impacted radio on May 15, 2007. The song in its entirety was leaked on April 23 from a 91X podcast interview with Deryck Whibley. It was confirmed on Sum 41's official site that this would be the opening track for the album. The song was used in the EA Sports video game Madden 08 and Sony's NBA 08. It is the band's first single since the departure of guitarist Dave Baksh.

== Critical reception ==
Andrew Blackie of PopMatters cited the song as an example of "on[e of] those rare occasions when the trio do shut up and honestly play with as much zest as they can muster, which can thus be spoken about with half-hearted approval". Dave de Sylvia of Sputnikmusic compared the song to "Fat Lip", referring to it as a "less rhythmic variation".

== Music video ==
Sum 41's video for "Underclass Hero" was premiered May 29, 2007, on their official website. It shows the band playing behind a large group of teenagers, fireworks, a marching band and bonfire, supposedly a pre-high school pep rally for a football game with a mascot, which represents the anarchy symbol. The video was launched worldwide on May 31, 2007, on Total Request Live on MTV. The video was co-directed by Marc Klasfeld and Sum 41's drummer, Steve Jocz. This is Sum 41's first video without their former guitarist Dave Baksh, who had left the band the previous year, but returned in 2015.

The music video garnered Sum 41 a nomination at the 2008 MTV Video Music Awards Japan in the category for Best Group Video.

== Track listings and formats ==
- CD single
1. "Underclass Hero" – 3:14
2. "This Is Goodbye" – 2:28
3. "March of the Dogs" – 3:09
4. "Road to Run #4" (Webisode)
5. "Underclass Hero" (Video)

== Personnel ==
- Deryck Whibley – vocals, guitar, keyboards, piano, producer
- Jason McCaslin – bass
- Steve Jocz – drums

== Charts ==
Chart (2007)	Peak position
Australia (ARIA)	76
Canada Hot 100 (Billboard)	33
Canada Rock (Billboard)	8
Germany (GfK)	76
UK Singles (OCC)	188
US Bubbling Under Hot 100 (Billboard)	16
US Digital Song Sales (Billboard)	73
US Alternative Airplay (Billboard)	34
