= We're All to Blame =

Single by Sum 41

from the album Chuck
- Released: August 31, 2004
- Recorded: 2004
- Genre: Heavy metal; thrash metal
- Length: 3:38
- Label: Island
- Songwriters: Deryck Whibley; Greig Nori; Steve Jocz; Benjamin Peter Warden Cook
- Producer: Greig Nori

Sum 41 singles chronology
"Over My Head (Better Off Dead)" (2003)	"We're All to Blame" (2004)	"Pieces" (2004)

Music video
- We're All to Blame on YouTube

"We're All to Blame" is a song by Canadian rock band Sum 41. It was released to radio on August 31, 2004, as the first single from Chuck.

== Lyrical themes ==
Frontman Deryck Whibley said the song is about war, death, fear, corporate power and other concerns, and was written after the band's trip to the Congo, making it the last song written for Chuck.

== Music video ==
The video, directed by Marc Klasfeld, is a spoof of Solid Gold and features the Solid Gold dancers. At the end of the video, the announcer says that the next guest is Pain For Pleasure, Sum 41's heavy metal alter ego band.

== Reception ==
Fox83 of Sputnikmusic called the song an "impressive approach lyrically" and said "If System of a Down's 'Chop Suey!' had never been released then this could be leaning on originality. Aside from these irritations, 'We're All to Blame' is a great effort, and deserves its place on Chuck."

An Entertainment Weekly reviewer wrote, "It may sound heinous on paper, but trust us, the first single, 'We're All To Blame', is far better than it has a right to be."

IGN published a recommendation saying, "'We're All To Blame' is, bar none, the single best song Sum 41 has ever written and performed. A hard-hitting metal ballad that comments on global greed and its horrible consequences, the song not only stands out on Chuck but it stands out as the high point of Sum 41's entire catalogue."

== In popular media ==
"We're All to Blame" was used in Toho's Godzilla: Final Wars (2004) during a brief scene where Godzilla destroys Zilla in Sydney. The band received top billing in the opening credits.

== Track listing ==
1. We're All to Blame
2. Noots

== Charts ==
=== Weekly charts ===
Weekly chart performance for "We're All to Blame"
Chart (2004)	Peak position
Canada Rock Top 30 (Radio & Records)	12
US Alternative Airplay (Billboard)	10
US Mainstream Rock Airplay (Billboard)	36

=== Year-end charts ===
Year-end chart performance for "We're All to Blame"
Chart (2004)	Position
US Modern Rock Tracks (Billboard)	67
