= Pieces (Sum 41 song) =

2004 single by Sum 41

Single by Sum 41

from the album Chuck
- Released: November 15, 2004
- Genre: Alternative rock
- Length: 3:01
- Label: Island
- Songwriters: Deryck Whibley; Greig Nori
- Producer: Greig Nori

Sum 41 singles chronology
"We're All to Blame" (2004)	"Pieces" (2004)	"Some Say" (2005)

"Pieces" is a song written and recorded by Canadian rock band Sum 41. "Pieces" was released to radio on November 15, 2004, as the second single from the band's third studio album, Chuck (2004).

== Music video ==
The video directed by Brett Simon features lead vocalist Deryck Whibley melancholically walking throughout by City Hall East in the deserted Los Angeles Mall. Trucks with one clear side pass behind him, showing the other band members inside of them with signs labeling them as having "the perfect vacation", "the perfect night", "the perfect family", and "the perfect body." In the end, there is a truck with Whibley sitting alone in a sparsely furnished room labelled "the perfect life". At the end of the music video, the letter "F" from the word "life" labelled on the truck falls off, which leaves him with a sign labelled as "the perfect lie".

In an interview with Fuse TV, Whibley explained the letter "F" falling off of the truck's sign turned out both an ironic and unintended result. But since it fit in with their video's theme, they decided to use it anyway.

Drummer Steve Jocz stated that they wanted a semi-serious video. "The song is about a relationship, but not necessarily one with a girl. Maybe you're better left alone — fuck everybody else". The last single We're All to Blame was a pretty serious song, too, but we wanted to offset it with a funny video. With this one, we don't want it to be too hokey, but we don't want it to be too serious either. The trick is to make it interesting while playing up the fact that it is a sincere, genuine song."

== Track listing ==
1. "Pieces" (album version)
2. "Pieces" (acoustic)
3. "We're All to Blame" (album version)
4. "Pieces" (video)

== Charts ==
=== Weekly charts ===
Weekly chart performance for "Pieces"
Chart (2005)	Peak position
Canada CHR/Pop Top 30 (Radio & Records)	5
Canada Hot AC Top 30 (Radio & Records)	5
Canada Rock Top 30 (Radio & Records)	2
Germany (GfK)	84
US Bubbling Under Hot 100 (Billboard)	7
US Alternative Airplay (Billboard)	14

=== Year-end charts ===
Year-end chart performance for "Pieces"
Chart (2005)	Position
US Modern Rock Tracks (Billboard)	40

== Certifications ==
Certifications for "Pieces"
Region	Certification	Certified units/sales
Italy (FIMI)	Gold	50,000^{‡}
United States (RIAA)	Gold	500,000^{‡}
^{‡} Sales+streaming figures based on certification alone.

== Release history ==
Release dates and formats for "Pieces"
Region	Date	Format(s)	Label(s)	Ref(s).
United States	November 15, 2004	Alternative radio	Island	
United States	February 28, 2005	Contemporary hit; hot adult contemporary radio	Island	
