= Sake Bombs and Happy Endings =

- The DVD cover of Sake Bombs and Happy Endings
- Starring: Cone McCaslin; Dave Baksh; Deryck Whibley; Steve Jocz
- Distributed by: Universal Music; Aquarius Records
- Release date: 2003
- Language: English

Sake Bombs and Happy Endings is a DVD by the pop punk band Sum 41 of their promotional tour for "Does This Look Infected?" and filmed in Tokyo Bay NK Hall in Urayasu, Japan on May 17, 2003.

It was remastered in Dolby Digital 5.1. It also includes the music videos for "Still Waiting" and "Over My Head (Better Off Dead)".

During the song Nothing On My Back, Deryck can be heard singing lines from the Nirvana song You Know You're Right.

== Track listing ==
1. (opening credits) (2:28)
2. Mr. Amsterdam (3:09)
3. My Direction (2:07)
4. Hyper-Insomnia-Para-Condrioid (2:32)
5. Fat Lip (3:02)
6. All Messed Up (2:54)
7. All She's Got (3:18)
8. Over My Head (Better Off Dead) (2:58)
9. In Too Deep (3:20)
10. Machine Gun (3:09)
11. No Brains (4:53)
12. Heart Attack (3:10)
13. Nothing on My Back (4:10)
14. A.N.I.C. (1:32)
15. The Hell Song (3:17)
16. Thanks for Nothing (3:26)
17. Grab the Devil (1:39)
18. Still Waiting (2:41)
19. Hooch (3:38)
20. Motivation (3:05)
21. Pain for Pleasure (3:16)
22. Rabies (bonus material) (1:00)
23. Satan (bonus material) (1:00)
24. Violence (bonus material) (1:00)
25. All Messed Up (video edit) (3:06)
26. Still Waiting (video edit) (3:50)
27. Over My Head (Better Off Dead) (video edit) (2:51)
