= Makes No Difference =

2000 single by Sum 41

Single by Sum 41

from the EP Half Hour of Power
- Released: July 11, 2000
- Recorded: 2000
- Genre: Pop punk; skate punk
- Length: 3:10
- Label: Island; Big Rig
- Songwriter: Sum 41
- Producers: Greig Nori; Deryck Whibley

Sum 41 singles chronology
"Makes No Difference" (2000)	"Fat Lip" (2001)

Music video
- "Makes No Difference" on YouTube

"Makes No Difference" is the debut single by Canadian rock band Sum 41. It was released in June 2000 as the lead single from the band's extended play Half Hour of Power. The song is featured on the soundtracks for Bring It On, Out Cold and Van Wilder. A 2002 re-recording of the song was featured on Sum 41's greatest hits compilation, All the Good Shit.

== Background ==
In 1999, Sum 41 signed with Island Records after several major interested in the band. In May 2000, the Canadian music press already reported on the upcoming release of the EP Half Hour of Power and the beginning of radio promotion of the song "Makes No Difference". On June 27, 2000, the band released "Half Hour of Power" on Big Rig Records, a subsidiary label of Island and Aquarius, and "Makes No Difference" was the first single to.

== Release ==
In early July 2000, the song began to be promoted on North American alternative radio stations. Radio & Records included it in the list of new songs recommended to radio stations, and Gavin Report noted that the song had already begun to appear on stations oriented towards modern rock music. By the end of July, FMQB reported that more alternative radio stations were starting to play the single, and noted that the song stood out from other pop-punk singles.

Initially, the promotion of the composition was built around an edited home video, which the musicians had previously used when sending materials to record companies. It was a ten-minute compilation of the band's amateur footage of pranks, parodies, and street antics, overlaid with their The first version of the music video for "Makes No Difference" was a reworking of these materials, and a second, more professional video of the band performing at a house party was later filmed.

In support of Half Hour of Power, the band performed on the side stage of the Summersault Festival, which toured Canada, and also played several concerts as part of the Warped Tour. Deryck Whibley recalls that the song initially received little traction on radio and music television in Canada, but that changed after the music video began airing heavily on MTV By the time of its release, the song was the band's first notable breakthrough outside the local Canadian scene. In later interviews, members of Sum 41 recalled that it was after the music video for "Makes No Difference" appeared on MTV and MuchMusic that the band began to experience a noticeable increase in recognition that preceded the success of "Fat Lip".

== Music videos ==
There are two different music videos of this song, both of which were filmed in Toronto.

The first music video contains miscellaneous clips of the band performing, goofing around in shops and spraying people with water guns. This footage was used by the band in order to attract record labels.

The second video, which features Deryck Whibley with black hair, is a very large teenage house party that Sum 41 is playing at. A lot of destruction is done to the house as the night goes on, including a car being driven into the house. At one point, rapper DMX makes a cameo appearance on a quad bike. DMX agreed to be in the video as he had been in Toronto at the time filming Exit Wounds.

== Critical reception ==
Larry Flick, of Billboard magazine, reviewed the song favorably, saying that it "neatly walks a line between polished modern rock and a clever turn at accessible adult top 40, charged up with grimacing guitars and a pace frantic enough to shake the perm loose from the intended audience's girlfriends." FMQB also wrote that the song stood out from other pop-punk releases and was intended to attract the attention of listeners of alternative In a retrospective review of Half Hour of Power for New Noise, the song was named one of Sum 41's early hits, whose recognition was enhanced. In a retrospective list of the band's albums, Exclaim! magazine called "Makes No Difference" one of Half Hour of Power's most successful songs, describing it as an almost exemplary skate punk act of the early Sum.

== Appearances in other media ==
- A cover version of the song by Vinn Lombardo is featured in the 2006 Nintendo DS video game Elite Beat Agents.
- The song plays during the credits of the Funimation dub of Dragon Ball Z: Bardock - The Father of Goku.
- The song is featured in EA Sports' NHL 2002 and Dave Mirra Freestyle BMX 2.
- The song is featured on MuchMusic's Big Shiny Tunes 5 compilation album.
- The song also appears in the films Summer Catch, Out Cold and Van Wilder.
- The song is also featured in the 2000 film Bring It On.
- The song plays during the closing credits of Season 5 Episode 2 ("Sappy Anniversary") of the MTV animated series Daria.

== Personnel ==
- Deryck "Bizzy D" Whibley – lead vocals, rhythm guitar, producer
- Dave "Hot Chocolate" Baksh – lead guitar, backing vocals
- Jason "Cone" McCaslin – bass
- Steve "Stevo 32" Jocz – drums

== Charts ==
Chart (2000)	Peak position
Canada Rock (RPM)	26
US Alternative Airplay (Billboard)	32

== Release history ==
Region	Date	Formats(s)	Label(s)	Ref(s).
United States	July 11, 2000	Alternative radio	Island; IDJMG	
