= Craig Pattison =

Canadian guitarist (born 1971)

- Also known as: The Craigulator
- Born: Craig Pattison; 1971 (age 54–55)
- Origin: St. Catharines, Ontario, Canada
- Genres: Heavy metal Hard rock Reggae; Punk rock Glam metal
- Occupations: Musician, Guitarist
- Instruments: Guitar
- Years active: 1999 - present
- Label: Aquarius Records
- Formerly of: Brown Brigade

Craig "The Craigulator" Pattison (born 1971) is a Canadian guitarist, best known as former lead/rhythm guitarist for heavy metal band Brown Brigade, and former guitar tech for Dave Baksh (also in Brown Brigade) while the latter was a member of pop punk band Sum 41.

Pattinson grew up in St. Catharines, Ontario, and started playing guitar at age 11. He went to recording school at age 21, then moved to Toronto at age 24 to sell guitars while mixing and recording bands. He started his work as a guitar tech for Souldecision while touring with Christina Aguilera. Around 1998–1999 Craig worked as the guitar tech for Dave Baksh, lead guitarist for Sum 41.

When Baksh left the band to play heavy metal music with his new band Brown Brigade, he asked Craig to join him as Co-Lead/Rhythm guitarist in Brown Brigade.

Craig then joined the band and recorded with the band the "Appetizer for Destruction" EP and the full-length debut album "Into the Mouth of Badd(d)ness".

In September 2007, not long before the release of the debut album, Dave posted on the Brown Brigade website and in the Brown Brigade Myspace, that Craig is no longer a part of Brown Brigade.

Although never officially announced as a replacement for Pattison, Chuck Coles of Punk band Cauterize is currently replacing Pattison as the second guitarist for the band, although Pattison is still listed as a part of the band in the "Band members" page in Brown Brigade's official website.

Pattinson has worked as a guitar tech for such acts as Finger Eleven, Bryan Adams, Sum 41, Keith Scott, Jann Arden, Nelly Furtado, Three Days Grace, and The Trews.
