= Somewhere Between Free Men and Slaves =

Studio album by Organ Thieves
- Released: April 24, 2012
- Recorded: October 2–7, 2010 at BTown Sound, Burlington, Ontario, May 2011 in Coalition Studio
- Genre: Hard rock, folk rock, southern rock, soul
- Length: 48:00
- Label: MapleMusic Recordings
- Producer: Greig Nori

Organ Thieves chronology
God's Favorite Sons (2009)	Somewhere Between Free Men and Slaves (2012)

Somewhere Between Free Men and Slaves is the first full-length studio album by Canadian hard rock band Organ Thieves, released on April 24, 2012, through MapleMusic Recordings, through the Canada iTunes service, later followed by a physical CD release on May 8, 2012.

== Background ==
Pre-production for the album began in late 2009. The band recorded most of the album in 5 days, between October 2–October 7, 2010, at BTown Sound in Burlington, Ontario, with producer Greig Nori, who has previously worked with Dave Baksh in Sum 41, and with Chuck Coles and Matt Worobec in Cauterize. Additional recording took place in Coalition Studio in May 2011. The band has said many times that they prefer to self-release the album, rather than release it through a label, though on November 21, 2011, it was announced that the band has signed with MapleMusic Recordings, who would release the album.

The album was originally set for release for the spring of 2011. It was then delayed until the summer, when the band decided to re-record some songs, and it was delayed once again. On January 30, 2012, it was announced that the album would be released on April 24, 2012. The album's release was supported with a single show in Toronto, Ontario on March 21, supporting the recently reunited Treble Charger, whose frontman Greig Nori is the producer of the album.

== Track listing ==
No.	Title	Length
1.	"Simon's Wine"	3:10
2.	"Daddy's Little Girl"	3:58
3.	"Kids"	3:55
4.	"False Flag"	5:15
5.	"Phoebe"	3:19
6.	"Question"	3:36
7.	"Just Another Gun in the War Machine"	3:35
8.	"Come On Down"	4:12
9.	"Pale Horse"	4:08
10.	"Fix the Hearts of the Hollow"	4:42
11.	"Workers"	5:02
12.	"Your Princess is in Another Castle"	3:02

Working titles

- "Workers" - "Workers Get Paid"
- "Phoebe" - "GGC [Grandma's Got Cancer]" / "Long Way Home"
- "Kickin' Stones"
- "Disaster"

== Personnel ==
- Chuck Coles - lead vocals, guitar
- Dave Baksh - guitar
- Mike Smith – bass
- Theo McKibbon – drums, percussion
