= In Too Deep (Sum 41 song) =

2001 single by Sum 41

- Cover used for the Canada single release.

Single by Sum 41

from the album All Killer No Filler
- Released: September 4, 2001
- Recorded: January 2001
- Genre: Pop-punk
- Length: 3:27
- Label: Aquarius
- Songwriters: Deryck Whibley; Greig Nori
- Producer: Jerry Finn

Sum 41 singles chronology
"Fat Lip" (2001)	"In Too Deep" (2001)	"Motivation" (2002)

Alternative cover
- Cover used for the US single release.

Alternative cover
- Cover used for the Europe single release.

Audio sample
- "In Too Deep": file; help

Music Video
- "In Too Deep" on YouTube

"In Too Deep" is a song by Canadian rock band Sum 41. It is the seventh track on their debut studio album All Killer No Filler (2001), and was released as the second single in September 2001.

== History ==
According to Ben Cook of Fucked Up, No Warning and Young Guv, "In Too Deep" was originally a reggae song, to be released by writer Greig Nori's band Treble Charger and feature rapper Snow in the verses. This was later confirmed by drummer Steve Jocz in a YouTube video on the history of the song.

Singer Deryck Whibley told Kerrang! that one night when he was 18, he and his friend, guitarist Dave Baksh, were going to drive to downtown Toronto to hang out. Baksh was very late in picking Whibley up, and Whibley started playing around with his guitar while sitting by the window and waiting. The riff came first, and he started improvising verses and the chorus, and within three or four minutes, had come up with everything but the guitar solo and bridge. He recorded it on his small recorder before Baksh finally arrived, and didn't think much of it. He finally got around to finishing the whole song a few months later.

He said, "the words were based on very basic-level relationship stuff that I'd gone through in high school, because that was my reference point". Specifically, the inspiration was a bad relationship he'd had in 10th grade, which at the time had made him never want to have another girlfriend again. "I guess I was able to sort of tap into those early relationships, and it's universal, so I was milling the simplicity in that. There's something magical about that era in your life", he said.

== Music video ==
The music video was directed by Marc Klasfeld and premiered in September 2001. It is a parody of the diving competition scene from the Rodney Dangerfield film Back to School. Sum 41 face another dive team, represented as stereotypical high school "jocks" with muscular bodies and red Speedos. Each band member takes their turn diving off the board in comical fashion as they dive against their opposition, who dive with mocking perfection. After guitarist Dave Baksh completes his dive, he then rises out of the water to play his guitar solo (Baksh and bassist Jason "Cone" McCaslin have both confirmed this scene was inspired by the video for Guns N' Roses' "Estranged"). After each dive, the video cuts to a scene of the band playing in an empty pool surrounded by fans. For the last dive, drummer Steve Jocz does a comically dramatic dive similar to the dive done by Dangerfield's character in Back to School (known as the 'Triple Lindy' in the film) in which he bounces off of every diving board and lands perfectly in the water. Jocz is rewarded with near-perfect marks from the judges, the band wins the competition, and the judges and some of the audience jump into the pool in celebration.

The diving scenes were filmed at the since-demolished Industry Hills Aquatic Club in the City of Industry, California, the very same site as where the Back to School movie was shot. The pool scenes were shot at the Cadillac Jack's and Pink Motel in Sun Valley, California.

The video reached #1 on MuchMusic Countdown.

== Cover performances ==
The song has been covered live by other bands & artists with Deryck Whibley often being brought out to support. Most notable covers include:

- Avril Lavigne (Whibley's wife between 2006 and 2010) has performed live covers of "In Too Deep" multiple times, notably bringing out Deryck Whibley during her Greatest Hits Tour in Las Vegas on June 1, 2024 and previously during her 2008 Japan tour when they were married.
- Good Charlotte performing with Whibley on October 2, 2025.
- Jonas Brothers performing with Whibley & Frank Zummo on September 22, 2025, on the former's Greetings from Your Hometown tour.

== In popular culture ==
- The song is featured in the 2001 comedy film American Pie 2 during one of the closing scenes.
- The song is featured in the 2003 family comedy film Cheaper by the Dozen during a montage of Tom attempting to keep himself and his children in check while his wife is out of town.
- In "Joker: The Killing Vote", an episode of the TV series Harley Quinn, Two-Face claims to have listened to the song after unknowingly making lyrical references.
- In the Malcolm in the Middle episode "Reese Drives", as Reese engages in a low-speed police chase with fellow student Jackie as a passenger, the song plays as he perfectly completes the driver's ed course with the police in tow.
- The song is featured in the trailer for the 2005 film Guess Who.
- Taco Bell used the song in a commercial for its "Y2K Faves Are Back" promotion in 2025.
- The song is featured in the 2026 video game Just Dance: Decades of Hits as part of the main tracklist.

== Track listings ==
Single

1. In Too Deep (3:27)
2. Fat Lip (Live) (2:55)
3. All She's Got (Live) (3:02)
4. It's What We're All About (Live, With Tommy Lee on drums) (2:47)

== Charts ==
=== Weekly charts ===
Chart (2001–02)	Peak position
Australia (ARIA)	29
Austria (Ö3 Austria Top 40)	52
Belgium (Ultratop 50 Flanders)	36
Canada Radio (Nielsen BDS)	20
France (SNEP)	36
Germany (GfK)	69
Ireland (IRMA)	12
Netherlands (Dutch Top 40)	39
Netherlands (Single Top 100)	41
New Zealand (Recorded Music NZ)	47
Scottish Singles Sales (Official Charts)	13
Switzerland (Schweizer Hitparade)	87
UK Singles (Official Charts)	13
UK Rock & Metal (Official Charts)	1
US Alternative Airplay (Billboard)	10

=== Year-end charts ===
Chart (2001)	Position
UK Singles (OCC)	194
US Modern Rock Tracks (Billboard)	81

Chart (2002)	Position
US Modern Rock Tracks (Billboard)	81

== Certifications ==
Region	Certification	Certified units/sales
Germany (BVMI)	Gold	300,000^{‡}
Italy (FIMI)	Gold	35,000^{‡}
New Zealand (RMNZ)	Platinum	30,000^{‡}
Spain (Promusicae)	Gold	30,000^{‡}
United Kingdom (BPI)	2× Platinum	1,200,000^{‡}
United States (RIAA)	2× Platinum	2,000,000^{‡}
^{‡} Sales+streaming figures based on certification alone.

== Release history ==
Region	Date	Format(s)	Label(s)	Ref.
United States	September 25, 2001	Alternative radio	Island	
United Kingdom	December 3, 2001	CD; cassette	Mercury	
Japan	January 23, 2002	CD	Island	
Australia	February 11, 2002	CD	Island	
