= God's Favorite Sons =

EP by Organ Thieves
- Released: March 2009
- Recorded: January 2009 in The Boom Cave, Oshawa, Ontario, Canada
- Genre: Hard rock, southern rock, reggae
- Length: 20:18
- Label: Self-released
- Producer: Jason Bone, Organ Thieves

Organ Thieves chronology
God's Favorite Sons (2009)	Somewhere Between Free Men and Slaves (2012)

God's Favorite Sons is the debut EP by Canadian hard rock band Organ Thieves (then known as The Organ Thieves), self-produced and released in March 2009.

The EP includes 5 first demo songs recorded by the band in Jesse Smith and Jason Bone's studio "The Boom Cave" in Oshawa, Ontario, in January 2009. The EP was co-produced by the band and former Cauterize bassist Jason Bone.

The music on the EP ranges from simple hard rock to more bass-driven reggae tracks, as well as more country and blues influenced southern rock songs.

The songs "Fix the Hearts of the Hollow" and "Question Your Crown" were later re-recorded for the band's first full-length album Somewhere Between Free Men and Slaves, which was released in 2012.

== Track listing ==
No.	Title	Length
1.	"Fix the Hearts of the Hollow"	3:47
2.	"Sinful"	3:35
3.	"Shot Down"	4:34
4.	"Question Your Crown"	3:50
5.	"Disaster"	4:30
Total length:		20:18

== Personnel ==
- Chuck Coles - lead vocals, guitar
- Dave Baksh - guitar
- Ben Davies - guitar, mandolin
- Mike Smith – bass
- John Owens – drums, percussion
