= Over My Head (Better Off Dead) =

Single by Sum 41

from the album Does This Look Infected?
- Released: June 23, 2003
- Recorded: 2002
- Length: 2:29
- Label: Island
- Songwriter(s): Steve Jocz; Greig Nori; Deryck Whibley
- Producer(s): Greig Nori

Sum 41 singles chronology
"The Hell Song" (2003)	"Over My Head (Better Off Dead)" (2003)	"We're All to Blame" (2004)

"Over My Head (Better Off Dead)" is a song by Canadian rock band Sum 41. It was released in June 2003 as the third and final single from their 2002 album Does This Look Infected?. An acoustic version of the song can be found on the European single and on the Chuck Acoustic EP in 2005.

== Background and writing ==
Sum 41's lead vocalist Deryck Whibley spoke about the song's meaning, saying, "It's not about being fucked up or drunk," Whibley said. "It's more about the aftermath when you're hearing everything you've just done the night before, and you're like, "Ah, fuck, I'm better off dead." I don't regret any of the things I do and I don't mind doing them, I just hate hearing about it. Being told every morning, "Dude, what did you do last night?" drives me nuts."

== Music video ==
The video was released in Canada, Japan, and the UK only. It was directed by Chris Hafner and shows assorted backstage footage and concert clips.

== Track listings and formats ==
- European CD 1
1. "Over My Head (Better Off Dead)" – 2:29
2. "Over My Head (Better Off Dead)" (Acoustic) – 2:45
- Australian CD single
1. "Over My Head (Better Off Dead)" – 2:31
2. "Over My Head (Better Off Dead)" (Live) – 2:56
3. "The Hell Song" (Live) – 3:10
4. "Still Waiting" (Live) – 2:52
- European CD 2
1. "Over My Head (Better Off Dead)" – 2:31
2. "Mr. Amsterdam" (Live) – 3:56
3. "Still Waiting" (Live) – 2:52
4. "The Hell Song" (Live) – 3:10

== Charts ==
Chart (2003)	Peak position
Australia (ARIA)	62
