= What We're All About =

Single by Sum 41

from the album Music from and Inspired by Spider-Man
- Released: April 17, 2002 (UK)
- Genre: Rap rock; pop-punk
- Length: 3:49
- Label: Island; Columbia; Roadrunner; Sony Music Soundtrax
- Songwriters: Deryck Whibley; Dave Brownsound; Stevo Jocz
- Producers: Greig Nori; Deryck Whibley; Rick Rubin (additional)

Sum 41 singles chronology
"Motivation" (2002)	"What We're All About" (2002)	"Still Waiting" (2002)

Music video
- "What We're All About" on YouTube

"What We're All About" (titled "It's What We're All About" on the single cover) is a song by Canadian rock band Sum 41. It was released in April 2002 as a single for the soundtrack to the film Spider-Man.

== Background ==
The track contains a guest guitar solo performed by Slayer guitarist Kerry King. He reportedly turned down the offer to appear on the track initially, but was eventually convinced otherwise by a friend at his record label, who reminded him of his performance on "No Sleep Till Brooklyn" by the Beastie Boys. He recounted: "That was my epiphany. That was before we put ourselves back on the map – those dudes were fun and they were popping."

== Composition ==
"What We're All About" is a reworked version of the second half of "Dave's Possessed Hair/It's What We're All About" from the band's first EP, Half Hour of Power. Part of the first verse is rapped in an a cappella version in the beginning of the "Fat Lip" music video. Similar to "Fat Lip", vocal duties in "What We're All About" are split evenly between lead singer and rhythm guitarist Deryck Whibley, drummer Steve Jocz, and lead guitarist Dave "Brownsound" Baksh. The song segues into the 55-second instrumental track, "Ride the Chariot to the Devil", on the EP version of the song.

In September 2001, Whibley mentioned that the band wanted to feature rappers Redman and Method Man in the reworked version of the song, but this did not end up happening.

== Music video ==
The music video for "What We're All About" was directed by Marc Klasfeld and premiered in mid-2002. It features the Sum 41 band members playing upside-down with their instruments chained to the roof as they perform on the rooftop to the audience below. Throughout the video, various clips of the Spider-Man movie play, and in the middle of the performance, Slayer guitarist Kerry King makes a cameo appearance, performing his guitar solo in the song. Near the end of the video, the band members leap into the audience below as the party segues into the scene from the movie where Spider-Man returns from his battle with Green Goblin with a cut on his arm. As the blood drips and hits the floor, the entire audience looks up, only to see nothing, leaving everyone confused.

== Track listing ==
1. "It's What We're All About"
2. "Handle This" (live version)

== Personnel ==
Sum 41

- Deryck "Bizzy D" Whibley – lead vocals, rhythm guitar
- Dave "Brownsound" Baksh – lead vocals, lead guitar
- Jason "Cone" McCaslin – bass guitar, backing vocals
- Steve "Stevo 32" Jocz – lead vocals, drums

Additional musician

- Kerry King – guitar solo

== Charts ==
Chart (2002)	Peak position
Australia (ARIA)	63
Germany (GfK)	91
Ireland (IRMA)	23
Italy (FIMI)	30
Netherlands (Single Top 100)	71
Scottish Singles Sales (Official Charts)	30
Switzerland (Schweizer Hitparade)	43
UK Singles (Official Charts)	32
UK Rock & Metal (Official Charts)	4
