= All Killer No Filler =

Studio album by Sum 41
- Released: May 8, 2001
- Recorded: September 2000 – March 2001
- Studios: Metalworks in Mississauga, Ontario, and Cello Studios in Los Angeles, California
- Genres: Pop-punk; skate punk
- Length: 32:14
- Labels: Aquarius (Canada); Island (US)
- Producer: Jerry Finn

Sum 41 chronology
Half Hour of Power (2000)	All Killer No Filler (2001)	Does This Look Infected? (2002)

Singles from All Killer No Filler
- 1. "Fat Lip" Released: April 22, 2001; 2. "In Too Deep" Released: September 4, 2001; 3. "Motivation" Released: January 5, 2002

All Killer No Filler is the debut studio album (Note: Some sources consider Half Hour of Power a studio album and other sources consider it an extended play.) by Canadian rock band Sum 41, released on May 8, 2001. It was certified platinum in the United States, Canada, and in the UK.

Despite mixed reviews, the album was a commercial success, peaking at No. 13 on the Billboard 200. The single, "Fat Lip" peaked at No. 1 on the Billboard Alternative Airplay.

== Composition, music, and influences ==
The album's style has been described as pop-punk and skate punk. Additionally, Loudwire stated that the album represented scene music. NOFX's album Punk in Drublic was a considerable influence on the album. Sum 41's vocalist/rhythm guitarist Deryck Whibley cites Rancid, Elvis Costello, the Beatles, and Pennywise as influences on All Killer No Filler. The band has mentioned Green Day as their main influence for the album. "I was about 14 when Dookie came out," Whibley says. "I remember seeing the video for 'Basket Case' for the first time... It had so much energy and it was so different. I'd never seen anything like it before. From then I was an instant fan."

Absolutepunk described the album as "the album that your parents don't want you to discover at age 11 when you're just starting to think that school is bullshit and the only thing that really matters is that ridiculously cute girl who honestly treats you like shit", as well as adding "The lyrics are broad enough that everyone can relate to them, but specific enough that each song makes you think of a certain person or situation in your life. The perfect balance".

Drummer Steve Jocz wrote "Pain for Pleasure" in 10 minutes while he was on the toilet. The song, sung by Jocz, is an homage to the style of Iron Maiden. During performances, the band takes on costumes and persona in that style.

== Release ==
On March 8, 2001, All Killer No Filler was announced for release in two months' time. All Killer No Filler, which was Sum 41's first full-length album, was released on May 8, 2001. In August, the band performed at Edgefest II in Canada. In October, the band embarked on a headlining US tour, with support from Unwritten Law and Gob. Alongside the tour, the band performed on Saturday Night Live. In April 2002, the band went on a tour of the east coast US and Canada territories, with support from H_{2}O, and Autopilot Off. Following this, the band toured the US and Canada with Goldfinger. On April 6, 2011, a special edition of the album was released to celebrate the 10th anniversary of All Killer No Filler, exclusive to Japan.

From the initial success of the album, Deryck Whibley stated that it led him to "immediate embarrassment" stating that "I've always felt it wasn't that great, if I'm being honest," and "I never quite understood - to a point where it's almost like, when people tell me it means a lot to them or it was a really good album compared to other records, I always think they're lying."

An exclusive version of the album with the black grid replaced with blue was released in the UK, along with featuring "Makes No Difference" as a bonus track, previously released in the band's first EP, Half Hour Of Power.

== Reception and commercial performance ==
Professional ratings
Review scores
Source	Rating
AllMusic	4/5 stars
Christgau’s Consumer Guide	(1-star Honorable Mention)
Drowned in Sound	4/10
Entertainment Weekly	C+
Kerrang!	4/5 stars
Rolling Stone	3/5 stars
The Rolling Stone Album Guide	4/5 stars

Despite initially receiving mixed reviews in 2001, the album has received retrospective acclaim in more recent years. AllMusic said "It would be a mistake to view Sum 41 as just another second-rate band cashing in on the early-'00s punk-pop boom, even if it did recruit Jerry Finn to produce All Killer No Filler." Top40.com ranked the album as the 9th greatest pop punk album of all time. The album was included in Rock Sound's 101 Modern Classics list at number 46. The album was included at number 11 on Rock Sound's "The 51 Most Essential Pop Punk Albums of All Time" list.

The album was a big commercial success; it was certified platinum by the Recording Industry Association of America in August 2001 and in 2002, it was reported that the album sold at least 1,690,000 copies in the United States. "Fat Lip" was the most successful song on All Killer No Filler, going to number 66 on the Billboard Hot 100 on September 8, 2001 and number 1 on the Alternative Songs chart on August 18, 2001. "In Too Deep" went to number 10 on the Alternative Songs chart on December 1, 2001. All Killer No Filler went to number 13 on the Billboard 200 on August 4, 2001, and was on the Billboard 200 for 49 weeks. During 2001, "Fat Lip" went to number 1 on MTV's Total Request Live many times. All Killer No Filler was among the top 30 best-selling albums of 2001 in Canada and the third-best selling album of the year in Canada by a Canadian artist. Between 1996 and 2016, All Killer No Filler was among the top 20 best-selling albums by Canadian bands in Canada.

== Track listing ==
All tracks are written by Deryck Whibley, except where noted.

No.	Title	Writer(s)	Length
1.	"Introduction to Destruction"	Steve Jocz	0:38
2.	"Nothing on My Back"	Whibley, Jocz	3:01
3.	"Never Wake Up"		0:50
4.	"Fat Lip"	Whibley, Jocz, Dave Baksh	2:58
5.	"Rhythms"		2:59
6.	"Motivation"		2:50
7.	"In Too Deep"		3:27
8.	"Summer" (re-recorded version; originally appears on Half Hour of Power)		2:49
9.	"Handle This"	Whibley, Baksh	3:37
10.	"Crazy Amanda Bunkface"		2:16
11.	"All She's Got"	Whibley, Baksh	2:22
12.	"Heart Attack"		2:49
13.	"Pain for Pleasure"	Whibley, Jocz, Baksh, Jason McCaslin	1:43
Total length:			32:14

UK bonus track
No.	Title	Writer(s)	Length
14.	"Makes No Difference" (originally appears on Half Hour of Power)	Whibley, Nori	3:11
Total length:			35:32

Japanese 10th Anniversary edition bonus tracks
No.	Title	Writer(s)	Length
14.	"Makes No Difference" (originally appears on Half Hour of Power)	Whibley, Nori	3:11
15.	"What I Believe" (originally appears on Half Hour of Power)	Whibley, Nori	2:49
16.	"Machine Gun" (originally appears on Half Hour of Power)		2:29
17.	"T.H.T." (originally appears on Half Hour of Power)		0:43
18.	"What We're All About" (re-recorded version; originally appears on Half Hour of Power) (featuring Kerry King of Slayer)	Whibley, Jocz, Baksh	3:34
19.	"Fat Lip" (live)	Whibley, Jocz, Baksh	2:57
20.	"Motivation" (live)		3:08
21.	"Crazy Amanda Bunkface" (live)		2:03
22.	"All She's Got" (live)	Whibley, Baksh	3:06
23.	"Makes No Difference" (live)	Whibley, Nori	4:57
24.	"Machine Gun" (live)		2:53
25.	"What We're All About" (featuring Tommy Lee of Mötley Crüe) (live)	Whibley, Jocz, Baksh	2:26
Total length:			61:08

Japanese 10th Anniversary edition bonus DVD
No.	Title	Length
1.	"Homemade film EPK"	7:30
2.	"Going Going Gonorrhea EPK"	5:59
3.	"Japan EPK" (Part 1)	11:41
4.	"Japan EPK" (Part 2)	11:53
Total length:		37:03

== The 7 Series: All Killer No Filler ==
Island Records released an EP to promote the All Killer No Filler album by releasing seven songs from the album.

1. "Nothing on My Back"
2. "Fat Lip"
3. "Rhythms
4. "Motivation"
5. "In Too Deep"
6. "Handle This"
7. "Pain for Pleasure"

== Personnel ==
Sum 41

- Deryck "Bizzy D" Whibley – lead vocals, rhythm guitar; drums on "Pain for Pleasure"
- Dave "Brownsound" Baksh – lead guitar, backing vocals; rapping on "Fat Lip" and "What We're All About"; co-lead vocals on "Pain for Pleasure"
- Jason "Cone" McCaslin – bass
- Steve "Stevo32" Jocz – drums; rapping on "Fat Lip" and "What We're All About"; lead vocals on "Pain for Pleasure"; spoken word on "Introduction to Destruction"

Additional musicians

- Greig Nori – backing vocals on "Motivation", "In Too Deep" and "Handle This", additional guitar on "Handle This" and "Pain for Pleasure"
- Kerry King – guitar solo on "What We're All About"
- Tommy Lee – drums on "What We're All About" (live)

Artwork

- Chris Wahl – inner inlay photo
- Jonathan Mannion – outer inlay & interior group photo design
- Kim Kinakin – album design

Production

- Jerry Finn – producer
- Tom Lord-Alge – mixing
- Joe McGrath – engineer
- Sean O'Dwyer – engineer
- Brian Gardner – mastering

== Charts ==
=== Weekly charts ===
Weekly chart performance for All Killer No Filler
Chart (2001–02)	Peak position
Australian Albums (ARIA)	33
Austrian Albums (Ö3 Austria)	19
Belgian Albums (Ultratop Flanders)	11
Canadian Albums (Billboard)	9
Dutch Albums (Album Top 100)	69
French Albums (SNEP)	25
German Albums (Offizielle Top 100)	29
Irish Albums (IRMA)	22
New Zealand Albums (RMNZ)	16
Scottish Albums (Official Charts)	85
Swiss Albums (Schweizer Hitparade)	39
UK Albums (Official Charts)	7
US Billboard 200	13

=== Year-end charts ===
2001 year-end chart performance for All Killer No Filler
Chart (2001)	Position
Canadian Albums (Billboard)	30
UK Albums (OCC)	56
US Billboard 200	75

2002 year-end chart performance for All Killer No Filler
Chart (2002)	Position
Belgian Albums (Ultratop Flanders)	54
Canadian Albums (Billboard)	65
Canadian Alternative Albums (Billboard)	18
French Albums (SNEP)	82
UK Albums (OCC)	83
US Billboard 200	175

== Certifications ==
Certifications for All Killer No Filler
Region	Certification	Certified units/sales
Australia (ARIA)	Gold	35,000^{^}
Canada (Music Canada)	3× Platinum	300,000^{^}
Japan (RIAJ)	Gold	100,000^{^}
United Kingdom (BPI)	2× Platinum	600,000^{‡}
United States (RIAA)	Platinum	1,000,000^{^}
^{^} Shipments figures based on certification alone.^{‡} Sales+streaming figures based on certification alone.
