= Still Waiting (Sum 41 song) =

2002 single by Sum 41

Single by Sum 41

from the album Does This Look Infected?
- B-side: "All Messed Up" (demo); "Motivation" (live)
- Released: October 14, 2002
- Genre: Punk rock; thrash metal; heavy metal
- Length: 2:38
- Label: Aquarius; Island
- Songwriters: Deryck Whibley; Greig Nori
- Producer: Greig Nori

Sum 41 singles chronology
"What We're All About" (2002)	"Still Waiting" (2002)	"The Hell Song" (2003)

"Still Waiting" is a song by Canadian rock band Sum 41. It was released in October 2002 as the lead single from their second studio album, Does This Look Infected?. Frontman Deryck Whibley wrote the song as a last-minute addition to the album. Inspired by the post-9/11 political climate and a desire to create a "war on everything" anthem, the track was written quickly after the chorus melody came to him in a dream.

== Critical reception ==
Gareth Dobson of Drowned in Sound criticized the song, writing "Worst of all, the band choose to articulate their sense of misplaced rage in the form of a sub-Offspring SoCal punk dirge. I'd like to say I preferred it when they sang about girls n'that, but I didn't. I just want them to go away."

== Music video ==
Whibley conceived the idea of the video after a conversation with the Strokes singer Julian Casablancas about the trend of bands with numbers and "the" in their names. At Casablancas's encouragement, the video is a parody of the Strokes video for their song "Last Nite" while the band is wearing matching outfits similar to the Hives.

The video, directed by Marc Klasfeld, starts with the band members entering the office of a record executive (played by Will Sasso). He says the "number band thing" is "out" and changes the band's name to "The Sums" and the members' individual names (Deryck is "Sven", Cone is "Thurston", Dave is "Holmes", and Stevo is "Sergio"). The band then plays the song on a set spoofing the Hives, the Strokes, and the Vines and includes various images of arcade games. At the start of the last chorus, Deryck breaks the choreography and starts trashing his equipment and Dave, Cone, and Stevo do the same thing. The video ends with the four band members pushing down The Sums' name behind them.

Apart from the introduction, the performance was recorded at 60 frames per second (on video) as if it was a live performance.

== Track listings ==
CD single

1. "Still Waiting"
2. "All Messed Up" (demo)
3. "Motivation" (live at the Astoria)
4. "Still Waiting" (demo) (absent on some versions)
5. "Still Waiting" (CD ROM Video)

CD Single 2

1. "Still Waiting"
2. "In Too Deep" (live from Astoria)
3. "Fat Lip" (live from Astoria)

CD Single 3

1. "Still Waiting"
2. "All Messed Up" (demo)

== Charts ==
=== Weekly charts ===
Chart (2002–2003)	Peak position
Australia (ARIA)	43
Belgium (Ultratop 50 Flanders)	49
Canada (Billboard)	40
France (SNEP)	44
Germany (GfK)	90
Ireland (IRMA)	20
Italy (FIMI)	21
Norway (VG-lista)	16
Scottish Singles Sales (Official Charts)	14
Sweden (Sverigetopplistan)	33
Switzerland (Schweizer Hitparade)	97
UK Singles (Official Charts)	16
UK Rock & Metal (Official Charts)	1
US Bubbling Under Hot 100 (Billboard)	6
US Alternative Airplay (Billboard)	7

=== Year-end charts ===
Chart (2003)	Position
US Modern Rock Tracks (Billboard)	24

== Certifications ==
Region	Certification	Certified units/sales
Germany (BVMI)	Gold	250,000^{‡}
Italy (FIMI)	Platinum	100,000^{‡}
Japan (RIAJ)	Gold	100,000^{*}
New Zealand (RMNZ)	Gold	15,000^{‡}
Spain (Promusicae)	Gold	30,000^{‡}
United Kingdom (BPI)	Gold	400,000^{‡}
United States (RIAA)	Platinum	1,000,000^{‡}
^{*} Sales figures based on certification alone.^{‡} Sales+streaming figures based on certification alone.

== Release history ==
Region	Date	Format(s)	Label(s)	Ref.
United States	October 14, 2002	Alternative radio	Island	
Japan	November 27, 2002	CD	Island	
United Kingdom	November 30, 2002	CD; cassette	Mercury	
Australia	December 2, 2002	CD	Island	

== Cover versions ==
Since 2025, the song is covered by German electronicore band Electric Callboy in their live shows, featuring Sum 41 drummer Frank Zummo as their touring drummer.
