= Motivation (Sum 41 song) =

Single by Sum 41

from the album All Killer No Filler
- Released: January 5, 2002
- Genre: Pop punk
- Length: 2:52
- Label: Aquarius (Canada); Island (US)
- Songwriters: Deryck Whibley; Greig Nori
- Producer: Jerry Finn

Sum 41 singles chronology
"In Too Deep" (2001)	"Motivation" (2002)	"What We're All About" (2002)

"Motivation" is a song by Canadian rock band Sum 41. It was released on January 5, 2002, as the third single from the album All Killer No Filler. Greig Nori appears on backing vocals.

== Content ==
The song is about being nihilistic, apathetic, demotivated, and being too lazy to look for motivation to do anything.

== Music video ==
The music video is of the band playing in Steve Jocz' attic located in Ajax, Ontario. The room is piled with garbage and other various items.

== Track listing ==
Single version

1. "Motivation"
2. "Crazy Amanda Bunkface"
3. "Pain for Pleasure"
4. "Machine Gun" (Live)
5. "All She's Got" (Live)
6. "Crazy Amanda Bunkface" (Live)
7. "What We're All About" (Live)
8. "Fat Lip" (Video)
9. "In Too Deep" (Video)

EP version

1. Motivation
2. All She's Got (Live)
3. Crazy Amanda Bunkface (Live)
4. What We're All About (Live with Tommy Lee)

== Charts ==
Chart (2002)	Peak position
Ireland (IRMA)	40
Scotland (OCC)	18
UK Singles (OCC)	21
UK Rock & Metal (OCC)	3
US Alternative Airplay (Billboard)	24
