= The Hell Song =

2003 single by Sum 41

Single by Sum 41

from the album Does This Look Infected?
- Released: February 10, 2003
- Studio: Avatar (New York, New York); Metalworks (Mississauga, Ontario)
- Genre: Pop punk
- Length: 3:18
- Label: Aquarius; Island; Mercury
- Songwriters: Greig Nori; Deryck Whibley
- Producer: Greig Nori

Sum 41 singles chronology
"Still Waiting" (2002)	"The Hell Song" (2003)	"Over My Head (Better Off Dead)" (2003)

"The Hell Song" is a song by Canadian rock band Sum 41. The song was released on February 10, 2003, as the second single of the band's album Does This Look Infected?. "The Hell Song" became a top-40 hit in Ireland, Italy, and the United Kingdom. On May 29, 2015, it was certified gold by the Recording Industry Association of America (RIAA).

== Background ==
Deryck Whibley, the lead vocalist of Sum 41, wrote "The Hell Song" after learning that one of his friends had contracted HIV. He said, "That song just came out in, like, half an hour when I just found out," Whibley said. "I wasn't even meaning to write about it, but for some reason that just came out right away". According to former drummer Steve Jocz, as of 2024, the subject of the song was still in good health.

== Music video ==
The video directed by Marc Klasfeld and shot in Los Angeles, features a concert with dolls and action figures, with Sum 41's faces on those "performing" in front of a Lite-Brite screen with the band's name on it. They were joined with other action figures such as those of Snoop Dogg, Eminem, Ozzy Osbourne with his family, Marilyn Manson, Korn, Metallica, Eddie the Head, Gene Simmons, Spice Girls, Angus Young, Jesus Christ, Alice Cooper, Destiny's Child, George W. Bush and Ludacris. The video ends when police dolls arrive to break up the concert, and the band avoids arrest by taking off in a helicopter (which is then comically hurled out of a window and falls to the ground, accompanied by laughter). The dolls' obscene finger gestures and nudity are comically censored, which parodies real life.

The music video was nominated for Best Breakthrough Video & Best Direction at the 2003 MTV Video Music Awards, losing both awards to Coldplay's "The Scientist".

== Track listings ==
UK CD1

1. "The Hell Song" (explicit version)
2. "Over My Head (Better Off Dead)" (demo)
3. "My Direction" (demo)
4. "The Hell Song" (CD-ROM video)

UK CD2

1. "The Hell Song" (live)
2. "Still Waiting" (live)
3. "Rhythms" (live)
4. "The Hell Song" (live CD-ROM video)

UK 7-inch single

A. "The Hell Song" (album version—explicit) – 3:18
B. "Still Waiting" (live from Sound, London) – 2:44

European CD single

1. "The Hell Song"
2. "Over My Head" (demo)

Australian CD single

1. "The Hell Song"
2. "Over My Head" (demo)
3. "My Direction" (demo)
4. "WW7 Pts 1 & 2" (performed by "Pain for Pleasure")

== Charts ==
=== Weekly charts ===
Weekly chart performance for "The Hell Song"
Chart (2003)	Peak position
Australia (ARIA)	76
Belgium (Ultratip Bubbling Under Flanders)	9
Canada (Billboard)	122
Ireland (IRMA)	31
Italy (FIMI)	37
Scottish Singles Sales (Official Charts)	35
UK Singles (Official Charts)	35
UK Rock & Metal (Official Charts)	4
US Alternative Airplay (Billboard)	13

=== Year-end charts ===
Year-end chart performance for "The Hell Song"
Chart (2003)	Position
US Modern Rock Tracks (Billboard)	58

== Certifications ==
Certifications and sales for "The Hell Song"
Region	Certification	Certified units/sales
Italy (FIMI)	Gold	50,000^{‡}
United Kingdom (BPI)	Silver	200,000^{‡}
United States (RIAA)	Gold	500,000^{‡}
^{‡} Sales+streaming figures based on certification alone.

== Release history ==
Release dates and formats for "The Hell Song"
Region	Date	Format(s)	Label(s)	Ref(s).
United Kingdom	February 10, 2003	7-inch vinyl; CD	Mercury	
United States	February 17, 2003	Mainstream rock; active rock; alternative radio	Island	
United States	April 7, 2003	Contemporary hit radio	Island	
Australia	April 14, 2003	CD	Island	
