= Organ Thieves =

Canadian band

- The Organ Thieves perform at the Horseshoe Tavern in October 2009

Background information
- Origin: Toronto, Ontario, Canada
- Genres: Hard rock, southern rock, reggae
- Years active: 2008–2013, 2018
- Label: MapleMusic
- Spinoff of: Brown Brigade
- Members: Chuck Coles; Dave Baksh; Mike Smith; Theo McKibbon
- Past members: Matt Worobec; John Owens; Ben Davies

Organ Thieves is a southern and soul-influenced experimental hard rock side project by Brown Brigade guitarists Chuck Coles and Dave Baksh, formed by Coles in mid-2008. It has since become their main project.

== History ==
=== Formation and God's Favorite Sons (2008–2009) ===
According to Dave Baksh the band "started when guitarist Chuck Coles was getting kind of antsy in Brown Brigade in that he wanted to write – he's a natural songwriter. So one day we were set to play a benefit show in Kitchener/Waterloo but Chuck had already booked an Organ Thieves show, and this is at the time when he was using another drummer other than Johnny [Chuck's former Cauterize co-member Matt Worobec]. Basically I hadn't even seen the band and they asked me to play a Labour Day show with them. After about two weeks of practice me and the drummer at the time, Matt Worobec, had gotten together and played this show. The lineup would have been Ben Davies, Mike Smith, Matt Worobec, Chuck Coles and myself. We pretty much played naked to a bunch of people at a cottage; it was fun." Dave also stated that he joined the band due to the different members and their musical tastes who all influenced the band's unique musical style, which was very different from what Dave used to play in Brown Brigade and Sum 41. Soon, drummer Matt Worobec had to quit the band due to other commitments and was replaced temporarily by Brown Brigade drummer Johnny Owens.

In January 2009, the band entered The Boom Cave, a recording studio in Oshawa, Ontario, owned by Chuck's former Cauterize bandmates Jesse Smith and Jason Bone, to record the band's first EP. The EP, entitled God's Favorite Sons was co-produced by the band, Jesse Smith and Jason Bone, and self-released by the band in March 2009, sold only at their live shows, as well as few local shops around the Ontario area.

The band started playing live shows, playing original songs as well as a lot of punk covers from The Clash and Misfits, which were sung live by guitarist Ben Davies. Not long after, drummer Matt Worobec also returned to the band. In late 2009, Ben Davies left the band, leaving Chuck and Dave the only guitarists.

=== Somewhere Between Free Men and Slaves (2009–2013) ===
Pre-production for the band's first full-length studio album started in late 2009. The album was set to be recorded in early 2010 with a release sometime in mid-to-late 2010, though the recording was delayed. Baksh has said that the album is totally written, with only transitions to songs left to write with Coles updating on the band's Twitter that 21 songs were written. The album will be produced by former Sum 41 associate, producer and manager Greig Nori, who Baksh stated that he'll be happy to work again with. The last time the two had worked together was on Sum 41's Chuck in 2004. Nori has also worked with Coles and Worobec in Cauterize. With the new album, the band states they are "not sure of who we would want to take this to. Right now as it stands our plan is to basically keep going as a band and if somebody comes along that we do want to partner up with in respect to labels, we'll cross that bridge when we come to it."

On October 2, 2010, after spending most of the year demoing songs for the full-length album, and pre-producing them with producer Greig Nori, the band finally entered the studio to start recording and recorded most of the album in 5 days. Recording took place between October 2–7, 2010, in Dave Baksh's BTown Sound studio. Additional recording continued through 2011.

On October 23, 2010, the band played as a guest act at the Horseshoe Tavern in Toronto, Ontario, supporting Gentlemen Husbands' on their EP release show. At this show, drummer Theo McKibbon of The Bad Ideas, who also played the same night, has filled-in for Matt Worobec. Though, a few days after the show, the band's Facebook page was updated with McKibbon's name in the "Band members" section, hinting on him joining the band permanently as Worobec's replacement, though no official announcement from the band has been made. A month later, frontman Chuck Coles has confirmed that drummer Matt Worobec decided to leave the band for personal reasons, and that Theo McKibbon is indeed his official replacement.

In May 2011, the band entered Coalition Studio to re-record some songs and do some additional recordings. It was then announced that the album, to be titled Somewhere Between Free Men and Slaves, is set to be released in summer 2011, but it since has been delayed to an unspecified date. On November 21, 2011, Dave Baksh has announced through a fansite that the band has signed with MapleMusic Recordings in Canada. In January 2012, it was announced through a Canadian press sheet that the band's debut full-length album Somewhere Between Free Men and Slaves would be finally released on April 24, 2012 through MapleMusic Recordings, and supported by a single show in Toronto, Ontario on March 21, supporting the recently reunited Treble Charger. On April 3, 2012, the band released the debut single off their debut album, "Phoebe", through iTunes.

=== Reformation (2018) ===
On September 23, 2018, lead guitarist Dave Baksh uploaded a video on his Facebook page, also featuring lead singer and guitarist Chuck Coles, announcing the band will be playing their first show together in five years on November 7, 2018, at the Horseshoe Tavern in Toronto, Ontario in support of Story Book Farm Primate Sanctuary.

== Musical style ==
The band's musical style is unique and although the music is mainly considered hard rock, southern rock and reggae rock, the band like to call themselves "experimental-soul-rock". The band's music takes influences from various genres including reggae, soul, country, blues, rhythm and blues, folk, rock and roll, punk, heavy metal, southern rock and more, as stated by the band that they are not limited to any genre and are willing to experiment everything.

They are influenced by a variety of bands ranging from The Clash, Nirvana, and Blind Melon to Tom Waits, Grand Funk Railroad, and the Pixies. Other influences include The Replacements, Joe Strummer, King Tubby, Bad Religion, James Brown, Anthrax, Public Enemy, Kool Keith, and Max Romeo. They are also known to play many different cover songs live, mostly songs by such punk bands The Clash and The Misfits but also such diverse artists as Steve Earle and B-52's.

== Band members ==
=== Final line-up ===
- Chuck Coles – lead vocals, guitar (2008–2013)
- Dave Baksh – guitar, backing vocals (2008–2013)
- Mike Smith – bass (2008–2013)
- Theo McKibbon – drums, percussion (2010–2013)

=== Former members ===
- Matt Worobec – drums, percussion (2008, 2009–2010)
- John Owens – drums, percussion (2008–2009)
- Ben Davies – guitar, mandolin, occasional lead vocals (2008–2009)

== Discography ==
=== Studio albums ===
- 2012 – Somewhere Between Free Men and Slaves

=== Extended plays ===
Year	Album details
2009	God's Favorite Sons: Released: 2009; Label: Self-released; Formats: Digital download

=== Singles ===
Year	Song	Peak chart positions	Album
Year	Song	CAN Rock	Album
2012	"Phoebe"	33	Somewhere Between Free Men and Slaves
