= The Operation M.D. =

Canadian garage rock band

- Origin: Ajax, Ontario, Canada; Los Angeles, California, U.S.
- Genres: Garage rock; garage punk
- Years active: 2006–present
- Labels: Aquarius; Mouth to Mouth Music
- Spinoff of: Sum 41; H_{2}O; Juliette and the Licks
- Members: Todd Morse; Jason McCaslin

The Operation M.D. (formerly The Operation) is a Canadian-American garage rock supergroup created by Doctor Dynamite (Jason McCaslin of Sum 41) and Doctor Rocco (Todd Morse of H_{2}O) as a side project to their other bands. The band's debut album, We Have an Emergency, was released in February 2007 by Aquarius Records. Their second album Birds + Bee Stings was self-released by the band's own label "Mouth To Mouth Music" in June 2010.

== History ==
McCaslin and Morse met one another as their bands Sum 41 and H_{2}O toured during the 2001 Warped Tour. The two came up with a medical theme for their band and assumed the aliases of Dr. Dynamite (McCaslin) and Dr. Rocco (Morse) under the name The Operation. After signing with Aquarius Records the band added "M.D." to their name for legal reasons. The band's debut album, We Have an Emergency, was recorded during the summer of 2006, when Sum 41 was on hiatus, and was released on February 20, 2007, in Canada with two music videos made for the songs "Sayanora" and "Someone Like You", with both videos being directed by Sum 41 drummer Steve Jocz (Dr. Dinero). Though the band has said many times they don't plan to tour or to play live shows with this project, they did however play one special show at the Bovine Sex Club in Toronto, Ontario, in August 2008. On April 18, 2008, the album was also released in Japan.

Recording for the band's second album began on September 15, 2008. It was recorded in Johnny Land Studios and in Cone's house in Toronto, Ontario, as well as in an abandoned home studio in Ajax, Ontario, which was called by the band the "Boehlke's Bunkhouse". The album's recording was finished in April 2009, and it was mixed and mastered by June 2009.

On May 18, 2010, the band released a new song entitled "We Stand" on their Myspace page. The song was a charity single the band recorded for a Canadian charity compilation called Song for Africa – Rwanda: Rises Up! which was released on June 22, 2010. The second album's first single "Buried at Sea" which was produced by Ian D'sa of Billy Talent (the rest of the album was produced by Cone + Todd) was released on June 10, 2010, with the album, entitled Birds + Bee Stings being released a few weeks later, on June 29, 2010, through the band's own label Mouth to Mouth Music, with a worldwide digital release only.

On October 5, 2010, the band has announced on their Twitter that they are working to book some live shows in support of the new album, around the Christmas time.

On October 28, 2010, The band has announced that they will be re-releasing their second album Birds + Bee Stings in a physical CD release in Canada on November 30, 2010. The album was previously only available as a worldwide digital release, but now will be also available in stores, as well as on the Canadian iTunes, along with a new artwork. The new release was supported by a single show at the Horseshoe Tavern in Toronto, Ontario, Canada, on December 21, 2010, with Matt Brann on drums.

On July 24, 2011, it was mentioned on the band's Twitter that there has been talks to shoot a new music video by the band. On July 29, 2011, Todd Morse has leaked info on his Twitter page about an upcoming previously unreleased single, entitled "Like Everyone Else", which will be released on iTunes in a few months.

On September 2, 2011, Todd Morse has revealed in an interview that the band plan to go on their first European tour, which will also be their first tour ever, in December, possibly with Tom Thacker of Sum 41 and Gob on lead guitar. Morse has also confirmed that the band plan to release the new single "Like Everyone Else" on Christmas, along with an accompanying music video. The song, which was written entirely by Jason McCaslin, is a leftover from the sessions for the band's Birds + Bee Stings album, and was also considered for inclusion on the Sum 41 album Screaming Bloody Murder, but it was eventually decided to release it as a stand-alone Operation M.D. single. Todd has also commented that the band will be releasing a third album, though it is unknown when work on the new album will begin.

On July 28, 2015, the band announced that mixing for their single "Like Everyone Else" has begun. On September 25, 2015, "Like Everyone Else" was officially released as a stand-alone single on iTunes. The song was originally written by Jason McCaslin for the band's second album back in 2010, and was later being considered for inclusion on Sum 41's 2011 effort Screaming Bloody Murder.

On February 1, 2016, the band announced they're mastering their newest single "Little Miss Takes", the song being a b-side recorded originally for their first album in 2006.

On November 13, 2017, after almost two years of silence, the band announced on their Facebook they'll be releasing a new single on December 1. On December 1, 2017, "Little Miss Takes" was officially released as a stand-alone single on iTunes. The song is a reworked version of a demo the band released on their Myspace page back in 2007. The single is the first to feature the band's friend and former Sum 41 drummer Steve Jocz on drumming duties, since recording drums for their first album.

== Band members ==
Official members

- Todd Morse (as Dr. Rocco) – vocals, guitar, keyboards (2006–present)
- Jason McCaslin (as Dr. Dynamite) – bass, guitar, vocals, keyboards (2006–present)

Contributing members

- Steve Jocz (as Dr. Dinero) – drums (2008–2013, 2017; as session and touring member)
- Matt Brann (as Dr. Space) – drums (2006–2008; as session and touring member)
- Jason Womack (as Dr. Wo) – guitar (2007–2008; as touring member)
- Adam Blake (as Dr. London) – guitar (2007; as touring member)
- Deryck Whibley (as Dr. Jack)- guitar, keyboards (2008–2013; as session and touring member)
- John-Angus MacDonald (as Dr. Trew) – guitar, backing vocals (2008; as touring member)
- Todd Friend (as Dr. Simpson) – drums (2008; as touring member)
- Ian D'Sa (as Dr. Sauce) – guitar, backing vocals (2012–2013; as session and touring member)

== Discography ==
=== Studio albums ===
- 2007: We Have an Emergency – Aquarius Records
- 2010: Birds + Bee Stings

=== Singles ===
- 2014: "Shake Your Cage"
- 2015: "Like Everyone Else"
- 2017: "Little Miss Takes"
- 2019: "No Walk Zone"

=== Compilation appearances ===
- 2010: Song for Africa – Rwanda: Rises Up! – The song "We Stand"
