= Half Hour of Power =

EP by Sum 41
- Released: June 13, 2000
- Recorded: 2000
- Studios: Metalworks, Mississauga, Ontario
- Genres: Pop-punk; skate punk
- Length: 30:00
- Labels: Island; Big Rig; Aquarius
- Producers: Greig Nori; Deryck Whibley

Sum 41 chronology
1998 Demo Tape (1998)	Half Hour of Power (2000)	All Killer No Filler (2001)

Singles from Half Hour of Power
- 1. "Makes No Difference" Released: July 11, 2000

Half Hour of Power is the debut extended play (Note: Some sources consider Half Hour of Power a studio album and other sources consider it an extended play.) by Canadian rock band Sum 41. It was released on June 27, 2000, on Aquarius Records (Canada), and Big Rig Records, a subsidiary of Island Records (United States).

== Background ==
Though officially an EP, Half Hour of Power may also be considered the band's debut studio album. Most of the songs featured on the EP were included as bonus tracks on Sum 41's actual debut studio album All Killer No Filler (2001), which featured a re-recorded version of Half Hour of Power's sixth track "Summer". This is the second of three times that this song was featured on a Sum 41 album. It first appeared on their 1998 demo tape.

== Music ==
Critics have categorized Half Hour of Power as pop-punk and skate punk. The songs "Grab the Devil by the Horns and Fuck Him Up the Ass" and "Ride the Chariot to the Devil", are heavy metal songs, similar to Iron Maiden. Although "Another Time Around" was described as punk rock, the song's intro was described as "dirge-metal". The song "Second Chance for Max Headroom" bears similarities to American punk rock band NOFX and contains a ska section. The song "Dave's Possessed Hair/It's What We're All About" is known for containing a part with elements of hip-hop.

== Critical reception ==
Professional ratings
Review scores
Source	Rating
AllMusic	3/5 stars

Curtis Zimmermann of AllMusic stated that "The first track, "Grab the Devil by the Horns and Fuck Him up the Ass," is a time warp. For a minute and a half the group relives the new wave of British metal and cranks out an Iron Maiden style tune. After a brief trip down memory lane the album quickly morphs into pop punk. The songs are well crafted and the hooks are catchy on "Make No Difference" and "Summer." But in some respects that is problematic, there was a time in the pre-Green Day/Blink-182 years where punk defined itself by not being radio friendly. A good album, but essentially proof that turn of the millennium punk is just as much a corporate rock entity as adult contemporary."

== Track listing ==
Writing credits taken from ASCAP.

No.	Title	Writer(s)	Length
1.	"Grab the Devil by the Horns and Fuck Him Up the Ass" (Instrumental)	Deryck Whibley, Steve Jocz, Dave Baksh, Jason McCaslin	1:07
2.	"Machine Gun"	Whibley	2:29
3.	"What I Believe"	Whibley, Greig Nori	2:50
4.	"T.H.T."	Whibley	0:44
5.	"Makes No Difference"	Whibley, Nori	3:10
6.	"Summer"	Whibley, Nori	2:40
7.	"32 Ways to Die" (Instrumental)	Jocz	1:31
8.	"Second Chance for Max Headroom"	Whibley	3:51
9.	"Dave's Possessed Hair" / "It's What We're All About"	Whibley, Baksh / Whibley, Jocz, Baksh, Shawn Moltke	3:48
10.	"Ride the Chariot to the Devil" (Instrumental)	Whibley, Baksh	0:55
11.	"Another Time Around" (Actual song ends at 3:22 with added silence afterwards bringing the EP's length to 30 minutes)	Whibley, Nori	6:52
Total length:			29:57

== Personnel ==
Adapted from the EP's liner notes.

Sum 41

- Deryck "Bizzy D" Whibley – lead vocals, rhythm guitar, rapping on "It's What We're All About"
- Dave "Hot Chocolate" Baksh - lead guitar, backing vocals, rapping on It's What We're All About"
- Jason "Cone" McCaslin – bass
- Steve "Stevo 32" Jocz – drums, rapping on "It's What We're All About"

Additional musicians

- Sarah McElcheran, Steven Donald - horns on "Second Chance for Max Headroom"
- MC Shan - rap vocals on "It's What We're All About"

== Charts ==
Chart (2000–2001)	Peak position
Japanese Albums (Oricon)	62
UK Albums (OCC)	143
UK Rock & Metal Albums (OCC)	18
US Heatseekers Albums (Billboard)	36
US Billboard 200	176

== Certifications ==
Certifications for Half Hour of Power
Region	Certification	Certified units/sales
Canada (Music Canada)	Gold	50,000^{^}
United Kingdom (BPI)	Silver	60,000^{^}
^{^} Shipments figures based on certification alone.
