= Does This Look Infected? =

Studio album by Sum 41
- Released: November 26, 2002
- Recorded: 2002
- Studios: Avatar (New York, New York); Metalworks (Mississauga, Ontario)
- Genres: Punk rock; pop-punk; heavy metal; melodic hardcore
- Length: 31:06; 39:18 (United Kingdom Edition)
- Labels: Aquarius; Island; Mercury
- Producer: Greig Nori

Sum 41 chronology
| All Killer No Filler (2001) | Does This Look Infected? (2002) | Chuck (2004) |

Singles from Does This Look Infected?
- 1. "Still Waiting" Released: November 18, 2002; 2. "The Hell Song" Released: February 18, 2003; 3. "Over My Head (Better Off Dead)" Released: June 23, 2003

Does This Look Infected? is the second studio album by Canadian rock band Sum 41. It was released on November 26, 2002.

== Music ==
=== Composition ===
The album is more aggressive, darker and heavier and has fewer elements of pop music than Sum 41's previous studio album, All Killer No Filler (2001) PopMatters writer Ethan Stewart described Does This Look Infected? stylistically as a "transitional record" between the pop-punk of All Killer No Filler and the heavy metal sound of Chuck, as well as "the band's most varied album". It includes both pop punk tracks, such as "Hyper-Insomnia-Para-Condrioid" and "The Hell Song" and melodic thrash metal songs such as "Still Waiting". Many songs incorporating elements of both genres, such as shouted vocals, breakdowns, harmonized guitars and riffs typical of thrash metal, as well as melodies indebted to pop punk and sometimes a more jovial tone.

Critics have categorized the album as punk rock, pop-punk, heavy metal and melodic hardcore. The album uses elements of hardcore punk, thrash metal, horror punk, hard rock and D-beat. Alternative Press consider it a "scene album".

Ultimate Guitar editor Jorge Martins described the album, as well as its follow up, as "fantastic examples" of merging "pop punk with thrash, NWOBHM, and alt-metal" and the band in general as a band who "perfected the art of combining punk rock and metal". The song "Thanks for Nothing" also includes elements of hip-hop. Although the album has been described as pop punk by some sources, Counterculture.co.uk considered it an album that shows Sum 41 abandoning the pop punk genre for a more standard punk rock style. Amy Sciarretto of ARTISTdirect wrote that Does This Look Infected? soldifies Sum 41 as "true punk stalwarts". The music on Does This Look Infected? has been compared to bands such as the Offspring, P.O.D., Metallica, Rancid, Iron Maiden, Judas Priest, Bad Religion, NOFX, Green Day and Blink-182. Additionally, the track "Mr. Amsterdam" has drawn comparisons to the music on the album Waking the Fallen by Avenged Sevenfold, which was released the following year. The track "Billy Spleen" has drawn comparisons to post-hardcore bands Fugazi and Quicksand.

=== Lyrics ===
The album's lyrical topics are darker than the lyrical topics on All Killer No Filler. Sum 41's vocalist/rhythm guitarist Deryck Whibley said, "A lot of stuff happened in the past year that opened our eyes to new things," Whibley said. "The whole last year has been really crazy around the world. There's been so much stuff going on and it's been so televised. I think we've all become more aware. When we were writing the last record everything was happy go lucky. Now this time we've seen a little bit more and our eyes have been opened up a little bit." The album's lyrical topics include hatred, war, internal demons, disliking the world, suicide, drugs, insomnia and HIV. The song "Mr. Amsterdam" is about an embittered man. Whibley said, "'Mr. Amsterdam' is sort of about a guy who hates everything, very bitter person who kind of hates the world." He explains, "He's against the world." The song is also about the complacency of pop culture in 2002, the year that Does This Look Infected? was released, and technology that was new during the year that the album was released. Whibley explained the meaning of "Mr. Amsterdam", saying, "We depend so much on new technology to make sure that we don't have to do anything. Everything's being laid out so we can sit at home and do nothing and never leave our homes. You can order all your groceries from the computer. You can do anything you want. You can just sit there and become fatter. And I think that's bad."

Lead guitarist Dave "Brownsound" Baksh explained the meaning of the song "All Messed Up", saying, "There's a song called 'All Messed Up,' which is about doing drugs . . . just what we feel when we're on drugs." When Whibley spoke about "All Messed Up", he said, "It's about those kinds of nights. It's just about being really messed up and in that whole cracked-out kind of state." "The Hell Song" is about a friend of Sum 41 who contracted HIV. Whibley spoke about "The Hell Song" saying, "It’s one of my favorite songs on the record. It's about this girl I used to date who I've known forever. Just last Christmas she found that she was HIV positive, and it was so brutal. She doesn't sleep around. She's only had two or three boyfriends and one of them used to cheat on her all the time, and then he got it and gave it to her. It's the heaviest thing that's happened in our group of friends." "No Brains" is about a former band member of Sum 41. Whibley explained the song's meaning, saying, "That's just a basic 'fuck you, I'm done' kind of song. This guy was our old singer and I was best friends with him. We had this big falling out." Whibley explained what the song "Over My Head (Better Off Dead)" is about. He said, "It's not about being fucked up or drunk. It's more about the aftermath when you're hearing everything you've just done the night before, and you're like, "Ah, fuck, I'm better off dead." I don't regret any of the things I do and I don't mind doing them, I just hate hearing about it. Being told every morning, "Dude, what did you do last night?" drives me nuts."

"Still Waiting" was written after the September 11 attacks. Whibley explained the meaning of the song, saying, "It's not directly about 9/11 or the war on terrorism. It's about the war on everything. It's about the world as we know it. It's no secret that the world doesn't get along and there's all this hatred. It's everything to do with how this world functions." Whibley stated on the band's DVD, Sake Bombs And Happy Endings, that the album's song "A.N.I.C." is a "special love song" dedicated to Anna Nicole Smith. According to him, "A.N.I.C." stands for 'Anna Nicole is a Cunt'." Lead guitarist Dave "Brownsound" Baksh said that Anna Nicole Smith is "a fuckin' loser" and also said, "Look what she's doing to herself." Sum 41 stopped including the song in their live performances after Smith died of an overdose in 2007.

== Artwork and title ==
The cover for Does This Look Infected? shows drummer Steve Jocz dressed as a zombie. It was chosen months before the title. The album's release was almost delayed because the band members did not have a name for it on time until Whibley thought of the name Does This Look Infected?. The whole band laughed at the idea and chose it. The back cover for the album artwork depicts the entire band in full zombie makeup next to a tombstone. The same idea was also used on the band's EP Does This Look Infected Too?, except Jocz was replaced with Whibley, also dressed as a zombie.

== Reception ==
Professional ratings
Aggregate scores
| Source | Rating |
|---|---|
| Metacritic | 75/100 |
Review scores
| Source | Rating |
| AllMusic | 3/5 stars |
| Blender | 4/5 stars |
| Dotmusic | 4/5 stars |
| E! | B+ |
| Entertainment Weekly | B− |
| The Guardian | 2/5 stars |
| NME | 7/10 |
| Playlouder | 3.5/5 stars |
| Q | 4/5 stars |
| Rolling Stone | 3/5 stars |

=== Critical reception ===
Does This Look Infected? has received mostly positive reviews from music critics. On Metacritic, the album has 75 out of 100. E! Online said that it "has a clutch of songs that mix chord-y abandon with raging rock riffs--and a heck of a lot of good times". Blender also gave it a positive review, saying, "So Sum 41 have grown up... a little.... It's all relative, and, crucially, it still rocks."

=== Commercial performance ===
Does This Look Infected? debuted at number eight on the Canadian Albums Chart, selling 17,000 copies in Canada in its first week. The album gained commercial success, with singles "The Hell Song" and "Still Waiting" mainly gaining success on the modern rock charts. The album has since sold over 4.5 million copies worldwide, but the album did not have as much success as the band's previous album "All Killer No Filler".

=== Legacy ===
The album was included at number 28 on Rock Sound's "The 51 Most Essential Pop Punk Albums of All Time" list. The band toured to celebrate its 10th anniversary in 2012, and its 15th anniversary in 2018, playing the album in its entirety. Whibley himself stated he was not satisfied with how the album was mixed, stating "I’ve always, always hated the way this album sounds. I hated it in the studio and it still bothers me. The demo I made myself at home sounded better than the final mix." In February 2025, former drummer Steve Jocz ranked Does This Look Infected? as his favorite Sum 41 album he has worked on.

== Track listing ==
| No. | Title | Writer(s) | Length |
|---|---|---|---|
| 1. | "The Hell Song" | Deryck Whibley | 3:18 |
| 2. | "Over My Head (Better Off Dead)" | Whibley; Steve Jocz | 2:29 |
| 3. | "My Direction" | Whibley; Dave Baksh | 2:03 |
| 4. | "Still Waiting" | Whibley | 2:39 |
| 5. | "A.N.I.C." | Whibley | 0:38 |
| 6. | "No Brains" | Whibley; Jocz; Baksh | 2:46 |
| 7. | "All Messed Up" | Whibley; Baksh | 2:45 |
| 8. | "Mr. Amsterdam" | Whibley | 2:56 |
| 9. | "Thanks for Nothing" | Whibley; Jocz | 3:04 |
| 10. | "Hyper-Insomnia-Para-Condrioid" | Whibley; Jocz; Baksh | 2:33 |
| 11. | "Billy Spleen" | Whibley; Jason McCaslin | 2:33 |
| 12. | "Hooch" | Whibley; Jocz; Baksh; McCaslin | 3:28 |
| Total length: | | | 31:06 |

UK and SRC Vinyl bonus tracks
| No. | Title | Writer(s) | Length |
|---|---|---|---|
| 13. | "Reign in Pain (Heavy Metal Jamboree)" (vinyl pressing is listed as "Reign in Pain") | Jocz; Baksh | 2:55 |
| 14. | "WWVII Parts 1 & 2" (vinyl pressing is listed as "WWVII Part II") | Jocz; Baksh | 5:09 |
| Total length: | | | 39:18 |

Does This Look Infected Too? – Japanese tour edition bonus disc
| No. | Title | Length |
|---|---|---|
| 1. | "Mr. Amsterdam" (live in Brussels) | 3:54 |
| 2. | "Over My Head (Better Off Dead)" (live in Brussels) | 2:56 |
| 3. | "No Brains" (live in Brussels) | 4:08 |
| 4. | "The Hell Song" (live in Brussels) | 3:08 |
| 5. | "Still Waiting" (live in Brussels) | 3:16 |
| Total length: | | 17:22 |

=== Bonus DVD ===
The unedited version includes a bonus DVD which is entitled Cross The T's and Gouge Your I's. The DVD has footage of Sum 41's alter ego band, Pain for Pleasure, titled "Reign in Pain", as well as various humorous segments like "Going Going Gonorrhea", "Campus Invasion" and "Pizza Heist and Other Crap". Also included in the DVD are the Pain for Pleasure tracks "Reign in Pain" and "WWVII Parts 1 & 2", the Autopilot Off songs "Long Way to Fall" and "Nothing Frequency", the No Warning songs "Short Fuse" and "Ill Blood", and some web-links.

== Personnel ==
Sum 41

- Deryck Whibley – lead vocals, rhythm guitar; drums on "Reign in Pain (Heavy Metal Jamboree)" and "WWVII Parts 1 & 2"
- Dave "Brownsound" Baksh – lead guitar, backing vocals
- Jason "Cone" McCaslin – bass
- Steve "Stevo32" Jocz – drums; lead vocals on "Reign in Pain (Heavy Metal Jamboree)" and "WWVII Parts 1 & 2"; rapping on "Thanks for Nothing"

Production

- Greig Nori – producer
- Ben Sanders – additional vocal recording assistant
- Ian Bodzasi – assistant engineer
- Steve Chawley – assistant engineer
- Chris Gordon – assistant engineer, additional engineer
- Brian Montgomery – assistant engineer
- Ross Petersen – assistant engineer
- Anthony Ruotolo – assistant engineer
- Owen Tamplin – assistant engineer
- Phil Wakeford – assistant engineer
- Josh Wilbur – Pro Tools engineer
- Ed Krautner – engineer, additional engineering and mixing
- Femio Hernandez – additional engineer
- Joel Kazmi – additional engineer
- L. Stuart Young – additional engineer
- Dan Moyse – drum technician
- Artie Smith – guitar technician
- Tony Vanias – recording administration
- Andy Wallace – mixing
- Steve Sisco – mixing assistant
- Tom Lord-Alge– mixing on "The Hell Song"
- Howie Weinberg – mastering at Masterdisk, New York City
- Bernadette Walsh – production coordinator
- Morning Breath – album design
- Jonathan Mannion – photography

== Charts ==
=== Weekly charts ===
Weekly chart performance for Does This Look Infected?
| Chart (2002–03) | Peak position |
|---|---|
| Australian Albums (ARIA) | 56 |
| Austrian Albums (Ö3 Austria) | 49 |
| Belgian Albums (Ultratop Flanders) | 49 |
| Belgian Albums (Ultratop Wallonia) | 49 |
| Canadian Albums (Billboard) | 8 |
| French Albums (SNEP) | 28 |
| German Albums (Offizielle Top 100) | 58 |
| Irish Albums (IRMA) | 29 |
| Italian Albums (FIMI) | 47 |
| Scottish Albums (Official Charts) | 34 |
| Swedish Albums (Sverigetopplistan) | 41 |
| Swiss Albums (Schweizer Hitparade) | 17 |
| UK Albums (Official Charts) | 39 |
| UK Rock & Metal Albums (Official Charts) | 5 |
| US Billboard 200 | 32 |

=== Year-end charts ===
2002 year-end chart performance for Does This Look Infected?
| Chart (2002) | Position |
|---|---|
| Canadian Albums (Billboard) | 68 |
| Canadian Alternative Albums (Billboard) | 20 |
| UK Albums (OCC) | 179 |

2003 year-end chart performance for Does This Look Infected?
| Chart (2003) | Position |
|---|---|
| US Billboard 200 | 139 |

== Certifications ==
Certifications and sales for Does This Look Infected?
| Region | Certification | Certified units/sales |
|---|---|---|
| Canada (Music Canada) | Platinum | 100,000^{^} |
| Denmark (IFPI Danmark) | Gold | 10,000^{‡} |
| France (SNEP) | Gold | 100,000^{*} |
| Italy (FIMI) | Gold | 25,000^{‡} |
| Japan (RIAJ) | Platinum | 200,000^{^} |
| Switzerland (IFPI Switzerland) | Gold | 20,000^{^} |
| United Kingdom (BPI) | Gold | 100,000^{*} |
| United States (RIAA) | Gold | 613,000 |
^{*} Sales figures based on certification alone.^{^} Shipments figures based on certification alone.^{‡} Sales+streaming figures based on certification alone.
