= Brown Brigade =

Canadian metal band

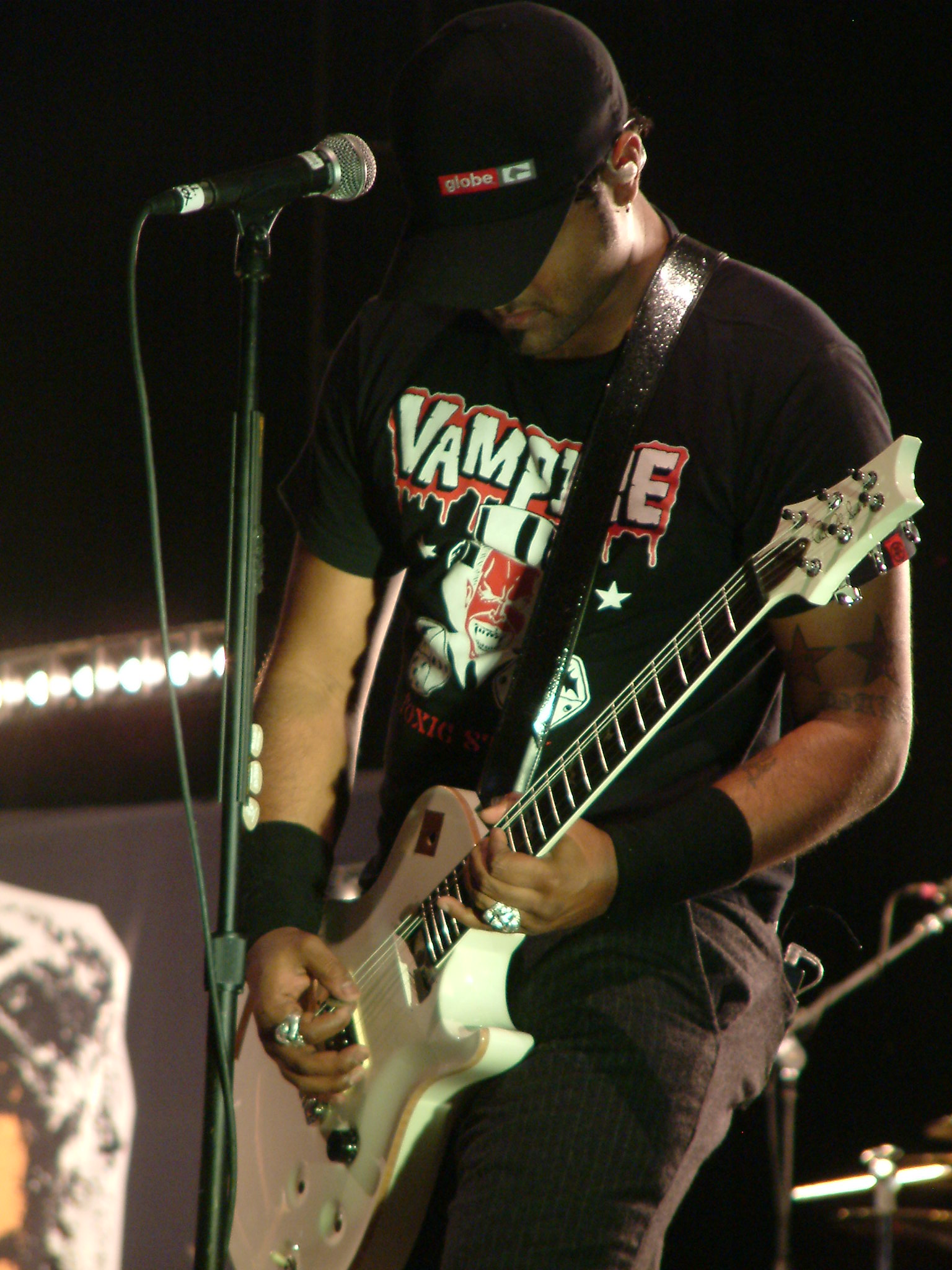
- Guitarist Dave Baksh performing in 2003

Background information
- Origin: Ontario, Canada
- Genres: Heavy metal; reggae rock; thrash metal
- Years active: 2003; 2006–2009
- Label: Aquarius
- Spinoffs: Sum 41
- Spinoff of: Organ Thieves
- Past members: Dave Baksh; Vaughn Lal; Johnny Owens; Chuck Coles; Cess Rock; Craig Pattison; Travis Sanders; Lee Fairley

Brown Brigade was a reggae-influenced heavy metal band created by Sum 41 guitarist Dave "Brownsound" Baksh. The band's final lineup was Baksh (vocals, guitar), Vaughn Lal (bass guitar, backing vocals), Johnny Owens (drums), Chuck Coles (guitar), and Cess Rock (percussion).

== History ==
Baksh formed Brown Brigade as a side-project with his cousin Vaughn Lal in 2003; the band kept a low profile until May 2006, when Baksh left Sum 41 to develop Brown Brigade.

Baksh recruited drummer Johnny Owens, guitarist Craig "The Craigulator" Pattison (Baksh's guitar tech with Sum 41), and percussionist Cess Rock, and chose a mascot, "The Brown Knight", which later appeared in the band's music video for "Aggravation Plantation".

The band was signed to Aquarius Records in September 2006, and in October released a debut EP title Appetizer for Destruction, a reference to the Guns N' Roses album Appetite for Destruction. The EP was sold exclusively on the band's live shows supporting Pennywise on their Canadian tour.

In March 2007, Brown Brigade recorded a thirteen-track album which was mixed in Los Angeles. In July, a promotional cover song from the album, Iron Maiden's "Hallowed Be Thy Name" was released by the fansite There is no Resolution. In August, the album Into the Mouth of Badd(d)ness was released in the United States and Canada through iTunes, and the next month the CD version was released in Canada through Aquarius Records.

In September 2007, guitarist Chuck Coles, formerly of the pop punk band Cauterize, joined the band as a second guitarist, after the departure of guitarist Craig Pattison.

In 2008, Coles, Baksh and Owens formed the band Organ Thieves. Plans were made to release new material online but this didn't happen and the band broke up in November 2009. Baksh rejoined Sum 41 in 2015.

== Band members ==
- Dave "Brownsound" Baksh – guitar, percussion (2003, 2006–2009), lead vocals (2006–2009)
- Vaughn Lal – bass, backing vocals (2003, 2006–2009)
- Johnny "No-Triggers" Owens – drums, percussion (2006–2009)
- Chuck Coles – lead & rhythm guitars (2007–2009)
- Cess Rock – vocals, live percussion (2006–2009)
- Craig Pattison – lead guitar (2003, 2006–2007)
- Travis Sanders – lead vocals (2006)
- Lee Fairley – drums (2006)

== Discography ==
Release date	Title	Record label
November 2006	Appetizer for Destruction (EP)	Aquarius Records
August 14, 2007	Into the Mouth of Badd(d)ness	Aquarius Records
