= Chuck Coles =

Canadian musician

- Birth name: Charles Coles
- Born: March 20, 1980 (age 45)
- Origin: Oshawa, Ontario, Canada
- Genres: Punk rock, heavy metal, rock n' roll, psychobilly, alternative rock, southern rock, reggae
- Occupation: Musician
- Instrument(s): Guitar, vocals
- Years active: 2005–present

Chuck Coles (born March 20, 1980) is a Canadian musician. He was the guitarist for heavy metal band Brown Brigade and the lead singer, guitarist, and bandleader for The Organ Thieves.

== Career ==
Before joining Brown Brigade, Coles was a member of Canadian pop punk band Cauterize from 2005 to when it disbanded in 2007; he played his last show with Cauterize on October 19, 2007, while already a member of Brown Brigade. With Cauterize, he played on the albums Paper Wings (2005), and Disguises (2007) with its added acoustic EP Unmasked. Coles's addition to the band as lead guitarist provided for stronger three-guitar melodies on Disguises, particularly on the re-release of Closer. Prior to joining Cauterize, he played in local punk, hip-hop, reggae band Murder Culture.

Coles formed the southern/hard rock band The Organ Thieves with Brown Brigade band-member Dave Baksh and former Cauterize band-member Matt Worobec. Coles sings lead vocals, plays lead guitar, and writes most of the lyrics and guitar melodies for the band. The Organ Thieves released their first EP, God's Favorite Sons, in March 2009.

In 2013, Coles has joined Burlington, Ontario based punk/psychobilly band The Creepshow as lead guitarist.

In 2017, Coles did a small southern Ontario solo tour opening for Against Me!. Currently he fronts his own solo act – Chuck Coles and the United Snakes.
