= Fat Lip =

2001 single by Sum 41

Single by Sum 41

from the album All Killer No Filler
- Released: April 3, 2001
- Genre: Pop-punk; skate punk; rap rock
- Length: 2:58
- Label: Island
- Songwriters: Deryck Whibley; Steve Jocz; Dave Baksh; Greig Nori
- Producer: Jerry Finn

Sum 41 singles chronology
"Makes No Difference" (2000)	"Fat Lip" (2001)	"In Too Deep" (2001)

Audio sample
- "Fat Lip": file; help

Music video
- "Fat Lip" on YouTube

"Fat Lip" is a song by Canadian rock band Sum 41. It is the fourth track on their debut album, All Killer No Filler (2001), and was released as the lead single in April 2001. It is the band's most successful single to date, topping the Billboard Modern Rock Tracks chart. It peaked at number 66 on the Billboard Hot 100 chart and at number eight on the UK Singles Chart.

== Background and composition ==
"Fat Lip" was written by Sum 41 members Deryck Whibley, Steve Jocz and Dave Brownsound, and in-house producer Greig Nori, with production by Jerry Finn. The song gets its title from the slang term for a swollen lip as a result of being punched in the face.

"It was the last song I had written for All Killer [No Filler]," Whibley told Stereogum in 2021. "The whole album was pretty much done. It was never meant to be a single. It wasn't even supposed to be a song. The very, very first thing I wrote was the guitar riff. And I didn't necessarily write it for this idea that I had for this sort of punk rock-rap kind of thing. I knew I had this old school rap idea mixed with punk rock sort of stuff, but I wrote this riff just as a riff. And then I ended up writing a chorus, like, months later. And then I had this verse. And none of them were supposed to be together. They were just separate things that I was writing over time. And then one day it kind of clicked, and I thought, 'Well, these all kind of work. They're all around the same tempo, they're all the same key.' I changed a few things and made it work, now all of a sudden I was like, 'OK, I've got the rap part, I've got a riff, and I've got a chorus.' But I don’t have the rest of the song. And then it took a long time before pieces just kind of came together."

The uptempo song has been described as pop punk, skate punk, rap rock and easycore, with Whibley, Brownsound, and Jocz sharing vocal duties. "The verses are really about what we do: growing up in the suburbs, going to parties and hanging out with our friends, and causing trouble. A lot of people say they relate to it," said Whibley. Brian Hiatt of MTV.com described the song as "pop-punk-meets-hip-hop", Loudwire cited it as a containing elements of hard rock and PopMatters cited it as using elements of heavy metal. The song has also been described to be "Mixing elements of skate punk, nu-metal, and good old-fashioned pop."

== Music video ==
The music video was directed by Marc Klasfeld and was shot on March 6–7, 2001. The song topped MTV's Total Request Live and MuchMusic's MuchMusic Countdown in mid-2001. In the original Canadian version, the music video combines with fellow All Killer No Filler track "Pain for Pleasure", a very short Iron Maiden-esque song which is the final song on the album. The video, filmed in Pomona, California, was ranked at number 75 on MuchMusic's 100 Best Videos. At the beginning of the music video, the band performs an a cappella of the first half of the first verse of "What We're All About"—which would be their future single— with Jason McCaslin beatboxing for the staff of a liquor store.

== Live performances ==
The song was performed on Saturday Night Live on October 6, 2001, hosted by Seann William Scott.

== Track listings ==
Canadian, European and Australian CD single

1. "Fat Lip" – 3:02
2. "Makes No Difference" – 3:10
3. "What I Believe" – 2:49
4. "Machine Gun" – 2:29

European 2-track CD single

1. "Fat Lip" – 3:02
2. "Makes No Difference" – 3:10

European 5-track CD single

1. "Fat Lip" - 3:02
2. "T.H.T. (Tables Have Turned)" - 0:43
3. "Makes No Difference" - 3:10
4. "What I Believe" - 2:49
5. "Machine Gun" - 2:29

UK CD single

1. "Fat Lip" (radio/clean edit) – 3:02
2. "Crazy Amanda Bunkface" (live)
3. "Machine Gun" (live)
4. "Fat Lip" (CD-ROM video)

UK cassette single

1. "Fat Lip" (radio/clean edit)
2. "Crazy Amanda Bunkface" (live)

UK and European DVD single

1. "Fat Lip" (video)
2. "Pain for Pleasure" (audio)
3. "Meet the Pain" (video)

== Personnel ==
- Deryck "Bizzy D" Whibley – lead vocals, rhythm guitar
- Dave "Brownsound" Baksh – lead guitar, co-lead and backing vocals
- Jason "Cone" McCaslin – bass guitar
- Steve "Stevo32" Jocz – drums, co-lead vocals

== Charts ==
=== Weekly charts ===
Chart (2001)	Peak position
Australia (ARIA)	58
Austria (Ö3 Austria Top 40)	21
Belgium (Ultratop 50 Flanders)	41
Canada Radio (Nielsen BDS)	33
Canada Rock (Nielsen BDS)	24 (Note: "Fat Lip" reached number 24 between June 5, 2001 and June 11, 2001. It peaked highest on September 20, 2001, according to the Jam! link provided above.)
Europe (Eurochart Hot 100)	26
Germany (GfK)	42
Ireland (IRMA)	16
Italy (FIMI)	30
Netherlands (Dutch Top 40)	38
Netherlands (Single Top 100)	43
Scottish Singles Sales (Official Charts)	6
Switzerland (Schweizer Hitparade)	51
UK Singles (Official Charts)	8
UK Rock & Metal (Official Charts)	2
US Billboard Hot 100	66
US Alternative Airplay (Billboard)	1

=== Year-end charts ===
Chart (2001)	Position
UK Singles (OCC)	159
US Modern Rock Tracks (Billboard)	7

== Certifications ==
Region	Certification	Certified units/sales
New Zealand (RMNZ)	Platinum	30,000^{‡}
United Kingdom (BPI)	Platinum	600,000^{‡}
United States (RIAA)	2× Platinum	2,000,000^{‡}
^{‡} Sales+streaming figures based on certification alone.

== Release history ==
Region	Date	Format(s)	Label(s)	Ref.
United States	April 3, 2001	Alternative radio	Island	
United States	April 22, 2001	—N/a	Island	
United Kingdom	October 1, 2001	CD; cassette; DVD	Island	
Australia	October 8, 2001	CD	Island	
