= Cauterize (band) =

Canadian band

- Also known as: T.O.E., Toe
- Origin: Oshawa, Ontario, Canada
- Genres: Alternative rock; Pop-punk; Power pop; Post-hardcore
- Years active: 1995–2007
- Labels: Wind-up Records; High 4 Records
- Past members: Jesse Smith; Josh Slater; Jason Bone; Matt Worobec; Chuck Coles

Cauterize was a Canadian alternative rock and pop-punk band formed in Oshawa, Ontario. Originally established in 1995 under the name Toe (often stylized as T.O.E.), the group released two independent albums before renaming themselves Cauterize in 2003. They subsequently signed with Wind-up Records, releasing their major-label debut, So Far from Real, which yielded singles featured in video games and film soundtracks. The band released two additional studio albums before officially disbanding in 2007.

== History ==
=== Early years as T.O.E. (1995–2002) ===
The group formed in 1995 in Oshawa, Ontario, consisting of vocalist and guitarist Jesse Smith, guitarist Josh Slater, bassist Jason Bone, and drummer Matt Worobec. Initially performing under the name Toe (or T.O.E.), the band built a regional following across southern Ontario's punk and alternative circuit.

Under the moniker T.O.E., the band independently produced and released two full-length albums: Take Off Eh! (1999) and The Moment I Cauterize (2001). By late 2002, to avoid confusion with other musical acts sharing the name and to mark a transition into wider distribution, the quartet adopted the name Cauterize—a reference to their 2001 independent LP.

=== Major-label era: So Far from Real (2003–2004) ===
In 2003, Cauterize signed with New York-based rock label Wind-up Records. Later that year, they released their debut studio album under the new name, titled So Far from Real, produced by Colin Richardson.

The album produced two key singles, "Choke" and "Killing Me", both of which were licensed to Nintendo for inclusion on the soundtrack of the 2003 GameCube game 1080° Avalanche, alongside an in-game music video for "Choke". The music video for their follow-up single, "Something Beautiful", was directed by Nathan Cox. In 2004, the band's song "Shooting Stars" was featured on the soundtrack of the DreamWorks comedy film EuroTrip. During this period, Cauterize toured across North America alongside labelmates and contemporary rock acts including Evanescence, Hoobastank, and Three Days Grace.

=== Lineup expansion, independent releases, and breakup (2005–2007) ===
Following their departure from Wind-up Records in late 2004, the band recruited a third guitarist, Chuck Coles (formerly of chore and later of Robin Black and the Intergalactic Rock Stars), expanding to a five-piece lineup.

On June 22, 2005, Cauterize independently released their fourth full-length album, Paper Wings. The release drew interest from High 4 Records, leading to a recording contract that prompted the band to re-record portions of the record. The re-released edition of Paper Wings appeared in 2006, featuring four newly written tracks and an updated version of their song "Closer".

In 2007, Cauterize released their fifth studio album, Disguises, alongside a companion acoustic EP titled Unmasked. Shortly after the album's release, the members announced their formal disbandment. Coles subsequently joined the Canadian punk rock group Belvedere.

== Band members ==
- Jesse Smith – lead vocals, rhythm guitar (1998–2007)
- Josh Slater – lead and rhythm guitar, backing vocals (1998–2007)
- Jason Bone – bass guitar, backing vocals (1998–2007)
- Matt Worobec – drums, percussion (1998–2007)
- Chuck Coles – lead guitar (2005–2007)

== Discography ==
=== Studio albums ===
| Year | Title | Details |
|---|---|---|
| 1999 | Take Off Eh! | Moniker: T.O.E.; Label: Independent |
| 2001 | The Moment I Cauterize | Moniker: T.O.E.; Label: Independent |
| 2003 | So Far from Real | Moniker: Cauterize; Label: Wind-up Records |
| 2005 | Paper Wings | Moniker: Cauterize; Label: Independent / High 4 (re-issued in 2006) |
| 2007 | Disguises | Moniker: Cauterize; Label: High 4 Records |

=== Extended plays ===
- Unmasked (2007, High 4 Records)

=== Singles ===
- "Choke" (2003)
- "Killing Me" (2003)
- "Something Beautiful" (2004)
- "Closer" (2006)
- "Minor Key Symphony" (2007)

== Film and video game appearances ==
- 1080° Avalanche (2003, Nintendo) – "Choke" and "Killing Me"
- EuroTrip: Original Motion Picture Soundtrack (2004, DreamWorks) – "Shooting Stars"
