= Jason McCaslin =

Canadian musician (born 1980)

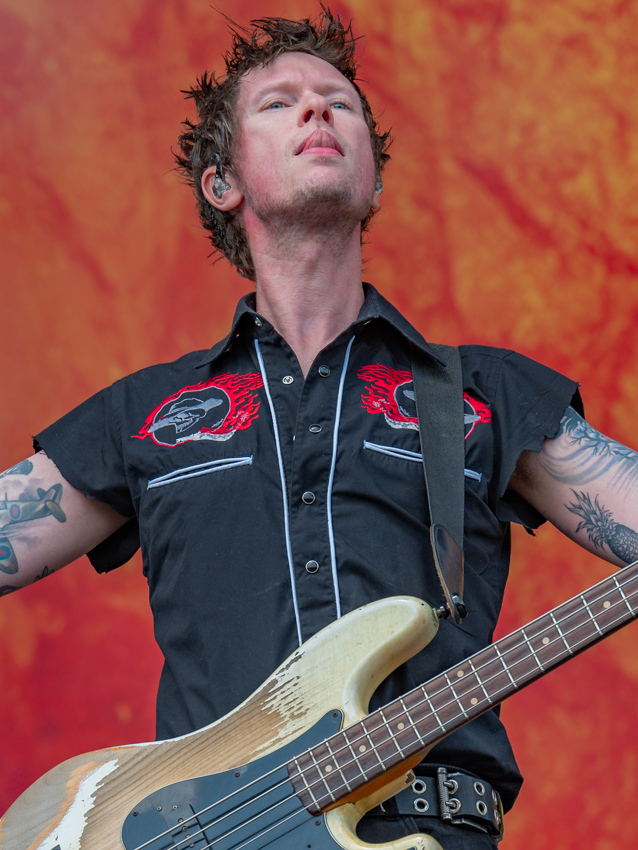
- McCaslin performing at Rock im Park in 2023

Background information
- Also known as: Cone; Sniper; Dr. Dynamite
- Born: September 3, 1980 (age 46); North York, Ontario, Canada
- Genres: Pop-punk; punk rock; alternative rock; garage rock; melodic hardcore; alternative metal
- Occupations: Musician; songwriter; producer; singer
- Instruments: Bass; vocals; guitar; keyboards
- Years active: 1998–present
- Label: Island
- Member of: The Operation M.D.
- Formerly of: Sum 41

Jason "Cone" McCaslin (born September 3, 1980) is a Canadian musician, singer, songwriter, and record producer, best known as the bassist and backing vocalist of the band Sum 41. He and frontman Deryck Whibley are the only two members of the band to appear on every studio album and EP.

== Early life ==
McCaslin began playing bass at the age of 14, as a member of a grunge garage band called Second Opinion. He is of Irish/Swedish descent.

McCaslin attended Exeter High School in Ajax, Ontario along with fellow Sum 41 band members Deryck Whibley, Dave Baksh, and their former drummer Steve Jocz.

He acquired the nickname "Cone" from fellow band member Deryck Whibley in high school, because he frequently ate ice cream cones at lunch.

== Career ==
=== Sum 41 ===
In 1999, the band signed an international record deal with Island Records. The band released their debut EP, Half Hour of Power, in 2000. Their first album, All Killer No Filler, was released in 2001. The band achieved mainstream success with their first single from the album, "Fat Lip", which reached number-one on the Billboard Modern Rock Tracks chart and remains the band's most successful single to date. All Killer No Filler was certified platinum in the United States, Canada and in the UK. The band has since released seven more studio albums: Does This Look Infected? (2002), Chuck (2004) Underclass Hero (2007), Screaming Bloody Murder (2011), 13 Voices (2016), Order in Decline (2019), and Heaven :x: Hell (2024). Sum 41's first four studio albums are certified Platinum in Canada. McCaslin went by the name Sniper in Sum 41's alter-ego heavy metal band Pain For Pleasure, where the members of Sum 41 would parody a 1980s metal band.

The band often performed more than 300 times each year and held long global tours, most of which lasted more than a year. They have been nominated for seven Juno Awards and have won twice (Group of the Year in 2002 and Rock Album of the Year for Chuck in 2005). Their fifth studio album, Screaming Bloody Murder, was released on March 29, 2011 and was nominated for a Grammy at the 2012 Grammys for the song "Blood in My Eyes" in the Hard Rock/Metal category.

=== Other appearances ===
He co-created the garage punk/garage rock side project The Operation M.D., with Todd Morse (of H_{2}O), in which he goes by the name Dr. Dynamite. He plays bass guitar and other instruments on the songs including lead vocals on a few tracks on both albums. The first album, We Have an Emergency was released in Canada and Japan exclusively in 2007. Operation M.D. then released their second album Birds + Bee Stings worldwide in late 2010 on their own label Mouth To Mouth Music.

He has also acted in many Sum 41 short films. For example, in Basketball Butcher, he gets beaten up, killed and eaten by Steve Jocz due to beating him at basketball. He also played Dante the drug dealer in 1-800-Justice. He helped produce an album with Shelter With Thieves, a Canadian band from Halifax, Nova Scotia. The EP, entitled Confessions of a Toxic Generation, was nominated for two Nova Scotia Music Awards, for Group Recording and Loud Recording. The band won the Loud Recording award for the EP.

In December 2009, McCaslin was also producing five songs for a new album by Canadian piano rock band The Greatest Invention (Formally – Credible Witness), which eventually got released under Walter Senko.

Then, in 2010, he began producing three songs for the seven-piece bluegrass/folk/indie band The Strumbellas. In September 2011, he was asked to produce the rest of the album My Father and the Hunter. It was released on February 21, 2012 and received a Juno Award nomination for Best Root/Traditional Album.

In October 2013, McCaslin made a cameo playing bass in The Strumbellas music video for "End of an Era". In 2013 McCaslin began working with Toronto band Sun K. and produced their 7" (two songs) which was released and also produced their EP and LP over the following year. In 2014, McCaslin began producing two songs for the band LeBarons which were released in 2015. He started hosting his own radio show titled Cone's Cave on CKGE-FM. The first episode aired on February 12, 2022.

== Instruments ==
McCaslin uses Fender '59 Re-Issue Precision Basses live and a Fender American Vintage '62 Re-Issue Precision Bass to record with. His personal favorite is an Olympic white Fender Precision Bass, since he was a fan of Dee Dee Ramone.

== Personal life ==
He got married on September 5, 2008. During the wedding, McCaslin's fellow band members Deryck Whibley of Sum 41 and Todd Morse of H_{2}O and The Operation M.D. performed "One" by U2 and "Pieces" by Sum 41.

McCaslin has two sisters. On December 22, 2014, his first son Max Grey McCaslin was born.

On October 9, 2018, he and his wife Shannon had a daughter, Ayla Rose McCaslin.

== Discography ==
With Sum 41

- Half Hour of Power (2000)
- All Killer No Filler (2001)
- Does This Look Infected? (2002)
- Chuck (2004)
- Underclass Hero (2007)
- Screaming Bloody Murder (2011)
- 13 Voices (2016)
- Order in Decline (2019)
- Heaven :x: Hell (2024)

With The Operation M.D.

- We Have an Emergency (2007)
- Birds + Bee Stings (2010)

With Iggy Pop

- Skull Ring (2003) – bass on "Little Know It All"

== Producing/mixing discography ==
P = Producing, M = Mixing

- The Operation M.D. – We Have an Emergency (co-produced with Todd Morse) 2007 – Nominated for Casby 2 Awards (Best New Artist + Best Indie Release) (P)
- Shelter With Thieves – Someday Is Never Soon Enough (Co-Produced 6 songs with band) Released April 19, 2011 – ECMA Award for "Loud" Recording of the Year (P)
- The Operation M.D. – Birds + Bee Stings (co-produced with Todd Morse) 2010 (P)
- Operation M.D. + Itorero – "We Stand" Song from the charity album "Rwanda Rises Up" Released June 22, 2010 (P)
- The Strumbellas – My Father and the Hunter – Released February 21, 2012 – Juno Award Nomination for "Best Roots/Traditional Album" (P)
- Walter Senko – From A Liar – Released 2013 (P)
- Sun K – Sweet Marie 7" – Released 2014 (P)
- Operation MD – Shake Your Cage (Single) – Released January 13, 2015 (P, M)
- Sun K – Northern Lies – Released March 10, 2015 (P)
- Anna Toth – Feeling Lost, Feeling Seen – Released July 2, 2015 (P)
- LeBarons – Trains 7" – Released Sept. 11, 2015 (P, M)
- Operation MD – Like Everyone Else (Single) – Released September 25, 2015 (P, M)

== See also ==
- Sum 41
- The Operation M.D.
- List of bass guitarists

Bass guitarist for Sum 41
since 1999
