= Dave Baksh =

Canadian guitarist (born 1980)

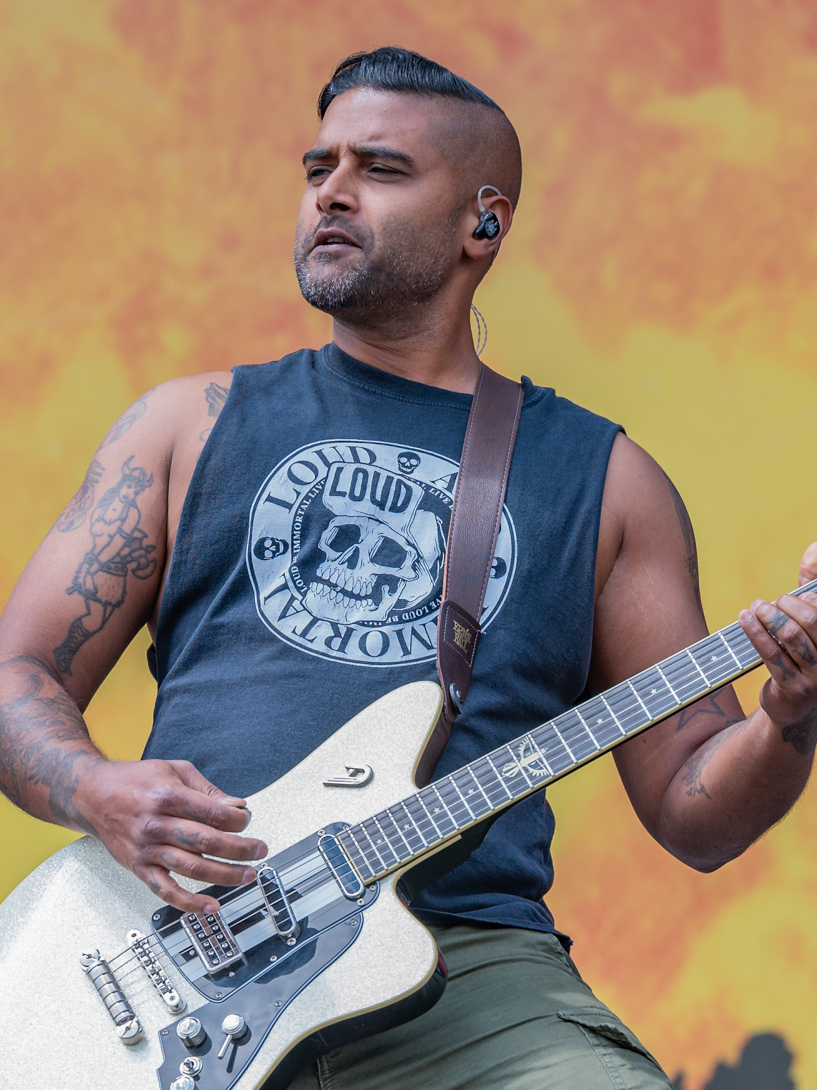
- Baksh performing at Rock im Park in 2023

Background information
- Also known as: Dave Brownsound; Hot Chocolate; Pleasure; Sweet Gravy Brown
- Born: July 26, 1980 (age 46)
- Origin: Ajax, Ontario, Canada
- Genres: Pop-punk; skate punk; punk rock; heavy metal; alternative metal; melodic hardcore; reggae; hard rock
- Occupations: Musician; songwriter
- Instruments: Guitar; vocals
- Years active: 1996–present
- Member of: Black Cat Attack
- Formerly of: Sum 41; Organ Thieves; Brown Brigade

Dave Baksh (born July 26, 1980) also known by his stage name Dave Brownsound, is a Canadian musician best known as the lead guitarist of rock band Sum 41. Baksh quit Sum 41 in 2006 (not counting a guest appearance on stage in 2008) to pursue his own career in his heavy metal/reggae project Brown Brigade. He rejoined Sum 41 in 2015 and has released three subsequent studio albums with the band. He also played guitar for Organ Thieves, with two of his fellow Brown Brigade members and currently plays with the Canadian deathpunk four-piece Black Cat Attack. In 2019, Baksh co-founded the merchandise company Loud & Immortal.

He incorporates a shred guitar style into his guitar solos. Loudwire stated that he "takes the flare of heavy metal and applies it to Sum 41’s more streamlined sound."

== Early and personal life ==
Baksh grew up in Ajax, Ontario, to an Indo-Canadian family of Indo-Guyanese origins. Baksh learned to play guitar alongside his cousin. He went to school with fellow Sum 41 bandmates Deryck Whibley, Jason McCaslin, and former drummer Steve Jocz. Baksh attended Exeter High School and was in the graduating class of 1998. He is a fan of English Premier League club Newcastle United.

== Career ==
=== Sum 41 (1998–2006; 2015–2025) ===
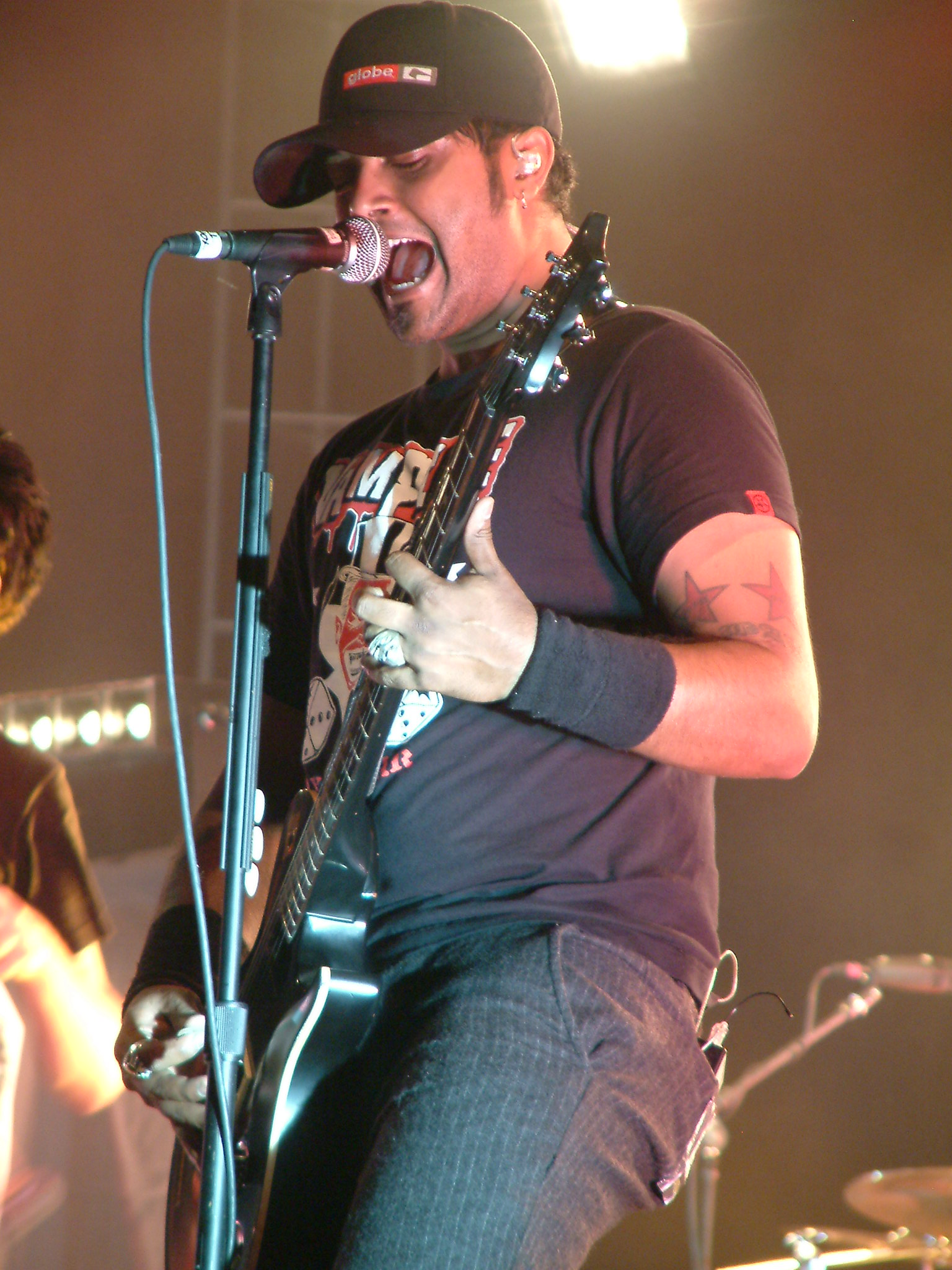
Baksh in 2003

Baksh joined Sum 41 as the third member in 1997, after Deryck Whibley and Steve Jocz formed the band in the summer of 1996. In addition to being the lead guitarist, Baksh also provided backing vocals. Baksh also goes by the names "Dave Brownsound" and "Hot Chocolate", playing off of his Indian heritage and brown sound, the name Eddie Van Halen coined for his own guitar tone. He has stated his favorite Sum 41 songs are "Mr. Amsterdam," "Machine Gun," "Pain for Pleasure," and "The Bitter End", and his least favorite to play with the band is "Pieces". Baksh went by the name Pleasure in Sum 41's alter-ego heavy metal band Pain For Pleasure, where the members of Sum 41 would parody a 1980s metal band. He played lead guitar on the band's debut EP titled Half Hour of Power (2000), and on the albums All Killer No Filler (2001), Does This Look Infected? (2002), and Chuck (2004), before leaving the band in 2006.

On July 23, 2015, Sum 41 played their comeback show at the Alternative Press Music Awards, which featured rapper DMC, and Baksh himself as guests. On August 14, 2015, after rumors and speculation, it was announced that Baksh had officially returned to Sum 41, and would appear on the band's sixth studio album. The resulting album 13 Voices was released on October 7, 2016. He remained in the band for their next two albums, Order in Decline (2019), and their final album, Heaven :x: Hell (2024).

During an interview with Loudwire in 2019, Baksh confirmed that he regretted leaving the band after hearing their fifth album, Screaming Bloody Murder (2011).

=== Brown Brigade (2006–2008) ===
On May 11, 2006, Baksh announced in a statement through his management company that he was leaving Sum 41 for personal reasons. He explained that he could not keep trying to express himself through guitar skills without being a pain to the band. During the post-Chuck hiatus, he decided it was time to move on from Sum 41 and to focus on his side project Brown Brigade, his new band that he founded with his cousin Vaughn Lal and with which he currently plays lead guitar.

Brown Brigade's debut album Into the Mouth of Badd(d)ness was released September 18, 2007, in Canada and Japan only and became critically successful, even though it was not released widely in the US and have not brought the band any outside attention, the band still continues to tour Canada in support of the album.

Baksh stated that the band is currently working on new and experimental songs to be released for free on the band's website. The new songs, unlike the band's traditional music, would feature varied music such as punk rock, funk and reggae and not metal like the debut album.

In a show that took place on March 27, 2008, in Toronto, Ontario, Baksh joined Sum 41 to play "Pain for Pleasure" at the end of the show. Some thought this was a hint of him returning to the band, however, Deryck Whibley said that Baksh's appearance was a one-off cameo and that he would continue with Brown Brigade.

On September 12, 2008, Baksh announced on the Brown Brigade's Myspace page that he would quit singing for the band, but would remain as the lead guitarist. The band was looking for a new lead singer to work on new material. On November 27, 2009, Baksh announced that due to his cousin Vaughn Lal's involvement in his business, they intended to keep Brown Brigade strictly a studio act, releasing single songs and collaborating in the studio with many different artists, with a small chance of playing live. Baksh's main focus will be Organ Thieves and Vaughn's main focus will be his new business.

=== Organ Thieves (2008–2015) ===
In mid-2008, Baksh started recording and producing his fellow Brown Brigade member Chuck Coles' new project Organ Thieves. By November 2008, Coles had asked Baksh to join the band for a few live shows, resulting in Baksh joining as a full-time member. He recorded the band's first EP God's Favorite Sons in January 2009. The EP was released for free on the band's Myspace page and was later released into physical copies in March 2009. On the same month, Baksh also joined Canadian hardcore punk outfit Blackjacket for a short UK tour.

In October 2009, Organ Thieves began pre-production for their first full-length studio album, with former longtime Sum 41 producer/manager Greig Nori. Organ Thieves has since become Baksh's main focus as he intends to keep Brown Brigade strictly a studio act.

On April 24, 2012, their first full-length studio album, Somewhere Between Free Men and Slaves, was released through MapleMusic Recordings.

== Equipment ==
He recently only plays a Duesenberg Dave Baksh Alliance guitar live on stage, which he co-designed with Duesenberg. He uses Dean Markley and Ernie Ball strings. For his pedals, he uses MXR Effects, a DigiTech Whammy, and Dunlop wah Pedals. He uses Marshall Amplification.

== Discography ==
With Sum 41

- Half Hour of Power (2000)
- All Killer No Filler (2001)
- Does This Look Infected? (2002)
- Chuck (2004)
- 13 Voices (2016)
- Order in Decline (2019)
- Heaven :x: Hell (2024)

With Brown Brigade

- Appetizer for Destruction (EP) (2006)
- Into the Mouth of Badd(d)ness (2007)

With Organ Thieves

- God's Favorite Sons (EP) (2009)
- Somewhere Between Free Men and Slaves (2012)

With Black Cat Attack

- Brightside of the Moon (EP) (2014)
- Edraculation (2016)

As a featured artist

- Charlie Benante – "Public Image" (2021)
- Gravas – "Endless"

Guitarist for Sum 41
1998–2006; 2015–present

Guitarist for Brown Brigade
2006–present
