= Deryck Whibley =

Canadian rock musician (born 1980)

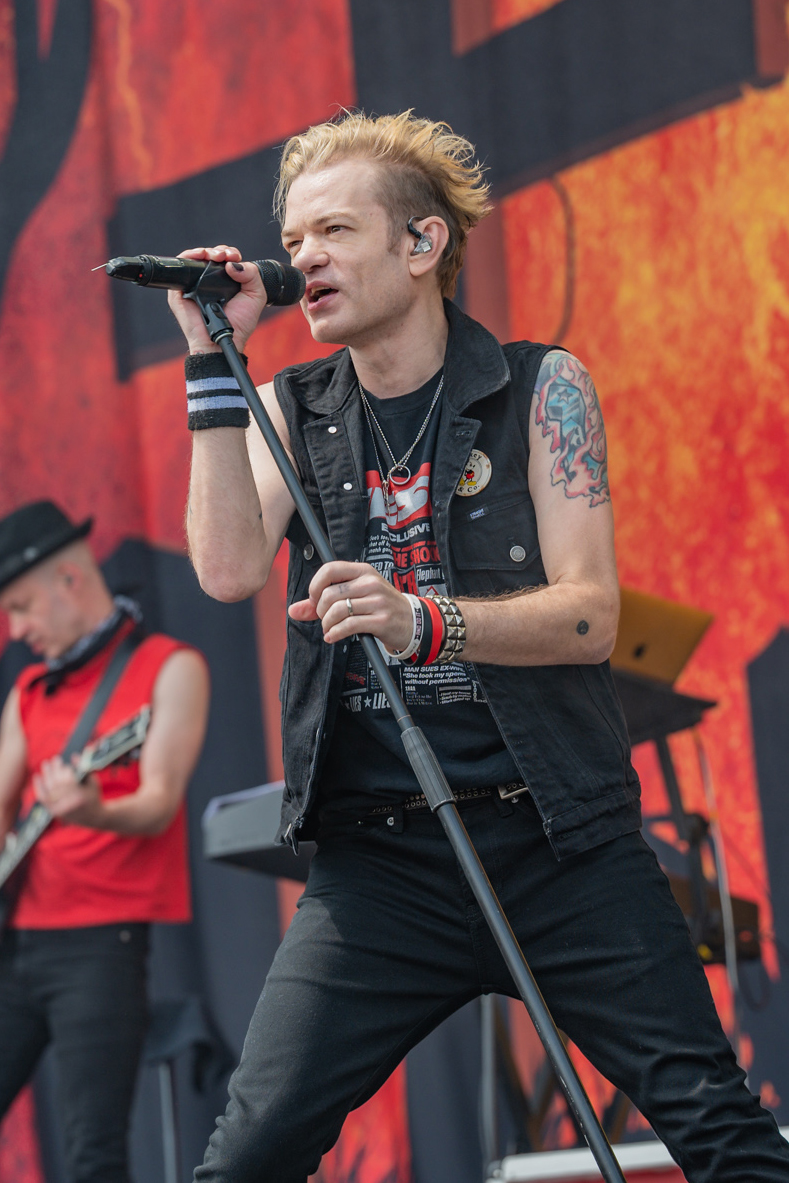
- Whibley performing in 2023
- Born: Deryck Jason Whibley; March 21, 1980 (age 46); Scarborough, Ontario, Canada
- Other names: Bizzy D; Biz; Gunner
- Occupations: Singer; musician; songwriter; record producer
- Spouses: Avril Lavigne (m. 2006; div. 2010) Ariana Cooper (m. 2015)
- Children: 2
- Musical career
- Genres: Pop-punk; skate punk; punk rock; alternative metal; melodic hardcore; alternative rock
- Instruments: Vocals; guitar; keyboards
- Years active: 1993–present
- Formerly of: Sum 41

Deryck Jason Whibley (born March 21, 1980), also known by the stage name Bizzy D, is a Canadian musician, best known as the lead vocalist, rhythm guitarist, keyboardist, main songwriter, producer, and co-founder of the rock band Sum 41. Whibley was the band's only constant member, though bassist Jason "Cone" McCaslin also performed on every studio album and EP.

== Early life ==
Whibley was born in the Toronto suburb of Scarborough, and grew up in what he describes as "a single-parent household [where] there wasn’t a lot of money around." He says he was captain of his basketball team during the sixth through eighth grades and also made the basketball team in high school, but lost interest in the sport after Michael Jordan's retirement.

== Career ==
=== Sum 41 ===
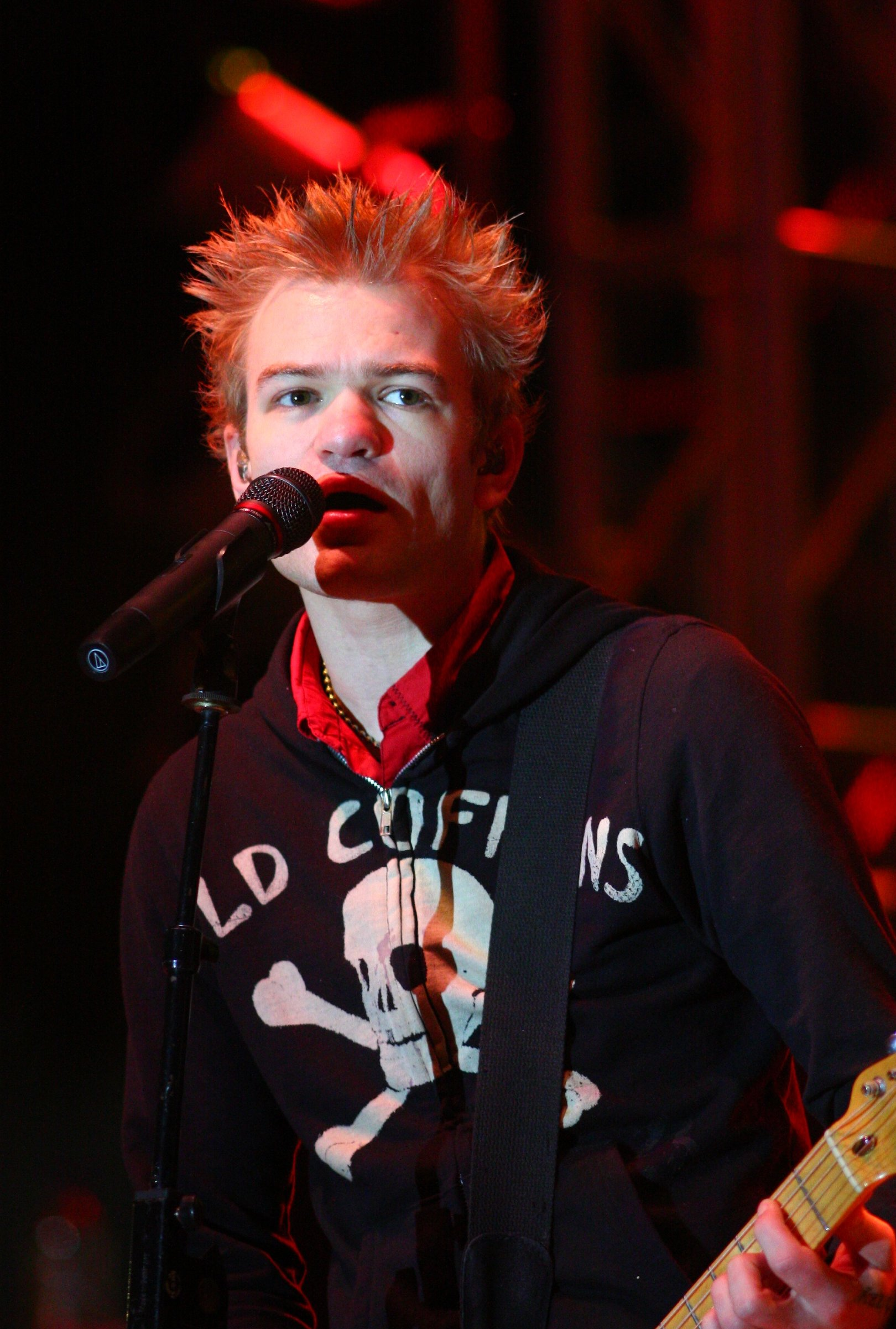
Whibley performing in 2008

Whibley formed Sum 41 with bassist Grant McVittie. After several lineup changes, the band consisted of Whibley, Steve Jocz, Dave Baksh and Jason McCaslin. In 1999, the band signed an international record deal with Island Records. The band released their debut EP, Half Hour of Power in 2000, then an album, All Killer No Filler, in 2001. The band achieved mainstream success with their first single from the album, "Fat Lip", which reached number-one on the Billboard Modern Rock Tracks chart and remains the band's most successful single to date. All Killer No Filler was certified platinum in the United States, Canada and in the UK. The band has since released seven more studio albums: Does This Look Infected? (2002), Chuck (2004), Underclass Hero (2007), Screaming Bloody Murder (2011), 13 Voices (2016), Order in Decline (2019), and Heaven :x: Hell (2024). The three albums before Screaming Bloody Murder have been certified platinum in Canada. Aside from vocals and guitar, Whibley played drums and went by the name Gunner for the Sum 41 alter-ego heavy metal band Pain For Pleasure, where the members of Sum 41 would parody a 1980s metal band. Whibley would later switched to guitar after Frank Zummo became part of the alter-ego band.

The band often performed more than 100 times each year and held long global tours, most of which lasted more than a year. They have been nominated for seven Juno Awards and have won twice (Group of the Year in 2002 and Rock Album of the Year for Chuck in 2005). During the Screaming Bloody Murder Tour, the band added Whibley's cousin Matt Whibley on keyboard.

In November 2026, following Sum 41's disbandment, Whibley revealed that he had completed recording an album of acoustic versions of Sum 41 songs and expressed interest in embarking on an acoustic tour. The album, titled Diamonds of the Night: Vol. 1, is scheduled for release on March 19, 2027, and is jointly credited to Whibley and Sum 41. It consists of twelve acoustic reinterpretations of songs from the band's discography.

=== Other projects ===
Besides Sum 41, Whibley developed a professional career in the music industry as producer and manager. He was part of Bunk Rock Music, a music management and production company. He produced for No Warning with the company as well. Since parting ways with Greig Nori, he sold his part of the company in early 2005.

During the Sum 41 hiatus in 2005 and 2006, he worked with Tommy Lee on guitar and backing vocals for his album, Tommyland: The Ride.

He worked as the producer of We Have an Emergency (2007), the debut album by Sum 41 bassist Jason "Cone" McCaslin's side project The Operation M.D. He was also involved with the Avril Lavigne album, The Best Damn Thing (2007), where he produced and played guitar.

Besides his musical career, he has worked on occasion as an actor. He portrayed the character Tony in the movie Dirty Love, and himself as a guest character in King of the Hill.

In November 2007, Whibley suffered a herniated disc while drumming on the song "Pain for Pleasure". This happened while Sum 41 was on tour with Finger Eleven, and the remainder of the Strength in Numbers Tour was canceled although Finger Eleven did travel to Winnipeg, Manitoba to play the show with Die Mannequin and Inward Eye in replacement of Sum 41.

On the Operation M.D.'s second album Birds + Bee Stings, which was released on June 29, 2010, Whibley mixed one track entitled "Sick + Twisted". He also played keyboard and piano on the same track. He also joined the band live, playing guitar on this song, on December 21, 2010, at the Horseshoe Tavern in Toronto.

Whibley contributed some guitar to Tommy Lee's side project Methods of Mayhem's second album A Public Disservice Announcement which was released on September 21, 2010.

He co-wrote the songs "Broken Pieces", "Over and Out" and "Lost in Reality" with 5 Seconds of Summer, which appeared on their She's Kinda Hot EP.

He was featured on "No Defeat for the Brave" by While She Sleeps in 2021.

On February 18, 2022, Whibley released a collaboration track with Simple Plan called "Ruin My Life".

He released his first book, a memoir titled Walking Disaster: My Life Through Heaven and Hell, on October 8, 2024. The book's title is a nod to the Sum 41 song "Walking Disaster", and their eighth and final studio album Heaven :x: Hell (2024).

In 2026, Whibley started a clothing line called "Walking Disaster". He stated that he initially had the idea in 2008, but never went through with it because he was busy with Sum 41.

== Instruments ==
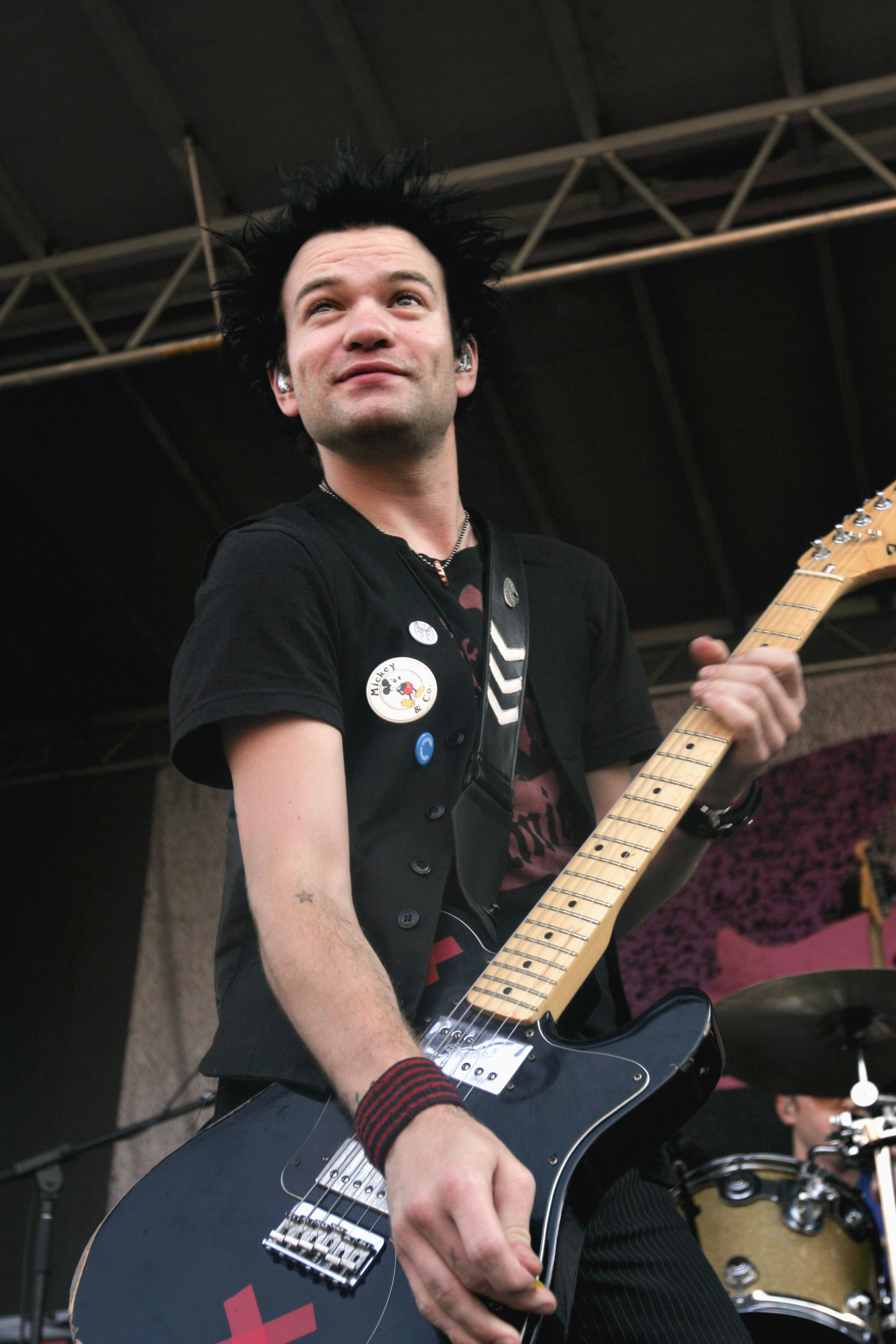
Whibley in 2010

Whibley uses a black customized '72 Fender Telecaster Deluxe live with his well-known red X's for decoration and good luck. He has also put out a signature guitar with Squier, a sub-brand of Fender. The signature Squier comes in black and Olympic white, sports the two red X's and has one humbucking pickup in the bridge position, which is a Seymour Duncan Designed HB-102. It also has his signature "Deryck" written on the headstock. Whibley has used many Gibson guitars such as the Flying V, Les Paul, SG and a Gibson Marauder, which was his first guitar given to him by his mother, and has been used in some of the band's videos such as "Fat Lip" and "In Too Deep". According to the October 2007 issue of Rock Sound magazine, he also uses '59 Les Paul Reissues, '52 Telecaster Reissues, Telefunken and Neumann mics, Plexi 100 watt Marshall Heads and Cabinets and Spectraflex cables. In March 2023, Whibley began selling items from his collection of instruments.

== Personal life ==
Whibley married fellow singer Avril Lavigne in 2006. The couple occasionally performed together and spoke about their relationship in interviews. Whibley and Lavigne began dating when she was 19 years old, after being friends since she was 17. The wedding was held on July 15, 2006. About 110 guests attended the wedding, which was held at a private estate in Montecito, California. After a little over three years of marriage, Lavigne filed for divorce on October 9, 2009, and the divorce was finalised on November 16, 2010.

On August 30, 2015, Whibley married model Ariana Cooper in Los Angeles. They lived in Encino from 2016 to 2020. Their first child was born in February 2020. Their second child was born in February 2023.

On October 8, 2024, Whibley released a memoir, Walking Disaster. In the memoir, he alleged that Greig Nori the former manager of Sum 41, psychologically and sexually abused him for several years. According to Whibley, he met Nori at age 16, when the latter was 34. He alleged Nori offered him drugs and accused him of homophobia when he attempted to end their relationship. Nori, who has denied the allegations, hired a defamation lawyer in response. He was fired as the band's manager in 2005, at Whibley's request. Nori is the co-lead vocalist of Treble Charger.

=== Health issues ===
Whibley has chronic back pain due to a series of injuries, starting with a herniated disc during a 2007 concert.

On August 5, 2010, Whibley was hospitalized after he was attacked in a bar in Japan late at night by three unknown individuals. An MRI scan after the attack revealed he had herniated a disc in his back. Although advised against performing, Whibley rejoined the band on August 8 in Osaka for the Summer Sonic Festival. The back injuries, alongside severe anxiety, caused Whibley to self-medicate with alcohol. Whibley again injured his back in April 2013, causing him to miss performances with the band.

In May, 2015 Whibley announced via social media he had been undergoing treatment for alcoholism complications. He said he poured himself a drink while at home, and collapsed in pain before he was rushed to the hospital and put in a Medically Induced Coma. He woke up a week later at Cedars Sinai Hospital, and learned of serious damage to his liver and kidneys. Whibley said he was warned consumption of additional alcohol could kill him, and also announced he was optimistic about treatment and planning new music.

On July 31, 2024, Sum 41 cancelled several tour dates after Whibley again injured his back.

== Discography ==
=== With Sum 41 ===
- All Killer No Filler (2001)
- Does This Look Infected? (2002)
- Chuck (2004)
- Underclass Hero (2007)
- Screaming Bloody Murder (2011)
- 13 Voices (2016)
- Order in Decline (2019)
- Heaven :x: Hell (2024)

=== Re-recording albums ===
- Diamonds of the Night: Vol. 1 (2027; with Sum 41)

Vocalist for Sum 41
since 1996
