= Steve Jocz =

Canadian drummer (born 1981)

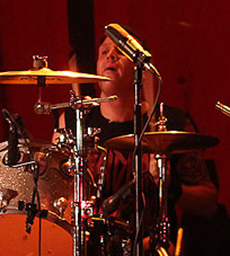
- Jocz performing with Sum 41 in 2012

Background information
- Also known as: Stevo32; Stevo Jocz; Pain; Payne
- Born: Stephen Jocz; July 23, 1981 (age 45); Ajax, Ontario, Canada
- Genres: Punk rock; pop-punk; melodic hardcore; alternative rock
- Occupations: Musician; singer; songwriter; music video director; YouTuber; stand-up comedian; real estate agent
- Instruments: Drums; vocals; guitar
- Years active: 1996–2016; 2017; 2018; 2023–present
- Formerly of: Sum 41
- Spouse: Jessy Moss (m. 2008)
- Website: stevo32drums.com

YouTube information
- Channel: Stevo32Drums
- Years active: 2024–present
- Subscribers: 68.5k

Stephen Jocz (pronounced "yotch"; born July 23, 1981), also known as Stevo32 (or simply Stevo), is a Canadian musician and music video director, best known as the founding drummer for the rock band Sum 41.

== Career ==
=== Sum 41 ===
Jocz joined Sum 41 in 1996. He graduated from Exeter High School in 1999.

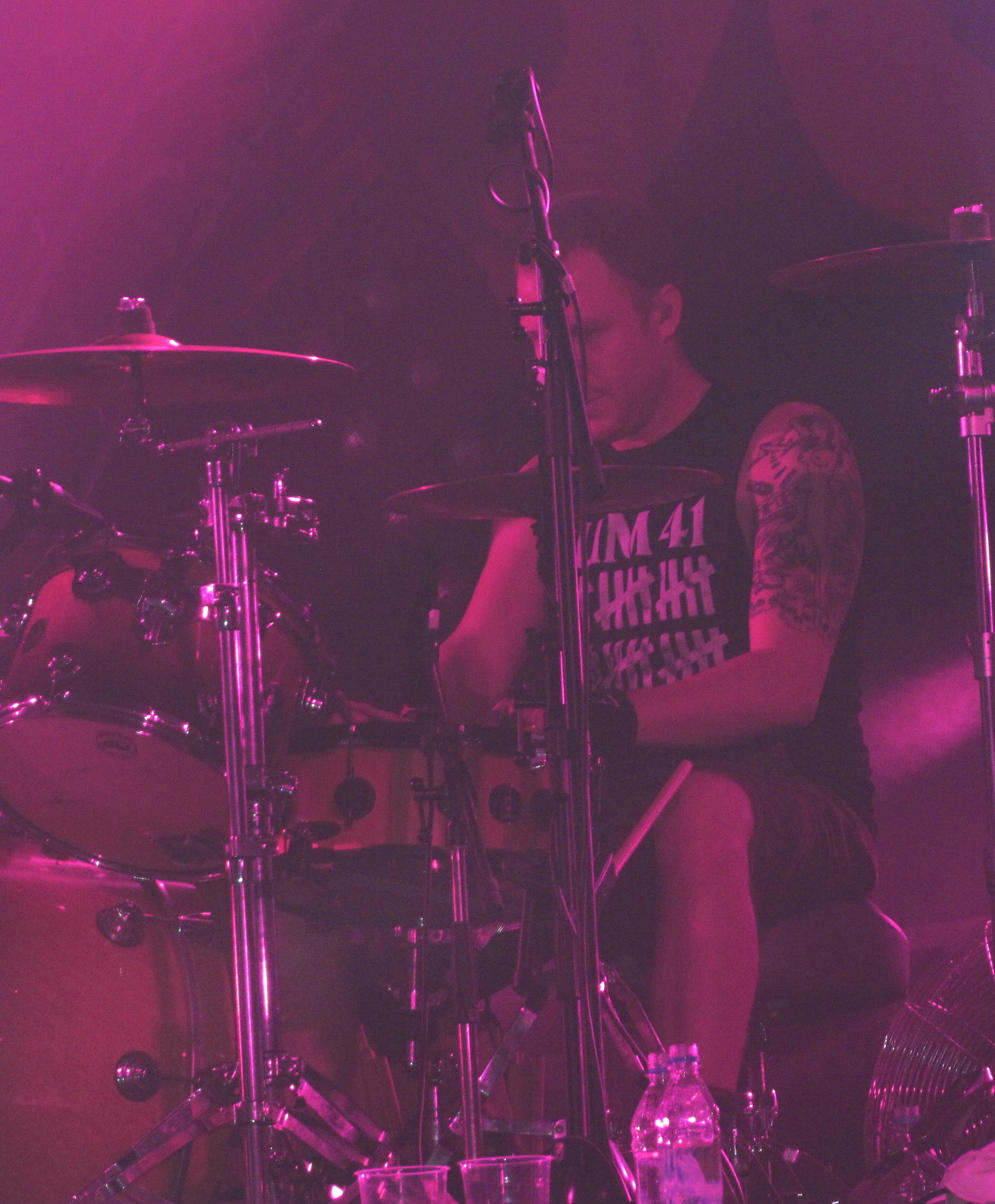
Jocz performing with Sum 41 in 2010

In 1999, the band signed an international record deal with Island Records. The band released their debut EP Half Hour of Power, in 2000. Their first album, All Killer No Filler, was released in 2001. The band achieved mainstream success with their first single from the album, "Fat Lip", which reached number-one on the Billboard Modern Rock Tracks chart and remains the band's most successful single to date. All Killer No Filler was certified platinum in the United States, Canada and in the UK. The band released four more studio albums with Jocz: Does This Look Infected? (2002), Chuck (2004) Underclass Hero (2007), and Screaming Bloody Murder (2011), the first three having been certified platinum in Canada. Aside from drums, Jocz sang lead vocals and went by the name Payne for the Sum 41 alter-ego heavy metal band Pain for Pleasure, where the members of Sum 41 would parody a 1980s metal band. Jocz frequently performed over 300 times per year with Sum 41, holding long global concert tours lasting more than a year each.

On April 18, 2013, Jocz announced on Facebook and Twitter that he had left Sum 41 with no explanation given. On May 10, 2023, after hearing that Sum 41 was planning to disband, Jocz posted on Instagram a video of him playing the drums to their song "Still Waiting" as a tribute to the band. On October 10, 2023, Jocz was interviewed for the first time since his departure from Sum 41 in 2013. During the interview, he revealed to DJ Immortal of 99.9 Punk World Radio FM about his departure from the band, stating: "I had a baby at home, I had a family at home, I had a new like little tiny person and I think for me personally, I was burnt out – all the touring, all the partying – it got to the point I wasn't happy anymore".

He was inducted into the Canadian Music Hall of Fame on 30 March 2025, along with the band members of Sum 41's final line-up, but he did not attend the ceremony.

=== Other appearances ===
In 2008, Jocz became a contributing member of the Sum 41 spin-off band The Operation M.D., co-created by Sum 41 bassist Jason "Cone" McCaslin before leaving the band in 2012. He helped the band out again in 2017 as a contributing member.

In 2007, Jocz recorded drums for two songs on Avril Lavigne's album The Best Damn Thing.

In the summer of 2008, Jocz toured with The Vandals on the Vans Warped Tour.

Jocz again helped The Vandals on drums for a show in Hawaii in 2017 and for some European dates in the summer of 2018. He toured with The Vandals again for some Japanese dates in March 2024.

After his departure in 2013, he became a stand-up comedian until 2016, when he became a real estate agent.

In 2023, Jocz started to upload drum videos on his Instagram account before starting a YouTube channel in 2024, called Stevo32Drums.

== Personal life ==
Jocz's wife, Jessy Moss, is from Sydney, Australia. They have two sons and live in Indian Wells, California.

== Discography ==
=== Sum 41 ===
- Half Hour of Power (2000)
- All Killer No Filler (2001)
- Does This Look Infected? (2002)
- Chuck (2004)
- Underclass Hero (2007)
- Screaming Bloody Murder (2011)

=== The Operation M.D. ===
- Birds + Bee Stings (2010)
- "Little Miss Takes" (2017)

=== Guest appearances ===
- Treble Charger – Detox (2002) (drums on "Over My Head")
- Iggy Pop – Skull Ring (2003) (drums on "Little Know It")
- Avril Lavigne – The Best Damn Thing (2007) (drums on "One of Those Girls" and "Contagious")
