= Steven Fairweather =

Canadian musician, radio broadcaster and writer

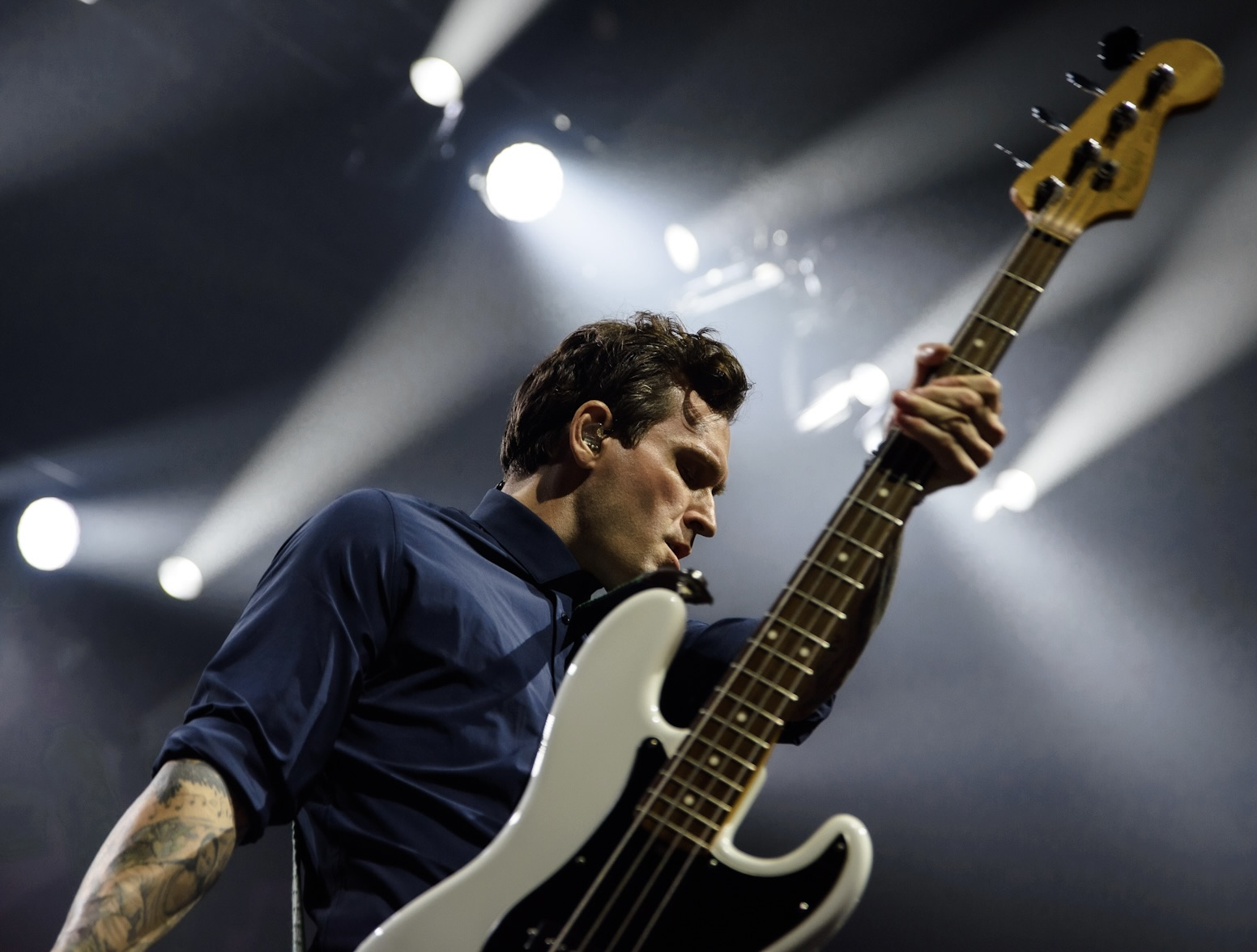
- Fairweather performing with Gob in 2023

Background information
- Also known as: Steven Strange
- Born: Steven Kenneth Fairweather; 29 December 1977 (age 48)
- Origin: Vancouver, British Columbia, Canada
- Genres: Punk rock, gothic rock, post-hardcore, indie rock
- Occupations: Musician; Radio Show Host; writer; photographer
- Instrument: Bass
- Years active: 1993–present
- Label: Aquarius
- Website: stevenfairweather.com strangerradio.com

Steven Kenneth Fairweather (born 29 December 1977) is a Canadian musician, radio broadcaster and writer. He is the bassist of the Canadian punk rock band Gob and a former member of the Vancouver post-hardcore band By a Thread.

Fairweather has also released solo recordings, hosted the New York City radio program The Church of Steventology, and founded the independent internet radio station Stranger Radio. His published writing includes the poetry collection The Colebrook Library: Selected Poems 1995–2000 and the comic book series Chaaya and the Red Hand.

== Career ==
=== Early music career ===
Fairweather performed with the Vancouver gothic-industrial group Waiting for God during the 1990s. The band's releases included Desipramine (1997), issued through Synthetic Symphony and subsequently Re-Constriction Records in North America.

He later joined By a Thread, a post-hardcore band from Vancouver signed to Revelation Records. The group's first studio album, The Last of the Daydreams, was released in 1999. Fairweather played bass in a lineup that also included vocalist and guitarist John Franco, guitarist Sean Lande and drummer Joe Franco.

By a Thread also contributed the song "Tainted" to the label compilation Revelation 100: A Fifteen Year Retrospective of Rare Recordings (2002), and released split recordings with Waterdown (2002) and Still Life Projector (2004). The band returned with a self-titled album, released by Revelation Records in 2011.

=== Gob ===
Gob's earlier albums The World According to Gob (2000) and Foot in Mouth Disease (2003), both recorded before Fairweather joined the group, were certified gold in Canada by Music Canada, on 2 May 2002 and 19 March 2025, respectively.

Fairweather joined Gob in 2008, following the departure of bassist Tyson Maiko. The band's 2014 lineup also included guitarist-vocalists Tom Thacker and Theo Goutzinakis, and drummer Gabe Mantle.

Fairweather performed on Gob's sixth studio album, Apt. 13, released on 26 August 2014 through New Damage Records. In an August 2014 interview with The Georgia Straight, he discussed the band's extended recording process and the eventual release of the album. He continued as the band's bassist for live performances, including its 2016 concert with The Offspring in Calgary, Alberta.

In 2025, Fairweather was part of Gob's lineup for an appearance at Peterborough Musicfest, ahead of announced European tour dates.

=== Solo and other recordings ===
Fairweather released the solo albums You and Yours (2011) and Visitors (2014). In a 2014 interview, he described his solo work as a separate outlet from collaborative recording with Gob. Visitors was released digitally on 7 August 2014.

Fairweather was also credited on recordings by the Vancouver group Castle Project, including The Crash Was So Unkind (2008) and Drown in the Sea of Faces (2009).

In February 2018, he performed alongside Daphne Guinness and Malcolm Doherty at The Blonds' New York Fashion Week presentation.

=== Radio broadcasting ===
By 2017, Fairweather was presenting The Church of Steventology, a music-focused radio program. In a January 2018 interview with the Italian music publication Hardsounds, he discussed the show's beginnings and plans to incorporate more interviews and talk segments. The program later became part of Stranger Radio's programming.

In 2018, Fairweather founded Stranger Radio, an independent internet radio station. The station carries music programming, including The Church of Steventology, and archives of broadcasts. His work as its founder was noted by Scene Point Blank in 2025.

== Writing and publishing ==
=== Poetry ===
Fairweather published The Colebrook Library: Selected Poems 1995–2000, a collection of poetry and autobiographical writing from his teenage years, in 2020. The collection was subsequently made available in additional print and digital editions.

=== Comic books ===
Fairweather is the writer of Chaaya and the Red Hand, a comic book series illustrated by Zitis Detorres. The first issue was published in February 2023, followed by a second in July 2023, a third in March 2024 and a fourth in September 2025. The first four issues were later collected as Chaaya and the Red Hand: Volume One.

Set in India, the series follows Chaaya, a young woman who hunts down killers and abusers. She joins forces with an excommunicated forest guard known as the Red Hand, and together they confront a corrupt system and uncover a history of abuse.

=== Other publications ===
In 2025, Fairweather published Legends, a collection of stories written by his late brother Michael Fairweather when he was a child. According to Fairweather, the manuscript was found among his brother's belongings following his death. The book was illustrated by Z. Beheshti.

== Discography ==
=== Albums ===
Year	Title	Artist	Label or release
1997	Desipramine	Waiting for God	Synthetic Symphony / Re-Constriction Records
1999	The Last of the Daydreams	By a Thread	Revelation Records
2008	The Crash Was So Unkind	Castle Project	White Whale
2009	Drown in the Sea of Faces	Castle Project	White Whale
2011	By a Thread	By a Thread	Revelation Records
2011	You and Yours	Steven Fairweather	Self-released
2014	Apt. 13	Gob	New Damage Records
2014	Visitors	Steven Fairweather	Self-released

=== Compilations and split releases ===
Year	Title	Artist / credit	Label
2002	Revelation 100: A Fifteen Year Retrospective of Rare Recordings ("Tainted")	By a Thread	Revelation Records
2002	Waterdown / By a Thread Split EP	By a Thread / Waterdown	Two Friends Recordings
2004	Still Life Projector / By a Thread	By a Thread / Still Life Projector	720 Records

== Bibliography ==
=== Poetry ===
- The Colebrook Library: Selected Poems 1995–2000 (2020; later print and digital editions). ISBN 9781714562398

=== Comics ===
- Chaaya and the Red Hand: Book One (2023), illustrated by Zitis Detorres.
- Chaaya and the Red Hand: Book Two (2023), illustrated by Zitis Detorres.
- Chaaya and the Red Hand: Book Three (2024), illustrated by Zitis Detorres. ISBN 9798879509915
- Chaaya and the Red Hand: Book Four (2025), illustrated by Zitis Detorres.
- Chaaya and the Red Hand: Volume One (collected edition), illustrated by Zitis Detorres.

=== Other ===
- Legends (2025), written by Michael Fairweather, illustrated by Z. Beheshti; published by Steven Fairweather.
