= American Wedding =

2003 American comedy film directed by Jesse Dylan

- Theatrical release poster
- Directed by: Jesse Dylan
- Written by: Adam Herz
- Based on: Characters by Adam Herz
- Produced by: Chris Moore; Warren Zide; Craig Perry; Adam Herz; Chris Bender
- Starring: Jason Biggs; Alyson Hannigan; January Jones; Thomas Ian Nicholas; Seann William Scott; Eddie Kaye Thomas; Fred Willard; Eugene Levy
- Cinematography: Lloyd Ahern
- Edited by: Stuart Pappé
- Music by: Christophe Beck
- Production companies: LivePlanet; Zide/Perry Productions
- Distributed by: Universal Pictures
- Release date: August 1, 2003
- Running time: 96 minutes
- Country: United States
- Language: English
- Budget: $55 million
- Box office: $231 million

American Wedding (known as American Pie 3: The Wedding or American Pie: The Wedding, in some countries) is a 2003 American sex comedy film written by Adam Herz and directed by Jesse Dylan. It is the sequel to American Pie (1999) and American Pie 2 (2001), and the third of the American Pie franchise.

The film's main plot focuses on the wedding ceremony of Jim Levenstein (Jason Biggs) and Michelle Flaherty (Alyson Hannigan), while its subplot centers on Steve Stifler (Seann William Scott), and his outrageous antics including his attempt to organize a bachelor party, teaching Jim to dance for the wedding, and competing with Finch (Eddie Kaye Thomas) to win the heart of Michelle's sister, Cadence (January Jones). It is the last film in the series to be written by Herz, who conceptualized the franchise, and also the only theatrical film in the series in which Chris Klein (Oz), Chris Owen (Sherman), Mena Suvari (Heather), Tara Reid (Vicky), Shannon Elizabeth (Nadia) and Natasha Lyonne (Jessica) do not appear.

Released on August 1, 2003 by Universal Pictures, American Wedding is the lowest-grossing installment in the theatrical American Pie film series, although it was still a box office success, grossing $231 million worldwide on a $55 million budget. Like the previous two films, American Wedding received mixed reviews from critics, who were again divided on its humor, but praised the cast's performances, especially Scott's.

The franchise was later expanded into a series of direct-to-DVD standalone spin-offs, under the umbrella title American Pie Presents, that began with the release of Band Camp (2005). A direct sequel to Wedding, titled American Reunion, was released in 2012.

== Plot ==
At a restaurant in East Great Falls, Michigan, Jim Levenstein is about to propose to his girlfriend Michelle until his dad, Noah, calls to inform him he left the ring at home. Michelle misinterprets Jim's hints and performs fellatio on him under the table; Noah arrives with the ring and they are publicly exposed. Jim proposes, and Michelle accepts.

Jim and Michelle exclude the vulgar Steven Stifler from the wedding plans. However, Stifler discovers the engagement party and crashes it. Jim hesitantly agrees to let Stifler come to the wedding in exchange for teaching him to dance so he can surprise Michelle.

Jim, Stifler, Paul Finch, and Kevin Myers travel to Chicago to secure Michelle's dream wedding dress. They trace the designer to a gay bar. Stifler's insecurity around homosexuals annoys the patrons, but he wins them over during a dance off with a large gay man called Bear. Impressed, Bear offers to provide strippers for Jim's bachelor party, while the dress designer agrees to make Michelle's dress.

Michelle's younger and newly single sister Cadence returns to Michigan for the wedding. Hoping to win Cadence over, Stifler acts refined and intelligent like Finch, while Finch acts like Stifler; Cadence takes a liking to them both. Meanwhile, Jim begins to have doubts about marriage, worried that he isn't good enough for Michelle and has only ever really been with one woman.

Stifler, Finch, and Kevin break into Jim's parents house to surprise him with the bachelor party, unaware Jim is bringing Michelle's parents over for dinner. The guys conceal the party from Michelle's parents until her mother finds a stripped and bound Kevin in the closet. They convince her parents that it is an elaborate plot to impress them by portraying Jim as a hero who rescues Kevin.

In Grand Traverse County, wedding preparations are underway. However, Jim shaves his pubic hair and it is sucked into a kitchen vent, destroying the wedding cake. Additionally, Jim's grandmother expresses dislike for Michelle not being Jewish, and Stifler accidentally feeds the wedding ring to a dog. Cadence admits she likes Stifler but questions if he is pretending to be different around her.

After Cadence agrees to have sex with Stifler, he steals a bottle of champagne from the kitchen, inadvertently turning off the refrigeration and killing the wedding flowers. Jim and Michelle demand he leave, supported by Cadence, who has learned of his true personality and intentions. Feeling guilty, Stifler works through the night to convince the florist to put together new displays and enlists the help of his high school football team players and Bear. Seeing the new floral display, Michelle and Jim forgive Stifler, and Cadence reconciles with him, seeing he does genuinely care about his friends; she agrees to have sex with him in a supply closet before the wedding.

Stifler is delayed by Jim, who thanks him, Finch, and Kevin for their help and support over the years. Unaware that Cadence was also delayed, Stifler enters the dark closet and has sex with someone, revealed to be Jim's grandmother, who was put there by the ushers because of her unlikable personality. Jim's grandmother becomes more pleasant afterward to the delight of Noah and Michelle.

Struggling to convey her feelings through her vows, Michelle asks Noah for help. He explains that love is not just a feeling, but the actions they do for each other. Michelle and Jim get married and share their first dance together, privately acknowledging their shared awkwardness and perversions make them perfect for each other. Stifler dances with Cadence, while the rejected Finch sits alone until Stifler's mom arrives. Though agreeing they are over each other following their previous trysts, (Note: As depicted in American Pie (1999) and American Pie 2 (2001)) they both retire to her room and have sex in a hot tub.

== Cast ==
- Jason Biggs as Jim Levenstein, Michelle's fiancé who must impress her parents before the wedding
- Seann William Scott as Steve Stifler, a high school football coach who Jim invites to the wedding in exchange for dancing lessons; he also wants to have sex with Cadence
- Alyson Hannigan as Michelle Flaherty, Jim's fiancée who is nervous during preparation for the wedding
- Eddie Kaye Thomas as Paul Finch, one of the groomsmen who spars with Stifler over their shared lust for Cadence
- Thomas Ian Nicholas as Kevin Myers, one of the groomsmen who accompanies the others
- January Jones as Cadence Flaherty, Michelle's sister who is sought after by both Stifler and Finch
- Eugene Levy as Jim's Dad, who gives Jim advice to ease him before the wedding
- Molly Cheek as Jim's Mom
- Deborah Rush as Mary Flaherty
- Fred Willard as Harold Flaherty
- Angela Paton as Grandma
- Eric Allan Kramer as Bear, a gay dancer who helps prepare the bachelor party
- Amanda Swisten as Fraulein Brandi
- Nikki Schieler Ziering as Officer Krystal
- Lawrence Pressman as Head Coach
- Reynaldo Gallegos as Leslie Summers, a designer who creates Michelle's wedding dress
- Loren Lester as Celebrant
- Justin Isfeld as Justin
- John Cho as John
- Jennifer Coolidge as Stifler's Mom
- Julie Payne as Mrs. Zyskowski
- Willam Belli as Butch Queen
- David St. James as Front Desk Manager

== Production ==
The outdoor wedding scene was filmed at the Ritz-Carlton Half Moon Bay near San Francisco.

== Soundtrack ==
The film's soundtrack includes songs by Van Morrison, Blue October, The Working Title, Foo Fighters, Feeder, Avril Lavigne, American Hi-Fi, Sum 41, the All-American Rejects, Joseph Arthur, New Found Glory, and Hot Action Cop. Everclear, Badly Drawn Boy and The Libertines also have songs in the feature. Note that most songs used were already singles. And, this is the first film to feature the song "Laid" (Matt Nathanson covering the band James) in both the trailers and the opening sequence. Notably, it is also the only film in the series to not play the song "Mrs. Robinson" in a scene where Finch has sex with Stifler's mother.

The song "Into the Mystic", played at the end of the film when Jim and Michelle take to the dance floor at the reception, begins as Van Morrison's recording, but midway through it changes to The Wallflowers' cover version due to licensing reasons. The band's lead singer Jakob Dylan is the brother of the film's director Jesse Dylan.

The film's soundtrack peaked at number 23 on the Billboard 200 chart.

American Wedding: Music from the Motion Picture

Soundtrack album by Various Artists
- Released: August 1, 2003
- Genres: Pop punk, alternative rock
- Length: 1:00:13
- Label: Uptown/Universal

Various Artists chronology
American Pie 2 (2001)	American Wedding: Music from the Motion Picture (2003)	American Reunion (2012)

No.	Title	Writer(s)	Producer(s)	Length
1.	"Times Like These" (Foo Fighters)	Foo Fighters	Nick Raskulinecz; Foo Fighters	4:26
2.	"The Anthem" (Good Charlotte)	Benji Madden; Joel Madden; John Feldmann	Eric Valentine	2:55
3.	"Forget Everything" (New Found Glory)	New Found Glory	Neal Avron	2:33
4.	"The Hell Song" (Sum 41)	Sum 41	Greig Nori	3:19
5.	"Swing, Swing" (The All-American Rejects)	The All-American Rejects	Tim O'Heir	3:54
6.	"I Don't Give" (Avril Lavigne)	Lauren Christy; Scott Spock; Graham Edwards; Avril Lavigne	The Matrix	3:37
7.	"Laid" (Matt Nathanson)	Timothy Booth; Lawrence Gott; James Patrick Glennie	Eric Bazilian	3:03
8.	"The Art of Losing" (American Hi-Fi)	Stacy Jones	Nick Launay	3:22
9.	"Fever for the Flava" (Hot Action Cop)	Robert Werthner	Michael "Bald Evil" Baker	4:03
10.	"Give Up the Grudge" (Gob)	Tom Thacker; Butch Walker; Theo Goutzinakis; Gabe Mantle; Craig Wood	Mark Trombino	2:58
11.	"Bouncing Off The Walls" (Sugarcult)	Sugarcult	Mark Trombino	2:22
12.	"Come Back Around" (Feeder)	Grant Nicholas	Gil Norton; Grant Nicholas	3:12
13.	"Any Other Girl" (NU)	NU	Michael Patterson; NU	3:23
14.	"Beloved" (The Working Title)	Joel Hamilton	Rick Beato	4:28
15.	"Calling You" (Blue October)	Justin Furstenfeld	David Castell; Justin Furstenfeld	3:58
16.	"Honey and the Moon" (Joseph Arthur)	Joseph Arthur	Joseph Arthur	4:44
17.	"Into the Mystic" (The Wallflowers)	Van Morrison	The Wallflowers	3:39

UK bonus track
No.	Title	Writer(s)	Producer(s)	Length
18.	"Here She Comes" (The Androids)	Tim Henwood	Pete Dacy; Adrian Hannan (co.)	3:10

Songs that appear during Stifler's dance in the gay bar:

- "Beat It" - Michael Jackson (only few seconds)
- "Maniac" - Michael Sembello
- "Heaven Is a Place on Earth" - Belinda Carlisle
- "Sweet Dreams (Are Made of This)" - Eurythmics
- "Venus" - Bananarama
- "The Reflex" - Duran Duran

Songs that appear during the bachelor party:

- "Summertime Girls" - Baha Men
- "Freakin You" - Jungle Brothers

== Release ==
American Wedding was released in the United States on August 1, 2003.

=== Home media ===
American Wedding premiered on DVD and VHS on January 2, 2004. It grossed $15.85 million on DVD and was the number seven DVD rental in 2004.

The film debuted on Blu-ray alongside its predecessors on March 13, 2012.

== Reception ==
=== Box office ===
American Wedding opened at #1 at the box office with $33,369,440. It dropped by 53.7% the next weekend, landing at #3 behind the new releases of S.W.A.T. and Freaky Friday. Closing about 3.5 months later (November 20, 2003), the film had grossed a domestic total of $104,565,114 and $126,884,089 overseas for a worldwide total of $231,449,203, based on a $55 million budget. Despite being a huge box office success, it is the lowest-grossing film in the series, making roughly $3 million less than American Reunion would in 2012.

=== Critical reception ===
American Wedding received mixed reviews from critics. Rotten Tomatoes, a review aggregator, assigns the film a rating of 53%, based on 156 reviews, with an average rating of 5.8/10. The site's critical consensus reads, "Raunchier and even more gross than the first two American Pies, American Wedding ought to please fans of the series." On Metacritic, the film has a score of 43 out of 100, based on 34 critics, which indicates "mixed or average" reviews. Audiences polled by CinemaScore gave the film an average grade of "B+" on an A+ to F scale.

Robert Koeler of Variety compared it to the works of John Waters and called it a "strong finish" for the franchise. Roger Ebert rated it 3/4 stars and wrote that the film "is proof of the hypothesis that no genre is beyond redemption." Elvis Mitchell of The New York Times wrote that the film "struggles so hard to be tasteless that it's almost quaint." Mick LaSalle of the San Francisco Chronicle rated it 2/5 stars and called it strained and desperate to find jokes.

=== Awards and nominations ===
Wins

- 2004 - MTV Movie Award for Best Dance Sequence (Seann William Scott)
- 2004 - Teen Choice Award for Choice Movie Villain (Seann William Scott) and Choice Movie Your Parents Didn't Want You To See

Nominations

- 2004 - Teen Choice Award for Choice Movie – Comedy, Choice Movie Actor – Comedy (Seann William Scott), Choice Movie Actress – Comedy (Alyson Hannigan), Choice Movie Blush (Seann William Scott), Choice Movie Hissy Fit (Jason Biggs), & Choice Movie Liplock (Jason Biggs & Alyson Hannigan)

== Sequel ==
In October 2008, a fourth theatrical American Pie film was greenlit by Universal Pictures. The film entered pre-production in April 2010. Despite being absent from Wedding, lead ensemble cast members Chris Klein, Mena Suvari, Tara Reid, Shannon Elizabeth, and Natasha Lyonne all signed on to return for the fourth installment.

The film, titled American Reunion, was released on April 6, 2012. Klein, Suvari, and Reid all had lead ensemble roles, whilst Lyonne and Elizabeth had cameo appearances.
