= Another Joe =

Canadian punk rock band

- Origin: Richmond, British Columbia, Canada
- Genres: Punk rock, melodic hardcore
- Years active: 1995–2001, 2022-Present
- Labels: Positive, Landspeed, Smallman, People of Punk Rock Records
- Members: Jon Glen; Alison Toews; Ryan Walter Wagner; Gabe Mantle
- Past members: John Simmonds; Richie Clingan; John Rylance

Another Joe is a Canadian punk rock band formed in Richmond, British Columbia, in 1995, when founding members Jon Glen (guitar and vocals) and John Simmonds (drums) recruited Alison Toews (bass). The trio toured extensively throughout Canada and the United States, grew a large following as well as a major buzz within the college radio circuit, and recorded 4 studio albums: Pee Against The Wind (1996, Positive Records), a split album with Gob, Ass Seen on TV (1997, Landspeed Records), Cran-Doodle Daddy (1998, Landspeed Records, Smallman Records), and Plasti-Scene (2000, Smallman Records).

== Origins ==
Another Joe was born from local Richmond, B.C. band Feuz Box, which had been formed in August 1994. Cameron Burt (vocals), Rob VanDyk (bass), and Jon Glen (guitar & vocals), brought in John Simmonds (drums) to create a new punk-influenced group inspired by Nirvana, Green Day, NOFX, Lagwagon, and other new school punk bands. Feuz Box wrote several songs, a few of which would end up on Another Joe's first album: Pee Against the Wind. Shortly after their creation Cameron Burt left the band, and not long after Rob VanDyk followed, leaving Glen and Simmonds to lay the foundation for Another Joe.

Glen and Simmonds recorded a few demos on a 4-track, with Glen on guitar, bass and vocals, while Simmonds drummed and helped engineer the process. At the time, Glen worked in a sign shop and would often bring Simmonds to help with installations. While stuck in traffic in a smoke-filled van driving to a job site, they came up with the name Another Joe.

Jon and John auditioned several bass players before meeting Alison Toews. Alison was immediately the front runner, not only for her skills on the bass or her punky cute look and bubbly personality, but also her ties with Tom Thacker of Gob, her high school sweetheart.

== History ==
=== 1995–1997 ===
Another Joe wrote and rehearsed vigorously for several months before playing their first show in the Vancouver bar The Abyss in July 1995. This was their only live performance before hitting the road with a box full of demo tapes, a van full of gear, and little money. Their first tour included shows in San Jose, and the surrounding area; they had only a handful of shows booked, and many got canceled.

Upon their return, Another Joe focused on recording their debut CD release and performing wherever they could in the Vancouver area. The Langley all-ages scene was booming, with bands such as Gob, D.b.s., Brand New Unit, and Manner Farm. These bands attracted national attention and hosted many shows featuring headliners such as No Use for a Name, Hi-Standard, AFI, and Swingin' Utters. This scene, consisting of mostly under-age teens, became the life force of Another Joe and would partly inspire their first music video.

Recording for Pee Against The Wind began in September 1995 at Sporadic Studios, Victoria B.C., engineered by Jason Flowers. The sessions were recorded over a weekend using a 6-channel multi-track cassette recorder for the drums, bass, and guitars, and an 8-channel DAT recorder to add vocals. The vocals were re-recorded in Vancouver at Big Midget Sound, where the final record was also mixed. Pee Against the Wind was released by Positive Records, owned by Tom Thacker of Gob in March 1996, and a video for the single "Eat at Bernie's" was shot in February 1996. "Eat at Bernie's" debuted on Much Music in Canada in April 1996.

Another Joe embarked on their second tour in the summer of 1996. They targeted Western Canada, playing shows throughout British Columbia and Alberta, gaining a reputation as a hard-working live band. To support the tour, they sold T-shirts and hundreds of copies of Pee Against the Wind.

In October 1996, Gob and Another Joe recorded a split CD called Ass Seen on TV. The 21-song collaboration included 9 songs from Gob, and 8 songs from Another Joe including "Simon Says", "What", "Spam", "Outta Here", and a cover of Canadian punk legends The Ripcords "Whatever Happened To". Both bands recorded two bonus songs that are available only on the vinyl release, Another Joe's being the songs "Dink" and "I'm Hungry".

In November 1996, Another Joe and Gob went on a brief tour—3 shows in 3 days in Prince George, to Edmonton, and Calgary. Over the following months, Gob and Another Joe completed the mixing and mastering of Ass Seen on TV, and it was released on May 13, 1997, by Landspeed Records.

In January 1997, Simmonds left Another Joe to form the band Willis with original Feuz Box member Rob VanDyk and, in 2000, formed the record label Worn Records. Glen and Toews added Manner Farm drummer Richie Clingan in April 1997. The three toured extensively across Canada that summer and built on what was becoming a large national following.

=== 1998–2001 ===
Another Joe's full-length album, Cran-Doodle Daddy charted heavily on radio across Canada and re-affirmed their spot among the top punk bands in Canada. In 1998, Another Joe toured through North America with bands such as AFI, No Use For A Name, Diesel Boy, Hi-Standard, SNFU, Guttermouth, Chixdiggit, and The Suicide Machines.

In the fall of 1999, Another Joe began working with Smallman Records, and with the technical assistance of drummer John Rylance, created their hit album, Plasti-Scene. Plasti-Scene was released in February 2000, charting quickly on National College Radio Charts and reaching number two on the National Loud Radio Chart in April 2000. The album was seen as a departure from the band's classic "snotty Punk Rock", featuring a more serious sound, learning towards Melodic hardcore with lyrical content about social commentary rather than relationships. In support of Plasti-Scene, Another Joe hosted the first annual Smallman Records tour, going to 14 ski resorts in British Columbia and Alberta. After returning to Vancouver in May 2000, John Rylance left the band, and Glen and Toews were unable to find a replacement.

Another Joe disbanded in January 2001. Alison Toews joined the band State of Shock, Richie Clingan a band called Jacqueline/Deepsearch.

=== 2022 reformation/new lineup ===
On October 17 2022, Another Joe announced their new lineup with Jon and Alison being joined by Ryan Walter Wagner (guitar) and Gabe Mantle (drums). They also launched a website and released a new album titled Ready or Not through People of Punk Rock Records on February 3, 2023.

== Band members ==
=== Current ===
- Jon Glen – lead guitar, lead vocals (1995–2001, 2012–present)
- Alison Toews – bass, backing vocals (1995–2001, 2012–present)
- Ryan Walter Wagner - Guitar, backing vocals (2022-present)
- Gabe Mantle - Drums, backing vocals (2022-present)

=== Former ===
- John Simmonds – drums, backing vocals (1995–1997)
- Ritchie Clingan – drums, backing vocals (1997–1999)
- John Rylance – drums, backing vocals (1999–2001)

== Discography ==
- Pee Against The Wind (1996, Positive Records)
- Ass Seen on TV with Gob (1997, Landspeed Records)
- Crandoodle Daddy (1998, Landspeed Records, Smallman Records)
- Platiscene (2000, Smallman Records)
- Ready or Not (2023, People of Punk Rock Records)
