= Apt. 13 =

Studio album by Gob
- Released: August 26, 2014
- Studios: The Armoury, Steep Street, Apt 13, Richardson Sound
- Genres: Alternative rock; punk rock
- Length: 29:34
- Label: New Damage
- Producer: Tom Thacker

Gob chronology
Muertos Vivos (2007)	Apt. 13 (2014)

Apt. 13 is the sixth studio album by Canadian rock band Gob, released on August 26, 2014, by New Damage Records. On May 27, 2014, the song "Cold" was available to stream along with information on the album and was also released as the lead single from the album. "Radio Hell" was released as the album's second single. This is the first Gob album to not feature any lead vocals from guitarist Theo Goutzinakis, as well as their first with new bassist Steven Fairweather.

== Reception ==
Reception for the album has been mixed. In a negative review, New Noise Magazine's Tony Shrum wrote, "[I]t seems that the band tried to become more grown-up and left the fun behind." Exclaim! was more positive in its recap: "The return to form for the album's closing trio does a good job at summing up its dark yet catchy sound. Apt. 13 is definitely worth a visit — or even a prolonged stay."

== Track listing ==
All songs written and composed by Tom Thacker.

1. "Apt 13" – 4:00
2. "Radio Hell" – 3:18
3. "Same As It Ever Was" – 2:16
4. "Cold" – 3:47
5. "Walking Alone" – 2:56
6. "New York" – 3:48
7. "Terpsichore" – 2:50
8. "NIL" – 2:58
9. "Keep You Standing There" – 3:58
10. "Call for Tradition" – 2:41

=== iTunes deluxe version ===
1. "Apt 13" – 4:00
2. "Radio Hell" – 3:18
3. "Same As It Ever Was" – 2:16
4. "Cold" – 3:47
5. "Walking Alone" – 2:56
6. "New York" – 3:48
7. "Cars on Fire" – 2:27
  - Bonus track
8. "Terpsichore" – 2:50
9. "NIL" – 2:58
10. "(Get It) Tonight" – 3:18
  - Bonus track
11. "Can't Get Over You" – 3:42
  - Bonus track
12. "Keep You Standing There" – 3:58
13. "Call for Tradition" – 2:41

== Personnel ==
- Tom Thacker – guitar, vocals, keys
- Theo Goutzinakis – guitar, backing vocals
- Gabriel Mantle – drums
- Steven Fairweather – bass
