= How Far Shallow Takes You =

Studio album by Gob
- Released: December 8, 1998
- Recorded: September 21–24, October 1–6, 1998
- Genres: Punk rock, Melodic hardcore, Skate punk
- Length: 35:54; 39:11 (US release)
- Labels: Nettwerk, Landspeed, Fearless
- Producers: Blair Calibaba, Gob

Gob chronology
Has Fil Flipped? (1997)	How Far Shallow Takes You (1998)	The World According to Gob (2001)

Professional ratings
Review scores
Source	Rating
AllMusic	3/5 stars

How Far Shallow Takes You is the second full-length studio album by Canadian punk rock band Gob, and was released on November 24, 1998, on Fearless Records. The album was re-released on December 8, 1998, on Landspeed Records due to a conflict between the band and Fearless Records. The album was again re-released by Nettwerk Management; both this version and the Landspeed version featured a 17th track, "All We Are". The American release also featured a cover of "Paint It Black" by the Rolling Stones, and an alternate recording of "What to Do". "What to Do" and "Beauville" were released as singles. What to Do was featured in the 2000 DCOM film Mom's Got a Date with a Vampire. It is the first album to feature bassist Craig Wood and drummer Gabe Mantle. The album was described by AllMusic as containing "generally well-executed melodic punk rock in the style common in the 1990s." By December 1999, the album had sold 20,000 copies in Canada.

== Track listing ==
All songs are written by Tom Thacker, and Theo Goutzinakis, except where noted.

How Far Shallow Takes You track listing
No.	Title	Writer(s)	Lead vocals	Length
1.	"236 E. Broadway"		Thacker	1:19
2.	"On These Days..."		Thacker	2:24
3.	"Self-Appointed Leader"		Goutzinakis	3:12
4.	"Beauville"		Thacker	1:42
5.	"What to Do"		Goutzinakis	2:22
6.	"The Mend"		Thacker	1:38
7.	"Reign on Your Parade"		Goutzinakis	2:24
8.	"Suds"		Thacker	2:25
9.	"Nothing New"		Thacker	3:11
10.	"Burying Your Past"		Thacker	1:39
11.	"Naked"		Thacker	2:21
12.	"License from a Cereal Box"		Goutzinakis	2:03
13.	"Stand and Deliver"		Goutzinakis	1:33
14.	"Ok"		Thacker	2:08
15.	"Together"	Happy Kreter	Goutzinakis	1:59
16.	"Things Happen All the Time"		Thacker	1:19
17.	"All We Are"		Goutzinakis	2:02
Total length:				35:54

US version
No.	Title	Writer(s)	Lead vocals	Length
18.	"Paint It Black" (The Rolling Stones cover)	Jagger-Richards	Thacker	3:17
Total length:				39:11

== Personnel ==
- Theo - Lead and Backing Vocals, Lead and Rhythm Guitar
- Tom - Lead and Backing Vocals, Lead and Rhythm Guitar
- Craig - Bass, Backing Vocals
- Gabe - Drums, Backing Vocals
- The Greek - backing vocals
- The Hick - backing vocals
- The Shrimp - backing vocals
- The Kid - backing vocals
- Howdy Doody - backing vocals
- Blair Calibaba - Recording, producer, mixing
- Tom Lord-Alge - Mixing ("What To Do")
- Zach Blackstone - 2nd engineer
- Eddy Schreyer - Mastering
