= Foot in Mouth Disease =

Studio album by Gob
- Released: April 1, 2003
- Genres: Pop-punk; punk rock
- Length: 44:32
- Labels: Arista (International), Nettwerk (Canada), BMG (Japan)
- Producers: Mark Trombino; Gob (co.)

Gob chronology
F.U. EP (2002)	Foot in Mouth Disease (2003)	Muertos Vivos (2007)

Professional ratings
Review scores
Source	Rating
AllMusic	2.5/5 stars
Blender	2/5 stars

Foot in Mouth Disease (stylized as FOOT in Mouth DISEASE) is the fourth studio album by Canadian punk rock band Gob, released on April 1, 2003 in Canada by Nettwerk, internationally by Arista Records, and in Japan by BMG. It is the band’s final album with longtime bassist Craig Wood, as he left the band in 2004. Four singles were released from the album: "Give Up the Grudge", "Oh! Ellin", "Ming Tran" (which previously appeared on the F.U. EP), and "This Evil World".

Three of the album's tracks have been featured in many Electronic Arts video games. The album's second track "I've Been Up These Steps" was in NHL 2003, "Oh! Ellin" was in NHL 2004, and "Give Up the Grudge" was in Madden NFL 2004 and the 2003 film American Wedding. The song "Ming Tran" was featured in the Being Ian episode, "Band 'o' Bruthaz", which features Gob as guest stars.

Foot in Mouth Disease was nominated for "Favourite New Album" at the 2003 CASBY Awards.

== Track listing ==
1. "Lemon-Aid" – 2:45
2. "I've Been Up These Steps" – 2:48
3. "Oh! Ellin" – 3:59
4. "I Cut Myself, Too" – 3:13
5. "Fed Up" – 4:18
6. "Ming Tran" – 2:34
7. "When Life Gets Boring..." – 3:06
8. "Give Up the Grudge" – 2:57
9. "Bones" – 2:12
10. "This Evil World" - 3:22
11. "I Hear You Calling" (American Edition Only) – 3:10
12. "Bully" – 3:31
13. "Cold Feet" – 2:48
14. "Everybody's Getting Hooked Up" – 3:23

=== Japanese bonus tracks ===
1. "My New Favorite Shoplifter" – 3:00
2. "Heavy Metal Shuffle" (Kick Axe Cover) – 2:55

=== Special Edition ===
1. "Give Up the Grudge" (radio edit) – 2:57

== Bonus DVD ==
Audio Tracks

1. What To Do
2. Beauville
3. L.A. Song
4. For The Moment
5. Sick With You
6. No Regrets
7. On These Days...
8. Soda
9. Marching Song
10. Marching Song (Pointed Sticks)
11. Custers Last 1 Nite Stand (live)
12. Heavy Metal Shuffle
13. Self Appointed Leader

Videos from The World According to Gob

1. I Hear You Calling
2. For The Moment
3. No Regrets

== Band ==
- Theo Goutzinakis - Backing vocals (lead vocals on "Bully"), guitar
- Tom Thacker - Lead vocals (backing vocals on "Bully"), guitar
- Craig Wood - Bass, vocals
- Gabe Mantle - Drums, vocals

== Charts ==
Chart (2003)	Peak position
Australian Albums (ARIA Charts)	90
Canadian Alternative Albums (Nielsen Soundscan)	36

== Certifications ==
Region	Certification	Certified units/sales
Canada (Music Canada)	Gold	50,000^{‡}
^{‡} Sales+streaming figures based on certification alone.
