= Muertos Vivos =

Studio album by Gob
- Released: October 30, 2007
- Genres: Alternative metal, hard rock, punk rock
- Length: 45:30; 55:02 (w/ bonus tracks)
- Label: Aquarius
- Producers: Thomas Thacker, Theo Goutzinakis

Gob chronology
Foot in Mouth Disease (2003)	Muertos Vivos (2007)	Apt. 13 (2014)

Professional ratings
Review scores
Source	Rating
EuroPunk	4/5 stars
Sputnikmusic	(3.5/5)
ThePunkSite.com	(4/5)

Muertos Vivos is Gob's fifth studio album. It was released on October 30, 2007 in Canada. It is the only album featuring bassist Tyson Maiko, who left the band in 2008.

The album's title is Spanish for "living dead". The first single from the album was "We're All Dying", which got its first radio play on June 18, 2007. The second single, "Underground", was first played on The Fox Vancouver, 99.3. The third single was "Banshee Song", released in 2009.

A song frontman Tom Thacker has originally written for this album, entitled "Panic Attack", has become the title track from Sum 41's fifth studio album Screaming Bloody Murder, which was the band's first album to be recorded with Thacker as lead guitarist.

The album cover art is a reprint of Calavera Oaxaqueña by Mexican folk artist José Guadalupe Posada

== Release ==
On September 10, 2007, Muertos Vivos was announced for released the following month; alongside this, "We're All Dying" and "Prescription" were made available for streaming through the band's Myspace profile. Muertos Vivos was released on October 30, 2007 through Aquarius Records. In November 2007, the band embarked on a short tour of Canada. On November 19, 2007, a music video was released for "We're All Dying". A music video was released for "Underground" on February 11, 2008. In January and February 2009, they embarked on a cross-country Canadian tour.

== Track listing ==
- All songs written by Thomas Thacker, except where noted otherwise.

No.	Title	Length
1.	"We're All Dying"	3:26
2.	"War is a Cemetery"	3:13
3.	"Dead End Love"	3:22
4.	"Prescription"	3:03
5.	"Underground"	3:35
6.	"Still Feel Nothing"	4:38
7.	"Banshee Song"	4:41
8.	"18"	4:19
9.	"About My Summer"	3:45
10.	"Face the Ashes" (Theo Goutzinakis)	3:30
11.	"Open Wounds"	3:52
12.	"Wake Up"	4:13
Total length:		45:30

Japanese/iTunes bonus tracks
No.	Title	Length
13.	"Girl A"	3:40
14.	"Embitter Me Sweet"	5:39
Total length:		55:02

== Singles ==
- "We're All Dying"
- "Underground"
- "Banshee Song"

== Credits ==
- Gob
  - Tom Thacker - lead vocals, lead & rhythm guitars, production, sound engineering, mixing
  - Theo Goutzinakis - lead & rhythm guitars, lead vocals on "Face the Ashes", backing vocals, production, sound engineering, mixing
  - Gabe Mantle - drums, percussion
  - Tyson Maiko - bass
- Ted Jensen - mastering
- Dave Ogilvie - mixing
- Misha Rajaratnam - editing
- Paul Silveira - vocals, sound engineering, mixing
- Rob Stefanson - vocals, sound engineering
