= Hot Action Cop (album) =

Studio album by Hot Action Cop
- Released: March 4, 2003
- Recorded: 2002
- Genres: Nu metal; funk metal; alternative rock; rap metal
- Labels: Lava; Atlantic
- Producer: Michael Baker

Hot Action Cop chronology
| Nutbag EP (2002) | Hot Action Cop (2003) | 2009 EP (2009) |

Singles from Hot Action Cop
- 1. "Fever for the Flava" Released: May 19, 2003; 2. "Don't Want Her to Stay" Released: June 3, 2003

Professional ratings
Review scores
| Source | Rating |
|---|---|
| AllMusic | link |
| MusicOMH | (favorable) |

Hot Action Cop is the debut album by American rock band Hot Action Cop. It was released on March 4, 2003. The album was also released in a clean (censored) version and featured a whole new set of lyrics for the song "Show Her" (excluding the chorus) including a bridge that made fun of the need to censor an album.

== Track listing ==
All tracks are written by Rob Werthner.

| No. | Title | Length |
|---|---|---|
| 1. | "Doom Boom" | 5:21 |
| 2. | "Goin' Down on It" | 4:50 |
| 3. | "Don't Want Her to Stay" | 3:16 |
| 4. | "Fever for the Flava" | 4:09 |
| 5. | "Busted" | 4:48 |
| 6. | "Face Around" | 5:18 |
| 7. | "Club Slut" | 4:10 |
| 8. | "The Special" | 4:54 |
| 9. | "Show Her" | 4:47 |
| 10. | "Alayal" | 4:53 |
| 11. | "Why Judy" | 5:16 |
| 12. | "In a Little While" | 3:57 |
| 13. | "Don't Remember" (Japan exclusive bonus track) | 3:53 |

== Popular culture ==
The tracks "Goin' Down on It" and "Fever for the Flava" was featured in the 2002 racing video game Need for Speed: Hot Pursuit 2 (albeit with lyrics to reflect street racing to maintain the game's "E" rating). "Fever for the Flava" was also featured in the films American Wedding, The Hot Chick and Grind.

== Personnel ==
Hot Action Cop

- Luis Espaillat – Bass
- Kory Knipp – Drums
- Tim Flaherty – Guitar
- Rob Werthner – Vocals, and Guitar

Additional musician

- Murray "Eh" Atkinson - Guitar
- Roach - Keyboards

Production

- Michael Baker (tracks: 4, 5, 7, 10, 11), Paul Silveira (tracks: 4, 5, 7, 10, 11), Randy Staub (tracks: 1 to 3, 6, 8, 9), Robert "Void" Caprio (tracks: 12) – mixing
- Charlie Brocco, Max Maxwell, Paul Silveira, Shaun Thingvold – engineering (Additional)
- Amy Worobec, Arthur Kirkby, Chad Taylor, Kathy Miller, Kristina Ardron, Mike Weinstein, Misha Rajaratnam – engineering (Assistant)
- Alex Aligizakis, Carla Levis, Dave "The Scribe" Bryant*, Kirk McNally – engineering (Second)
- Robert "Void" Caprio - Recording
- Charlie Becker – Artwork
- George Marino – Mastering
