= The World According to Gob =

The World According To Gob

Studio album by Gob
- Released: October 10, 2000
- Genre: Punk rock
- Length: 47:05
- Label: Nettwerk Records
- Producer: Neill King

Gob chronology
How Far Shallow Takes You (1998)	The World According To Gob (2000)	F.U. EP (2002)

Professional ratings
Review scores
Source	Rating
AllMusic	2/5 stars
Alternative Press	4/5
CMJ New Music Monthly	(favorable)
Sputnikmusic	3.5/5

The World According To Gob is the third studio album by Canadian punk rock band Gob, and was released in Canada on October 10, 2000. It includes the singles "I Hear You Calling", "For The Moment", "No Regrets" and radio only single "That's The Way". The album was certified gold in Canada on May 2, 2002. "I Hear You Calling" was re-recorded for the band's next album Foot in Mouth Disease which was released three years later.

== Track listing ==
1. "For the Moment" - 3:29
2. "I Hear You Calling" - 3:12
3. "No Regrets" - 2:34
4. "Everyone Pushed Down" - 3:07
5. "Pinto" - 2:38
6. "Looking for California" - 3:59
7. "Sleepyhead" - 4:01
8. "Ex-Shuffle" - 2:42
9. "That's the Way" - 2:45
10. "Been So Long" - 3:14
11. "144" - 3:17
12. "Can I Resist" - 2:30
13. "Desktop Breaking" - 3:02
14. "Perfect Remedy" - 7:37 (Includes hidden track)

== Personnel ==
- Theo - Guitar, Lead Vocals on tracks 3, 8, 9, 12 and Backing Vocals
- Tom - Guitar, Lead Vocals on tracks 1, 2, 4, 5, 6, 7, 10, 11, 13, 14 and Backing Vocals
- Craig - Bass, Backing Vocals
- Gabe - Drums, Backing Vocals
- Vasilis - Backing vocals
- Neill King - Producer, engineer, mixing, backing vocals
- Blair Calibaba - Engineer, mixing
- Sheldon Zaharko - 2nd engineer
- Stephanie Hill - 2nd engineer
- Shaun Thingvold - 2nd engineer
- Eddy Schreyer - Mastering

== Trivia ==
The album's title alludes to The World According to Garp, a novel by John Irving. The hidden track is a version of the instrumental Zorba's Dance by Mikis Theodorakis.

== Certifications ==
Region	Certification	Certified units/sales
Canada (Music Canada)	Gold	50,000^{^}
^{^} Shipments figures based on certification alone.
