= Too Late... No Friends =

Studio album by Gob
- Released: June 1995
- Studio: Utopia Parkway Studios
- Genre: Punk rock, skate punk, melodic hardcore
- Length: 32:03
- Label: Mint Records, Landspeed Records, Nettwerk
- Producer: Gob

Gob chronology
Green Beans and Almonds (1995)	Too Late... No Friends (1995)	Has Fil Flipped?! (1997)

Professional ratings
Review scores
Source	Rating
AllMusic	3/5 stars
Sputnikmusic	(3/5)

Too Late... No Friends is the first full-length studio album by Gob, and was released in 1995 on Mint Records. It was re-released in 2000 on Nettwerk/Landspeed. There were four singles released off of the album: "Soda", "Fuck Them", "Bad Day" and "You're Too Cool". Since each song on the album lasted an average of 1:30, there were four singles released instead of the usual two.

== Track listing ==
1. "Extra, Extra" - 2:02
2. "Lobster Boy" - 1:19
3. "You're Too Cool" - 1:45
4. "Bad Day" - 1:42
5. "Fuck Them" - 1:28
6. "Cleansing" - 1:16
7. "Leave Me Alone" - 1:41
8. "Open Your Eyes" - 1:57
9. "Marlena" - 2:10
10. "I Want You Back Baby" - 1:12
11. "Marching Song" - 1:09
12. "Asshole TV" - 2:17
13. "Soda" - 1:35
14. "Fido Dildo" - 1:07
15. "Losing Face" - 1:19
16. "I Don't Know" - 1:30
17. "Centipede" - 1:06
18. "Censorshit" - 1:42
19. "Custer's Last 1 Nite Stand" - 1:44
20. "Hey Stephanie" (the Smugglers cover)

Tracks 1–19 were written by Gob.

The re-release liner notes state that the band photos on the inside booklet of the original pressing were removed due to people complaining of electrostatic shock from the photos. They replaced the said photos with a live band photo of unknown origin with lyrics printed over it. "Marching Song" is actually a short instrumental track comprised almost solely of kazoo and fart noises. Early versions of tracks 6, 15, and 19 were released on their 1994 release, Gob. Early versions of tracks 2, 5, 12, and 16 were featured on their EP Dildozer. Early versions of tracks 1 and 10 were on their previous EP Green Beans and Almonds.

== Personnel ==
Gob

- Tom Thacker - guitar, vocals
- Theo Goutzinakis - guitar, vocals
- Patrick "Wolfman Pat" Paszana - drums, backing vocals
- Jamie Fawkes - bass

Production

- Gob – production
- John Shepp - engineering
- Blair Calibaba - mixing
- George Leger - mastering
