= Hot Action Cop =

American rock band

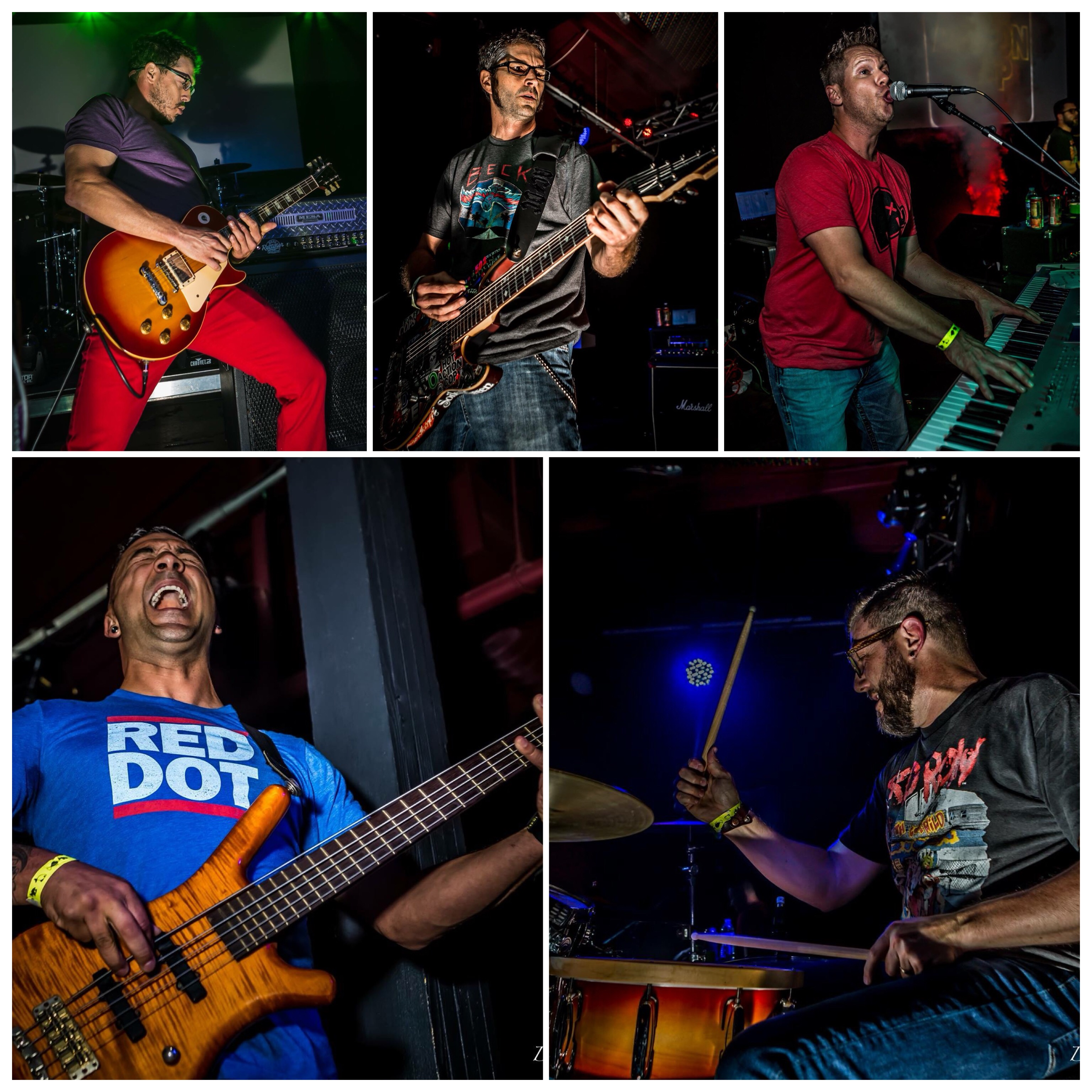
- Hot Action Cop in 2017. Clockwise from top Left: Rob Werthner, Timmy Flaherty, Brian Smith, Kory Knipp, Juan Chavolla.

Background information
- Origin: Nashville, Tennessee, U.S.
- Genres: Rap rock; alternative rock; funk rock; nu metal
- Years active: 2001–present
- Labels: Lava; Atlantic; Red Panda 7
- Members: Rob Werthner; Tim Flaherty; Kory Knipp; Juan Chavolla; Brian Smith
- Past members: Luis Espaillat; Daniel Feese; Miles McPherson; Gary Horrie; Johnannes Greer
- Website: hotactioncop.com

Hot Action Cop is an American rock band from Nashville, Tennessee. They are known for their hit single "Fever for the Flava". Long Island, New York-native Rob Werthner formed the band in 2001 with bassist Luis Espaillat, drummer Kory Knipp, and guitarist Tim Flaherty, and added keyboardist Daniel Feese in 2002 prior to the tour to support their self-titled debut album. Knipp left in December 2003 but remained friends with the band, subbing in on drums when needed, and rejoined in 2011. Espaillat left in 2006 to pursue other musical ventures. Bass guitarist Juan Chavolla joined in 2008, and after playing for several years without a keyboardist, multi-instrumentalist Brian Smith, a long-time friend of Werthner's, joined in 2012.

== History ==
=== Nutbag EP and Hot Action Cop (2001–2003) ===
The band's name came from the nickname that Werthner and his friends gave his ex-girlfriend's new boyfriend in the 1990s. He was an NYPD officer with a 1970s parted and feathered hairstyle. When they saw him they'd say, "here comes the hot action cop." Werthner cites musical influences including Red Hot Chili Peppers, Faith No More, The Eagles, New York hardcore, Southern hip-hop, punk, metal, reggae, and songwriters like Billy Joel and Elvis Costello.

Their first release, the EP Nutbag, was recorded in 2001 and released in 2002, and was only available to purchase at live shows or direct order from the band. The band released their debut album, the self-titled Hot Action Cop (produced by Michael Baker), on Lava Records/Atlantic Records in 2003. They achieved moderate success with the single "Fever for the Flava" despite limited radio support. The band toured extensively from October 2002 to December 2003 throughout the US, Canada, Germany, and England supporting bands such as Evanescence and Trapt, and including a spot on the northwestern leg of the 2003 Lollapalooza tour.

=== 2009 EP ===
Hot Action Cop released a six-song EP in 2009 with Werthner, Flaherty, Espaillat, Feese, and Nashville session drummer Miles McPherson.

=== Comfortably Numb (2012) ===
On May 1, 2012, the band released a cover of the Pink Floyd song "Comfortably Numb" on iTunes and Amazon. Recorded during a break from touring in 2003, the song features the original line-up of Werthner, Flaherty, Espaillat, Knipp, and Feese.

=== Listen Up! (2014) ===
The band's fourth release Listen Up! was released on February 7, 2014, available on hotactioncop.com, Spotify, and iTunes. A video was produced for the song "House of Pain". It was subsequently used in promos for House of DVF on the E! Network. The album was dedicated to Daniel Feese, who died in January 2014.

=== 2015–present ===
Every year since 2015, Hot Action Cop has headlined or co-headlined a private festival called Lampapalooza in Wauwatosa, Wisconsin, and has shared the stage with Sponge, Public Enemy, Run-DMC, EPMD, Rakim, Sir Mix-a-Lot, Bobby Bare Jr., and Elephant Room.

Timmy Flaherty has released two solo albums available on Spotify and iTunes, and is currently working on a third. He also plays in a Ramones tribute band with Daniel Feese's brother Dylan Feese on lead vocals. He has played S.I.T. Strings guitar strings since 2003.

Juan Chavolla joined the Louisville, Kentucky band Elephant Room, playing live and recording with Malcolm Springer in Nashville, Tennessee. Elephant Room and Hot Action Cop have played several shows together with Chavolla pulling double duty on bass guitar.

Rob Werthner and original producer Michael Baker have been working together on a new Hot Action Cop release for the last few years.

On June 3rd, 2022, the band opened for Joan Jett & The Blackhearts.

== Band members ==
=== Current members ===
- Rob Werthner – vocals, rhythm and lead guitars (2001–present)
- Timmy Flaherty – lead and rhythm guitars, backing vocals (2001–present)
- Kory Knipp – drums (2001–2003, 2007, 2011–present)
- Juan Chavolla – bass guitar (2008–present)
- Brian Smith - keyboards, rhythm guitar, vocals, saxophone (2012–present)

=== Former members ===
- Luis Espaillat – bass guitar (2001–2006)
- Daniel Feese – keyboards (2002–2007, died 2014)
- Miles McPherson – drums (2004–2006)
- Gary Horrie – drums (2007-2008)
- Johnannes Greer – drums (2008–2011)

== Discography ==
- Nutbag EP (2002)
- Hot Action Cop (2003) – No. 46 US Heatseekers
- 2009 EP (2009)
- Listen Up! (2014)

=== Singles ===
- "Fever for the Flava" (2003) – No. 38 US Alternative, No. 13 AUS
- "Don't Want Her to Stay" (2003) – No. 76 AUS
- "Comfortably Numb" (2012)
- "House of Pain" (2014)
- "Record Player" (2016)

=== Soundtracks, film and video game appearances ===
"Fever for the Flava" was featured in many films and also appeared in episodes of the shows King of the Hill, Malcolm in the Middle, Smallville, Boston Legal, and The Man Show. Werthner also wrote the theme song for the 2003 film S.W.A.T. Alternate clean versions of "Fever for the Flava" and the album version of "Goin' Down on It" as well as remixes of both of those songs appeared on the racing video game Need for Speed: Hot Pursuit 2. It was also voted No. 49 on MuchMusic's (later called Fuse) list of the '50 Most Controversial Videos'.

- The Hot Chick ("Fever for the Flava")
- Grind ("Goin' Down on It" and "Fever for the Flava")
- S.W.A.T. ("Samuel Jackson")
- American Wedding ("Fever for the Flava")
- The Real Cancun ("Fever for the Flava")
- Need for Speed: Hot Pursuit 2 ("Goin' Down on It", "Fever for the Flava")*
- Project Gotham Racing 2 ("Don't Want Her to Stay")*
- House of DVF ("House of Pain")

* Contains alternate versions of tracks
