= Going the Distance (2004 film) =

- Directed by: Mark Griffiths
- Written by: Eric Goodman; Kelly Senecal
- Produced by: Stephen Hegyes; Shawn Williamson
- Starring: Christopher Jacot; Joanne Kelly; Shawn Roberts; Mayko Nguyen; Ryan Belleville; Katheryn Winnick; August Schellenberg; Jason Priestley; Jackie Burroughs
- Cinematography: Gregory Middleton
- Edited by: Roger Mattiussi
- Music by: Patric Caird
- Production company: Brightlight Pictures
- Distributed by: Motion Picture Distribution LP
- Release date: August 20, 2004 (Canada)
- Running time: 93 min.
- Language: English
- Box office: $1.2 million

Going the Distance is a 2004 Canadian teen comedy film directed by Mark Griffiths, and written by Eric Goodman and Kelly Senecal. A road movie set across Canada, its tagline was They came. They saw. They came. The film was released in Canada as Going the Distance, but for American release the film's title was expanded to National Lampoon's Going the Distance. The Canadian DVD release retains its original release title. The film stars Christopher Jacot, Joanne Kelly, Shawn Roberts, Mayko Nguyen, Ryan Belleville, Katheryn Winnick, August Schellenberg, and Jason Priestley.

Produced by Brightlight Pictures and the first film underwritten in part by MuchMusic, Going the Distance was a brand extension for the music television channel and a foray into theatrical feature films by MuchMusic's then-corporate ownership CHUM Limited.

Recent changes to Telefilm Canada funding rewarded the producers of domestic films that were commercial successes in English Canada, and Going the Distance was a bid for such success.

== Plot summary ==
Nick (Jacot), whose life seemed to be going perfectly, realizes he may lose his girlfriend Trish, to a famous music producer (Priestley). He sets out on a roadtrip from Tofino in west coast to go to the MuchMusic Video Awards in Toronto. He sets out in his RV along with two rowdy buddies (Tyler and Dime), for the road trip of their lives.

== Cast ==
- Christopher Jacot as Nick, a lovestruck graduate
- Shawn Roberts as Tyler, Nick's surfer friend
- Ryan Belleville as Dime, Nick's friend, RV owner
- Joanne Kelly as Sasha, a hitchhiker
- Mayko Nguyen as Jill, Sasha's friend, a hitchhiker
- Katheryn Winnick as Trish, Nick's girlfriend
- Jason Priestley as Lenny Swackhammer, a big-shot producer, Trish's employer
- August Schellenberg as Emile, a shady man hired to stop Nick from meeting Trish
- Lynda Boyd as Toni, Nick's hippie mom
- Andrew Airlie as Jerry, Nick's hippie dad
- Matt Frewer as Farmer Joseph
- Jackie Burroughs as Mother Libby
- Lisa Marie Caruk as Judy, Lenny's assistant
- Crystal Lowe as French Waitress
- Jill Teed as Claire, a cougar
- Belinda Metz as Karma, a cougar

Additionally, Avril Lavigne, George Stroumboulopoulos, Gob, and Swollen Members all make cameo appearances as themselves at the music awards.

== Soundtrack ==
Going The Distance OST

Soundtrack album by Various Artists
- Released: 2004
- Genres: Punk Rock; Alternative

The Going The Distance OST was available soon after the movie was released.

No.	Title	Writer(s)	Performer(s)	Length
1.	"Open Your Eyes"	Deryck Whibley · Greig Nori	Sum 41	2:43
2.	"Break"	Clif Magness · Gabe Mantle · Theo Goutzinakis · Tom Thacker	Gob	3:21
3.	"Growing on Me"	Dan Hawkins · Ed Graham · Frankie Poullain-Patterson · Justin Hawkins	The Darkness	3:29
4.	"What a Wonderful World"	Bob Thiele · George David Weiss	Jersey	2:28
5.	"Cold Hard Bitch"	Cameron Muncey · Chris Cester · Nic Cester	Jet	4:03
6.	"License to Thrill"	Katy Rose · Kim Bullard	Katy Rose	2:57
7.	"So Far So Good"	Chad Kroeger · Gavin Brown · Ian Thornley · Jim Vallance	Thornley	3:21
8.	"Losing Grip" (live in Dublin)	Avril Lavigne · Clif Magness	Avril Lavigne	3:34
9.	"Not Ready to Go"	Colin MacDonald · Jack Syperek · John-Angus MacDonald · Sean Dalton	The Trews	3:02
10.	"Watch This"	Daniel Denton · Kiley Hendriks · Robin Hooper · Shane Bunting	Swollen Members	3:32
11.	"Sex"	Billy Mann · Kyprios	Kyprios	3:37
12.	"Better Days"	Bryan Trevitt · Daniel Denton · Golmorad Moshiri · Mishca Chillak^{1}	Sweatshop Union featuring Moka Only	3:16
13.	"Superfreak"	Alonzo Miller · Rick James	Lester	3:23
14.	"Knockin'"	Chad Horton · Kevin Cooper · Marc Wild · Niko Friesen	Motion Soundtrack	3:53

== Notes ==
1. Andrew Jenks, Corin Dingley and Kelvin Swaby were erroneously credited as the songwriters.
