= Nutbag =

Nutbag may refer to:

- Nutbag (film), a 2000 indie film
- Nutbag (EP), a 2002 EP by Hot Action Cop
