= Give Up the Grudge =

Single by Gob

from the album Foot in Mouth Disease
- Released: 2003
- Genre: Pop punk
- Length: 2:59
- Label: Nettwerk (Canada); Arista (international)
- Producer(s): Gob, Mark Trombino

Gob singles chronology
"No Regrets" (2001)	"Give Up the Grudge" (2003)	"Oh! Ellin" (2003)

Music video
- "Give Up the Grudge" on YouTube

"Give Up the Grudge" is a song by Canadian punk rock band Gob. It was released as the lead single from the band's 2003 album, Foot in Mouth Disease. The song was a hit in Canada, peaking at No. 11 on the country's rock chart. The song was featured on the soundtracks to the film American Wedding and the Madden NFL 2004 video game. The song was also featured on the MuchMusic compilation album, Big Shiny Tunes 8.

== Track listing ==
Australia and New Zealand single

1. "Give Up the Grudge" (radio edit) - 2:59
2. "Give Up the Grudge" (original explicit version) - 2:59
3. "My New Favorite Shoplifter" (previously unreleased) - 3:02
4. "Heavy Metal Shuffle" (previously unreleased) - 2:57
5. "L.A. Song" (from the F.U. EP) - 2:54
