= House of DVF =

- Genre: Reality television
- Starring: Diane von Furstenberg
- Country of origin: United States
- Original language: English
- No. of seasons: 2
- No. of episodes: 16

Production
- Executive producers: Chris Grant; Michael Rourke; Mioshi Hill; Corie Henson; Lenid Rolov; Diane von Furstenberg
- Camera setup: Multiple
- Running time: 42 minutes
- Production companies: Electus; Hud:sun Media

Original release
- Network: E!
- Release: November 2, 2014 – November 1, 2015

House of DVF is an American reality television series which premiered on November 2, 2014, on the E! cable network. Announced in August 2014, the series follows the life of fashion icon Diane von Furstenberg.

== Episodes ==
| Season | Episodes | Originally aired | |
| Season | Episodes | Season premiere | Season finale |
|---|---|---|---|
| 1 | 8 | November 2, 2014 | December 21, 2014 |
| 2 | 8 | September 13, 2015 | November 1, 2015 |
