= Nutbag (EP) =

EP by Hot Action Cop
- Released: 2002
- Genre: Funk metal; nu metal; rap metal
- Length: 15:19

Hot Action Cop chronology
Nutbag (2002)	Hot Action Cop (2003)

Nutbag is the debut EP by American funk rock band Hot Action Cop. It was released in 2002 and was only available to purchase at live shows or by direct order from the band.

== Track listing ==
No.	Title	Length
1.	"Don't Remember"	3:48
2.	"St. Tropez"	4:10
3.	"Handjob"	3:45
4.	"Dirt Bike Rider"	3:36
Total length:		15:19
