= Fever for the Flava =

2003 single by Hot Action Cop

Single by Hot Action Cop

from the album Hot Action Cop
- B-side: "Don't Remember"; "Dirt Bike Rider"
- Released: January 27, 2003
- Studio: Interzone; Oceanway (Nashville)
- Length: 4:09 (album version); 3:40 (single version)
- Label: Lava
- Songwriter: Rob Werthner
- Producer: Michael Baker

Hot Action Cop singles chronology
"Fever for the Flava" (2003)	"Don't Want Her to Stay" (2003)

"Fever for the Flava" is a song by American rock band Hot Action Cop. The line 'got the fever for the flava' was taken from a 1980 Pringles ad. The music video was directed by Marc Klasfeld.

== Critical reception ==
Johnny Loftus of AllMusic described the song as "harmless, high-fiving fun," making note of its "ear-splitting guitars and muscular drum fills". It was listed at number six on "The 50 Worst Songs of the 2000s" by The Village Voice. Christopher Weingarten wrote that it was "a soft-R ode to screeching nonsense words that mean genitals."

== Track listings and formats ==
- Australian CD single
1. "Fever for the Flava" (Radio Edit) – 3:40
2. "Don't Remember" – 3:48
3. "Dirt Bike Rider" – 3:37
- European CD single
1. "Fever for the Flava" (Radio Edit) – 3:40
2. "Don't Remember" – 3:48
3. "Dirt Bike Rider" – 3:37
4. "Fever for the Flava" (Video Enhancement) – 4:08
5. "Bonus Footage" (Video Enhancement) – 2:00

== Credits and personnel ==
Credits and personnel adapted from "Fever for the Flava" CD single liner notes.

- Rob Werthner – writing, guitar, vocals
- Tim Flaherty – guitar
- Luis Espaillat – bass
- Kory Knipp – drums
- Roach – keyboards
- Murray "Eh" Atkinson – guitar, keyboards
- Michael Baker – production
- Robert "Void" Caprio – recording at Interzone Studios and Oceanway Studios (Nashville)
- George Marino – mastering at Sterling Sound (New York City)

== Charts ==
=== Weekly charts ===
Chart (2003)	Peak position
Australia (ARIA)	13
Austria (Ö3 Austria Top 40)	48
Germany (GfK)	56
Scotland Singles (OCC)	42
UK Singles (OCC)	41
US Alternative Airplay (Billboard)	38
US Mainstream Rock (Billboard)	39

=== Year-end charts ===
Chart (2003)	Position
Australia (ARIA)	100

== Release history ==
Region	Date	Format(s)	Label(s)	Ref.
United States	January 27, 2003	Alternative radio	Lava	
United States	February 17, 2003	Mainstream rock; active rock radio	Lava	
Australia	May 5, 2003	CD	Lava	
