= Tom Thacker (musician) =

Canadian singer and guitarist (born 1973)

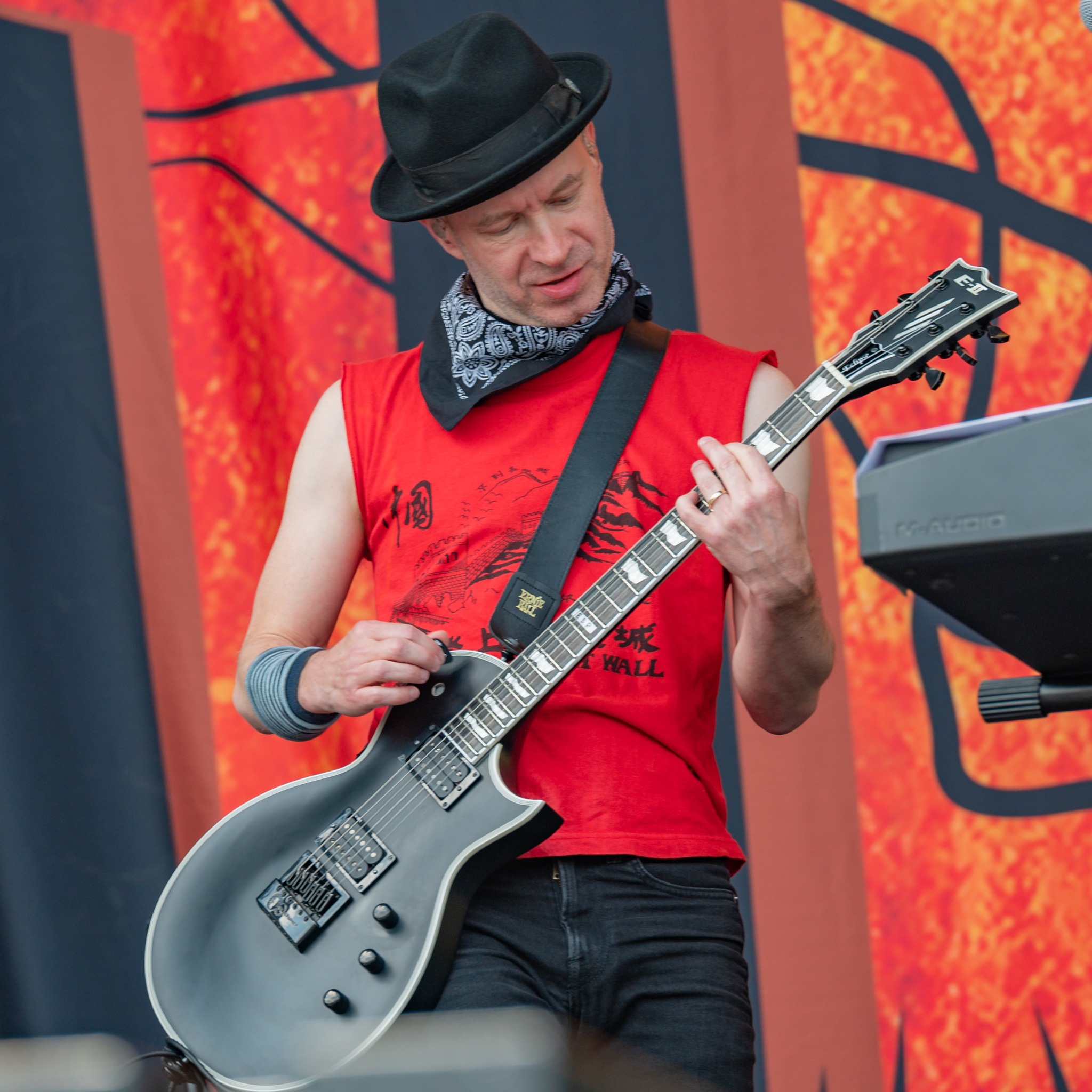
- Thacker performing at Rock im Park in 2023

Background information
- Also known as: Brown Tom; T'Aint
- Born: April 11, 1973 (age 53)
- Origin: Langley, British Columbia, Canada
- Genres: Pop punk; punk rock; alternative rock; hard rock; melodic hardcore; alternative metal
- Occupations: Musician; singer; songwriter; producer; actor
- Instruments: Guitar; vocals; keyboards; drums; accordion
- Member of: Gob
- Formerly of: Sum 41

Thomas William Arnold Thacker (born April 11, 1973), also known by the stage name Brown Tom, is a Canadian musician, songwriter, singer, actor, and record producer. He is the lead guitarist, lead singer and co-founder of the punk rock group Gob, as well as the former co-lead guitarist, keyboardist, and backing vocalist for Sum 41. Thacker formed Gob with Theo Goutzinakis in 1993. Following Dave Baksh's departure from Sum 41 on May 11, 2006, Thacker was recruited as their touring guitarist, and then became an official member in 2009. He remained with Sum 41 from then, even after Baksh rejoined the band in 2015, up until the group's disbandment in 2025.

Though primarily known as a vocalist, guitarist and keyboardist, Thacker's first instrument was the drums. Early in his career, he played drums in the Canadian pop punk band The McRackins, contributing to two studio releases. In addition to guitar, bass, keyboards and drums, Thacker also plays the accordion.

Thacker has been in the films Going the Distance and Sharp as Marbles. He also played himself in the Canadian animated series Being Ian (Season 1, Episode 24).

== Personal life ==
Thacker grew up in the suburbs of Vancouver in Langley, British Columbia. Since 2013, he is married to Mabel Ko, a medical doctor of Taiwanese descent, and they have a son together. He currently resides in New York City.

== Career ==
=== Gob (1993–present) ===
Thacker is one of the vocalists and guitarists in the punk rock band Gob. He formed the band in 1993 with Theo Goutzinakis, Wolfman Pat Integrity on drums, and Kelly Macaulay on bass. They released their self-titled EP in 1994. Since signing a deal with Nettwerk and EMI, the band has released six studio albums. Gabe Mantle joined the band as drummer in 1998. The current bassist Steven Fairweather joined in 2008. Gob was nominated for Juno Awards in 2000 and 2002. The band's most successful album is World According to Gob which is certified Gold in Canada. Their best-selling songs to date are "I Hear You Calling", "Soda", and "Banshee Song".

=== Sum 41 (2007–2025) ===
In early 2007, Thacker joined Sum 41 as touring guitarist, replacing former guitarist Dave Baksh. He also plays keyboards for Sum 41, and provides backing vocals. On June 26, 2009, in a special chat taking place on the website AbsolutePunk.net, Sum 41 frontman Deryck Whibley made it clear that Thacker was now an official member of the band and not just a touring member. On July 20, 2009, Steve Jocz, then drummer of Sum 41, stated on the band's official website that the band finished all their tour dates for 2009 and confirmed that Thacker would be appearing on the upcoming Sum 41 album. Thacker has since been featured on subsequent Sum 41 albums. He co-wrote the title track and first single on the 2011 album Screaming Bloody Murder. That year, Sum 41 received a Grammy Award nomination in the Best Hard Rock/Metal Performance category for the song "Blood in My Eyes". Thacker went by the name T'Aint (who replaced Steve Jocz's alter-ego Pain) in Sum 41's alter-ego heavy metal band Pain For Pleasure, where the members of Sum 41 would parody a 1980s metal band.

Even after Dave Baksh rejoined Sum 41 in 2015, Thacker has remained with the group, expanding Sum 41 to a five-piece. They have since released 13 Voices (2016), Order in Decline (2019), and their final album Heaven :x: Hell (2024).

=== Other musical projects and music production ===
Under the name Tommy, Tom Thacker played drums in the Canadian pop punk The McRackins for their 1995 album What Came First?. He returned again to play on their 1999 release Comicbooks and Bubblegum.

In 2013, Thacker toured with the Offspring filling in for guitarist Todd Morse. In July and August 2017 he toured with the Offspring again filling in for Morse who was filling in for lead guitarist Noodles.

Thacker has produced several critically well-regarded albums including By a Thread's self-titled third album and Boids' Quel Drag.

== Discography ==
=== Gob ===
- Too Late... No Friends (1995)
- How Far Shallow Takes You (1998)
- The World According to Gob (2000)
- Foot in Mouth Disease (2003)
- Muertos Vivos (2007)
- Apt. 13 (2014)

=== Sum 41 ===
- Screaming Bloody Murder (2011) – co-wrote the first single
- 13 Voices (2016)
- Order in Decline (2019)
- Heaven :x: Hell (2024)

Pain For Pain

• BAD News (guitarist)

=== Compilations ===
- Various Artists – FUBAR: The Album (2002)

=== Music Production ===
- By a Thread – s/t (2011) (producer)
- Floodlight – Floodlight (2009) (producer)
- Boids – Quel Drag (2020) (producer)

Guitarist for Sum 41
since 2006
