= Brand New Unit =

Canadian hardcore punk band

- Origin: Surrey, British Columbia, Canada
- Genres: Hardcore punk Melodic Hardcore
- Years active: 1991-2000
- Labels: 3 Minute Mile Records, Excursion Records, Creative Man Disc, BYO Records, HeartFirst Records, Burning Heart Records, Modern Radio Record Label
- Members: Gary Lavallee†; Jinx Stringer; Ben Hughes; Garnet Kulhavy†; Gabe Mantle

Brand New Unit, commonly known as BNU, was a Canadian Hardcore punk band from suburban Vancouver, British Columbia.

== Lineup ==
- Gary Lavallee, vocals
- Jinx Stringer, guitar
- Ben Hughes, bass
- Garnet Kulhavy, drums; llater replaced by Gabe Mantle of Gob)

== History ==
The band formed in 1991 in Surrey, British Columbia, and started out playing locally and in Vancouver.

In 1992, they were winners of CITR-FM's 1982 SHiNDiG live performance contest, which awarded them some studio time. They used it to record their first EP, Summertime. Influences of 7 Seconds and Dag Nasty can be heard on Summertime with Kulhavy, while later recordings feature a more post-hardcore feel with hard-hitting live elements.

In 1993, they were included on Crank It Up - Volume 11, part of Thrasher Magazine's Skate Rock series. In 1994, they released their first album, Under The Big Top.

Brand New Unit toured constantly and expanded their following into the US market. In 1995, they released three EPs and, by 1997, had enough material to release a compilation album, Looking Back Again.

In 1998, the band released the album Diddly Squat through the Creative Man label. In 1999, they released a split EP with Kill Sadie, and were included in a VML Records compilation album with The Pist, Supernova and The Gain. They released one more EP in 1999 and broke up in 2000.

In February 2010, Brand New Unit played a reunion show in Vancouver. They continued to play occasionally, last appearing in Victoria in 2018.

In October 2021, Gary Lavallee passed away; his cause of death was not released. In November 2021, Garnet Kulhavy died of COVID-19.

== Discography ==
Albums

- Under The Big Top (1994), Excursion Records
- Looking Back Again (1997), BYO Records
- Diddley Squat (1998), Creative Man Disc

EPs

- Summertime 7" (1992), 3 Minute Mile Records
- All For Nothing 7" (1995), HeartFirst Records
- Quickdraw Richy Rich (1995), HeartFirst Records
- No Heroes (1995), HeartFirst Records
- Kill Sadie + Brand New Unit Split 7" (1999), Modern Radio Record Label
- Empty Useless Air (1999), Burning Heart Records
