= Gob (band) =

Canadian punk rock band

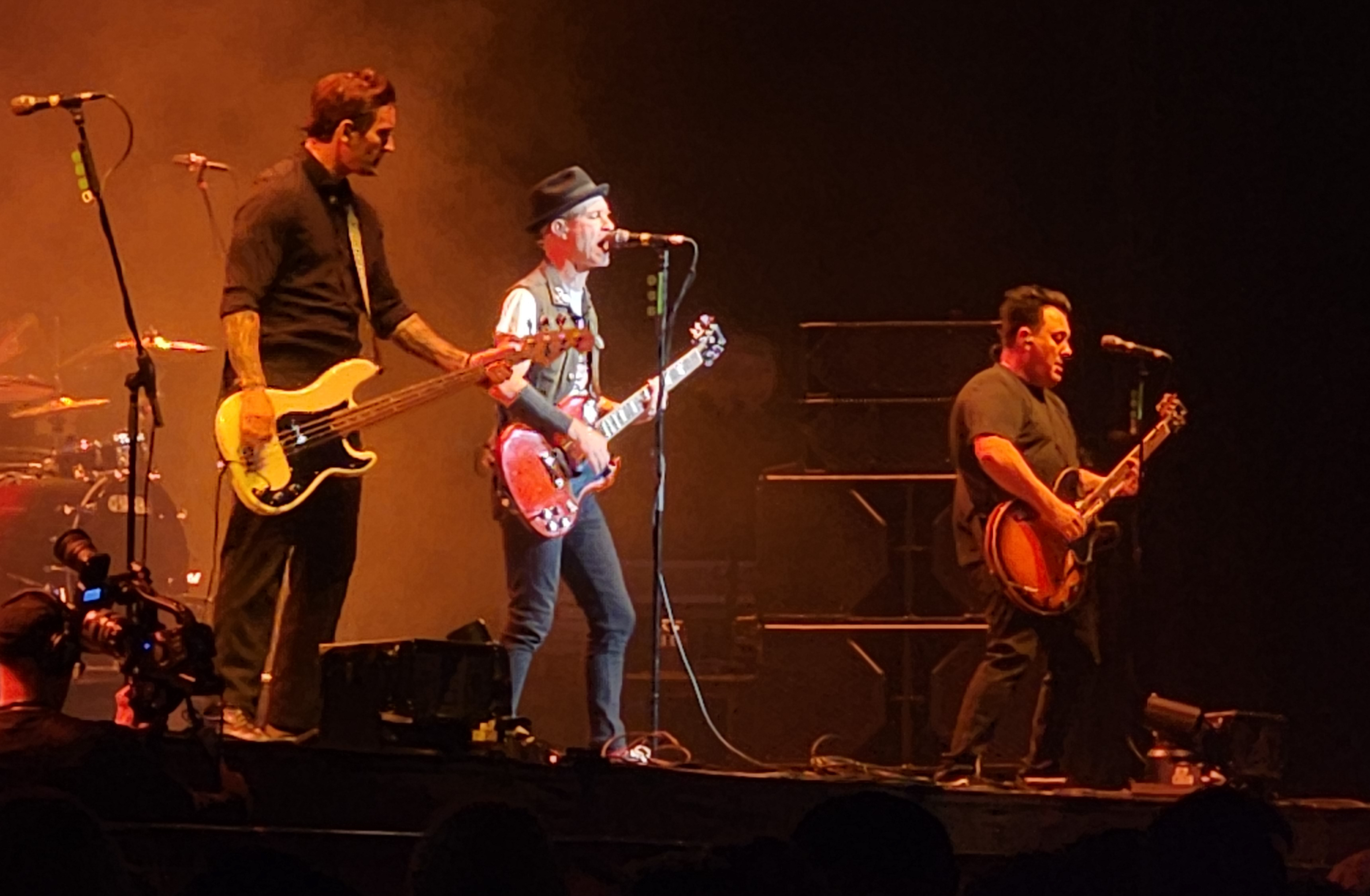
- Gob performing in 2023

Background information
- Origin: Langley, British Columbia, Canada
- Genres: Punk rock; pop-punk
- Years active: 1993–present
- Labels: Nettwerk, Aquarius/EMI, New Damage Records, Landspeed, Mint, Fearless, Arista
- Members: Tom Thacker; Theo Goutzinakis; Gabe Mantle; Steven Fairweather
- Past members: Tyson Maiko; Craig Wood; Patrick "Wolfman Pat" Paszana; Jamie Fawkes; Kelly Macauley; Happy Kreter

Gob is a Canadian punk rock band from Langley, British Columbia, formed in 1993. The band consists of Tom Thacker, Theo Goutzinakis, Gabe Mantle, and Steven Fairweather. They were nominated for a Juno Award for best new group in 2000, and received another Juno nomination for best video in 2002. Gob's most successful album is World According to Gob. Their best-selling songs to date are "I Hear You Calling", "Soda", and "Banshee Song". They have been featured in movies, TV shows, and many sporting video games such as NHL 2002, NHL 2003, NHL 2004, and Madden NFL 2004 with songs such as "Oh! Ellin", "I've Been Up These Steps", "Sick With You" (both re-mixed for the game), "I Hear You Calling", and "Give Up the Grudge". The band has appeared at several music festivals, the most well-known being the Vans Warped Tour.

== History ==
=== Gob, Too Late... No Friends and How Far Shallow Takes You (1994–2000) ===
Gob formed in 1993 consisting of Tom Thacker as lead guitarist and vocalist, Theo Goutzinakis as rhythm/co-lead guitarist and vocalist, Patrick "Wolfman Pat" Paszana on drums, and Kelly Macauley on bass guitar. Thacker and Goutzinakis often switched between lead vocals with Goutzinakis playing the occasional lead guitar line.

During the early days of the band, Tom usually kept his place as lead guitar while Theo had more vocal duties and focused on rhythm guitar. They recorded their self-titled Gob in 1993 and released it in 1994 on Landspeed Records with the odd numbered tracks sung by Theo and the even numbered tracks sung by Tom. The tracks 1, 2 and 8 were re-recorded and released on their next album Too Late... No Friends.

Kelly Macauley was replaced by Jamie Fawkes and in 1995 Gob released Too Late... No Friends on Mint Records and Landspeed Records. It was later reissued by Nettwerk in 2000. After the release of Too Late... No Friends, Gob had replaced many bassists until they found Craig Wood. "Wolfman" Pat left the band due to his daughter being born before the recording of "How Far Shallow Takes You", so the band replaced him with Gabe Mantle, former member of a Vancouver Punk band Brand New Unit.

With a newly formed band, Gob released How Far Shallow Takes You. It was home to a heavier sound with a better production value, mature lyrics focusing on personal and political issues and a growth in musicianship. It was released on Fearless records in 1998 but re-released in 1999 on Landspeed because of conflicts with Fearless. In 1999, Gob signed with Nettwerk records, who re-released the How Far Shallow Takes You album in May of the same year.

=== The World According to Gob and Foot in Mouth Disease (2000–2004) ===
Gob released World According to Gob, in 2001. This album was Gob's most successful album to date; featuring one of their biggest hits "I Hear You Calling." Musically, the sound was a continuation of their previous 1990s-era punk rock sound. Other singles released from World According To include "For The Moment", "That's The Way" and "No Regrets". The album was certified Gold by the CRIA in May 2002.

In 2002, Gob recorded the compilation F.U. EP as a promotional record for their new label Arista Records. "Ming Tran" was released as a single for the EP which also featured a re-recorded version of a classic Gob song "Soda", two exclusive tracks, "L.A Song" and "Sick With You," as well as tracks from the band's previous three studio releases. The band followed up the F.U. EP with their fourth studio album Foot in Mouth Disease, which was released on Arista Records in April 2003. "Give Up the Grudge" was released as the lead single from the album and was a hit in Canada, peaking at No. 11 on Canada's Rock chart. Other singles from Foot in Mouth Disease included "Oh! Ellin", "Ming Tran" and "This Evil World". Unlike the band's other albums, Theo only provides lead vocals on the album's twelfth (eleventh on Canadian version) track "Bully". The album has been described as having a much heavier and aggressive tone than the band's previous work.

In 2003, Gob filmed a cameo for the Canadian teen comedy Going The Distance (2004) where they appeared as themselves performing at the MuchMusic Video Awards. Swollen Members and Avril Lavigne also appeared in the film.

=== Craig Wood's departure, Steven Fairweather's arrival and Muertos Vivos (2004–2008) ===
In 2004, longtime bassist Wood left the band to play guitar for Canadian superstar Avril Lavigne. The band have since recruited a bassist known only to fans as "Peter Pan" or, more commonly, Tyson, as Gob's members are on a "first-name basis" with their fans. (All albums credit the musicians simply by their first names, as well.)

Gob's friendship with several Canadian bands has come up often in the past few years. During Gob's downtime, Thacker has played lead guitar for Sum 41 live since 2007 because of the departure of their lead guitarist, Dave Baksh. Since then, Thacker has become Baksh's permanent replacement in Sum 41.

Their fifth full-length album, Muertos Vivos, was released on Cobraside November 27, 2007, in the U.S. and was released in Canada on Aquarius Records October 23. They recruited Tyson Maiko as their bassist. The album is Gob's heaviest and most serious album to date.

The album's first single was "We're All Dying". They shot the video for "We're All Dying", as well as for their second single "Underground", on September 4 and 5, 2007, in downtown Vancouver. The album's final single was "Banshee Song".

In mid-2008, Maiko left the band and was replaced by Steven Fairweather who was a long time friend of the band. Even having them record most of Muertos Vivos in his childhood home. Fairweather had played in past bands including Revelation Records' post-hardcore band By a Thread, and appeared on demo versions of songs by sub pops' punk rock band the Black Halos.

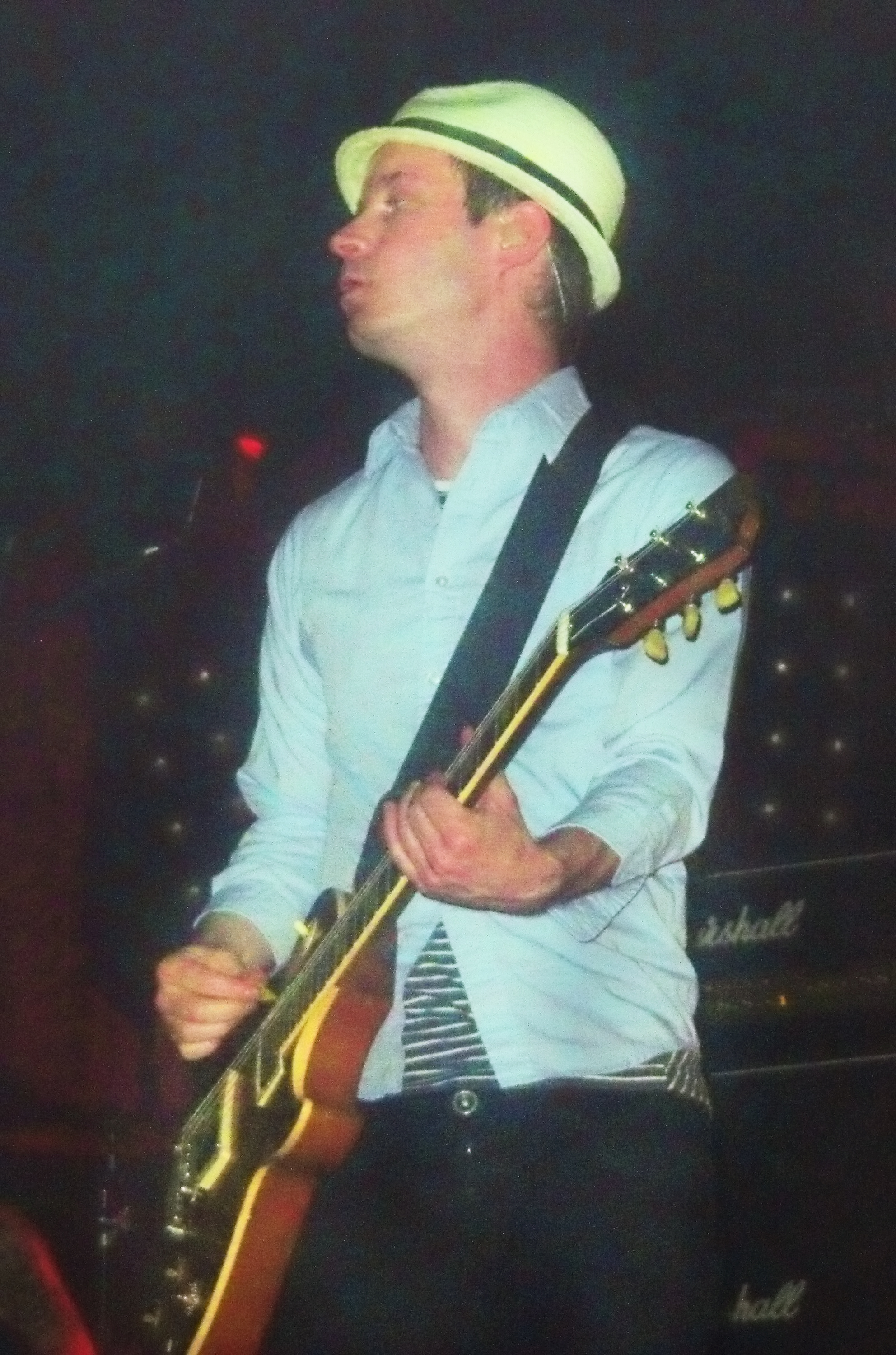
Tom Thacker, lead vocalist and guitarist for Gob

=== Apt. 13 (2009–present) ===
In early 2009, the band toured Canada, after which, in April, Thacker joined up with Sum 41 for their Japanese and US tour. It was also confirmed that Thacker was officially a member of Sum 41. He stayed with the band even after the return of Dave "Browsound" Baksh in 2015.

In an interview with AMP, guitarist Theo Goutzinakis revealed that the band had already started writing for their sixth studio album.

Gob released the album Apt. 13 in August 2014. The band also announced a Canadian tour, with Canadian punk band Seaway.

== Band members ==
=== Current ===
- Tom Thacker – lead and backing vocals, lead guitar (1993–present)
- Theo Goutzinakis – rhythm guitar, lead and backing vocals (1993–present)
- Gabe Mantle – drums, percussion, backing vocals (1998–present)
- Steven Fairweather – bass, backing vocals (2008–present)

=== Former ===
- Kelly Macauley – bass (1993–1995)
- Jamie Fawkes – bass (1995–1996)
- Happy Kreter – bass (1996–1998)
- Patrick "Wolfman Pat" Paszana – drums, percussion, backing vocals (1993–1998)
- Craig Wood – bass, backing vocals (1998–2004)
- Tyson "Peter Pan" Maiko – bass, backing vocals (2005–2008)

== Discography ==
=== Studio albums ===
Title	Album details	Peak chart positions			Certifications
Title	Album details	CAN	AUS	US	Certifications
Too Late... No Friends	Release date: June 1995; Label: Nettwerk, Mint Records, Landspeed; Formats: CD, DL	—	—	—	
How Far Shallow Takes You	Release date: December 8, 1998; Label: Fearless, Landspeed, Nettwerk; Formats: CD, DL	—	—	—	
The World According to Gob	Release date: October 10, 2000; Label: Nettwerk; Formats: CD, DL	30	—	194	MC: Gold
Foot in Mouth Disease	Release date: April 1, 2003; Label: Nettwerk (Canada), Arista (International), BMG (Japan); Formats: CD, DL, CD+DVD	—	90	132	MC: Gold
Muertos Vivos	Release date: November 27, 2007; Label: Aquarius (International), Cobraside (Vinyl), BMG (Japan); Formats: CD, LP, DL	—	—	—	
Apt. 13	Release date: August 26, 2014; Label: New Damage; Formats: CD, LP, DL	—	—	—	
"—" denotes releases that did not chart

=== Extended plays ===
Title	Details
Gob	Release date: 1994; Label: Landspeed Records; Formats: CD
Green Beans and Almonds	Release date: 1995; Label: Landspeed Records; Formats: 7"
Dildozer	Release date: 1995 Label: Nefer Records; Formats: 7"
Has Fil Flipped? (Split with McCrackins)	Release date: 1997; Formats: 7"
F.U. EP	Release date: October 6, 2002; Label: Nettwerk (Canada), Arista (International), BMG (Japan); Formats: CD, DL

== See also ==
- Juno Awards of 2002 Best Video
