= Theo Goutzinakis =

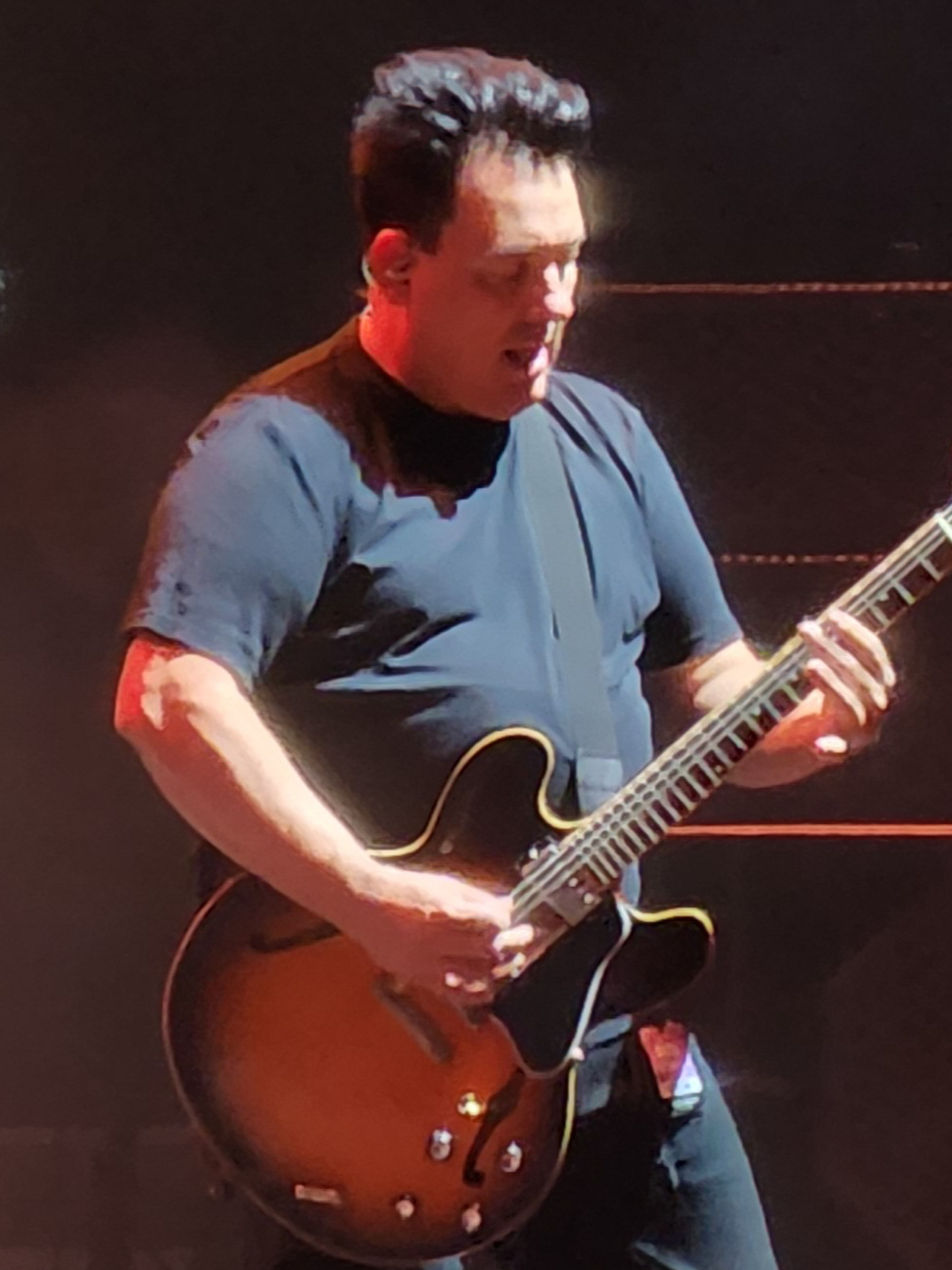
- Goutzinakis performing with Gob in 2023

Background information
- Born: 19 July 1971 (age 55)
- Origin: Vancouver, British Columbia, Canada
- Genres: Punk rock, pop punk, alternative rock, alternative metal
- Instruments: Guitar, Vocals, Drums, Bass
- Label: Aquarius Records

Theo Goutzinakis (born 19 July 1971) is a founding member of the Canadian punk band, Gob. He is the guitarist and vocalist. He is of Greek descent. He has also appeared in the movies Going the Distance and Sharp as Marbles. He mainly plays Gibson Les Paul and Gibson ES models. He served as a vocalist, a guitarist, and a bassist in many other bands before he started Gob with co-vocalist/guitarist Tom Thacker.

Theo appears in EA Sports' NHL 2004 under the name "Theo Gobzinakis".
