= Gabe Mantle =

Canadian drummer (born 1975)

- Born: Gabriel Julian Mantle; October 25, 1975 (age 50)
- Origin: Vancouver, British Columbia, Canada
- Genres: Punk rock, pop punk, alternative rock, hardcore punk
- Instruments: Drums, Acoustic guitar
- Label: Aquarius Records

Gabriel "Gabe" Mantle (born October 25, 1975) is a Canadian drummer, mostly known as the drummer of the pop punk group Gob. He has also been a part of a Vancouver hardcore band Brand New Unit's assembly as well as the pop band, Bloody Chicletts and old school punk band, Death Sentence.

He also played drums on the .married album by Canadian band The Tom Glenne 5.5 and lent his voice to the Canadian animated television series Being Ian.

Gabe appears in EA Sports' NHL 2004 under "Gabe Metal".
