= Don't Call It a Sum-Back Tour =

2016–17 concert tour by Sum 41

- Tour by Sum 41
- Associated album: 13 Voices
- Start date: October 5, 2016
- End date: August 27, 2017
- Legs: 5
- No. of shows: 96

Sum 41 concert chronology
- 20th Anniversary Tour (2016); Don't Call It a Sum-Back Tour (2016–17); Does This Look Infected?: 15th Anniversary Tour (2018)

The Don't Call It a Sum-Back Tour is the ninth headlining concert tour by the Canadian rock band, Sum 41. The tour was launched to support the band's sixth studio album, 13 Voices (2016). Beginning October 2016, the tour played nearly 100 shows in the Americas, Europe and Asia.

== Background ==
Approaching the end of their run on the Warped Tour, the tour was announced in last August. During breaks in their schedule, the band toured alongside Papa Roach and Pierce the Veil.

== Opening acts ==
- Senses Fail (North America, select dates)
- As It Is (North America, select dates)
- Paerish (Europe—Leg 1, select dates)
- Hollerado (Europe—Leg 1, select dates)
- The Living End (Budapest)
- Trash Boat (Budapest)
- Itchy (Ravensburg)

== Setlist ==
The following setlist was obtained from the concert held on February 18, 2017, at the Palladium in Cologne, Germany. It does not represent all concerts for the duration of the tour.

1. "Instrumental Sequence"
2. "A Murder of Crows"
3. "Fake My Own Death"
4. "The Hell Song"
5. "Over My Head (Better Off Dead)"
6. "Goddamn I'm Dead Again"
7. "Underclass Hero"
8. "Screaming Bloody Murder"
9. "There Will Be Blood"
10. "War"
11. "Motivation" (contains elements of "The Bitter End")
12. "Instrumental Sequence"
13. "Grab the Devil by the Horns and Fuck Him Up the Ass"
14. "We're All to Blame"
15. "Walking Disaster"
16. "Makes No Difference"
17. "With Me"
18. "God Save Us All (Death to Pop)"
19. "Instrumental Sequence"
20. "No Reason"
21. "We Will Rock You"
22. "Still Waiting"
23. "In Too Deep"

Encore

24. "Crash"
25. "Pieces"
26. "Welcome to Hell"
27. "Fat Lip"
28. "Pain for Pleasure"

== Tour dates ==
List of 2016 concerts
Date	City	Country	Venue
October 5, 2016	Lake Buena Vista	United States	House of Blues
October 7, 2016	Fort Lauderdale	United States	Revolution Live
October 8, 2016	St. Petersburg	United States	State Theatre
October 9, 2016	Atlanta	United States	The Masquerade
October 11, 2016	Boston	United States	House of Blues
October 12, 2016	Philadelphia	United States	The Fillmore Philadelphia
October 13, 2016	Sayreville	United States	Starland Ballroom
October 14, 2016	New York City	United States	PlayStation Theater
October 17, 2016	Montreal	Canada	MTelus
October 18, 2016	Toronto	Canada	Phoenix Concert Theatre
October 19, 2016	Detroit	United States	Saint Andrew's Hall
October 21, 2016	Chicago	United States	House of Blues
October 22, 2016	Minneapolis	United States	Mill City Nights
October 25, 2016	Edmonton	Canada	Union Hall
October 26, 2016	Calgary	Canada	MacEwan Hall Ballroom
October 28, 2016	Vancouver	Canada	Commodore Ballroom
October 29, 2016	Seattle	United States	Neptune Theatre
October 30, 2016	Portland	United States	Hawthorne Theatre
November 1, 2016	San Francisco	United States	Regency Ballroom
November 2, 2016	Riverside	United States	Riverside Municipal Auditorium
November 4, 2016	Scottsdale	United States	Livewire
November 5, 2016	San Diego	United States	House of Blues
November 6, 2016	Los Angeles	United States	Mayan Theater
December 5, 2016	Buenos Aires	Argentina	Groove
December 7, 2016	Porto Alegre	Brazil	Opinião
December 8, 2016	São Paulo	Brazil	Tropical Butantã
December 10, 2016	Monterrey	Mexico	Escena
December 11, 2016	Guadalajara	Mexico	C3 Stage
December 12, 2016	Mexico City	Mexico	Pepsi Center WTC
December 17, 2016^{[A]}	Lima	Peru	Estadio de la UNMSM

List of 2017 concerts
Date	City	Country	Venue
January 16, 2017	Talence	France	Espace Médoquine
January 17, 2017	Barcelona	Spain	Sala Razzmatazz
January 18, 2017	Madrid	Spain	The Ring
January 20, 2017	Lisbon	Portugal	Coliseu dos Recreios
January 21, 2017	Bilbao	Spain	Sala Santana 27
January 22, 2017	Ramonville	France	Le Bikini
January 24, 2017	Nîmes	France	Paloma
January 25, 2017	Marseille	France	Cabaret Aléatoire
January 26, 2017	Villeurbanne	France	Le Transbordeur
January 28, 2017	Padua	Italy	Gran Teatro Geox
January 29, 2017	Milan	Italy	Mediolanum Forum
January 31, 2017	Rome	Italy	Atlántico Live
February 2, 2017	Lausanne	Switzerland	Salle Métropole
February 3, 2017	Zurich	Switzerland	Komplex 457
February 4, 2017	Vienna	Austria	Bank Austria Halle
February 6, 2017	Prague	Czech Republic	Roxy
February 7, 2017	Warsaw	Poland	Klub Proxima
February 9, 2017	Berlin	Germany	Columbiahalle
February 10, 2017	Leipzig	Germany	Haus Auensee
February 11, 2017	Munich	Germany	Muffathalle
February 16, 2017	Wiesbaden	Germany	Kulturzentrum Schlachthof
February 17, 2017	Nuremberg	Germany	Löwensaal
February 18, 2017	Cologne	Germany	Palladium
February 20, 2017	Clermont-Ferrand	France	La Coopérative de mai
February 21, 2017	Rouen	France	Le 106
February 22, 2017	Paris	France	Zénith Paris
February 24, 2017	Birmingham	England	O_{2} Academy
February 25, 2017	Manchester	England	Manchester Academy
February 26, 2017	Leeds	England	O_{2} Academy
February 28, 2017	Glasgow	Scotland	Barrowland Ballroom
March 2, 2017	London	England	O_{2} Academy Brixton
March 3, 2017	Bristol	England	O_{2} Academy
March 4, 2017	Nottingham	England	Rock City
March 6, 2017	Southampton	England	O_{2} Guildhall
March 8, 2017	Brussels	Belgium	Ancienne Belgique
March 9, 2017	Esch-Sur-Alzette	Luxembourg	Rockhal
March 10, 2017	Tilburg	Netherlands	013
March 12, 2017	Lille	France	L'Aéronef
March 13, 2017	Hamburg	Germany	Große Freiheit 36
March 15, 2017	Stockholm	Sweden	Fryshuset Arenan
March 17, 2017	Helsinki	Finland	Tavastia Club
March 19, 2017	Moscow	Russia	Stadium Live
April 8, 2017^{[B]}	Dana Point	United States	Doheny State Beach
June 2, 2017^{[C]}	Nürnberg	Germany	Zeppelinfeld
June 3, 2017^{[D]}	Nürburg	Germany	Nürburgring
June 4, 2017^{[E]}	Toul	France	Grande Scène au Boulevard Aristide Briand
June 5, 2017^{[F]}	Landgraaf	Netherlands	Megaland
June 7, 2017^{[G]}	Crans-près-Céligny	Switzerland	Plage de Crans
June 8, 2017^{[H]}	Interlaken	Switzerland	Flugplatz Interlaken
June 9, 2017^{[I]}	Derby	England	Donington Park
June 11, 2017	Mannheim	Germany	Maimarktclub
June 12, 2017	Linz	Austria	Posthof
June 14, 2017	Budapest	Hungary	Budapest Park
June 16, 2017	Ravensburg	Germany	Oberschwabenklub
June 17, 2017^{[J]}	Monza	Italy	Parco di Monza
June 18, 2017^{[K]}	Dessel	Belgium	Kastelsedijk
June 21, 2017	Stockholm	Sweden	Stora Scenen
July 20, 2017^{[L]}	Belleville	Canada	Empire Square
July 21, 2017^{[M]}	Rimouski	Canada	Parc Beauséjour
July 22, 2017^{[N]}	Saguenay	Canada	Zone portuaire de Chicoutimi
August 11, 2017^{[O]}	Rouyn-Noranda	Canada	Place Edmund-Horne
August 19, 2017^{[P]}	Osaka	Japan	Fumin Kyosai Super Arena
August 20, 2017^{[P]}	Chiba	Japan	International Exhibition Hall 4
August 24, 2017	Jurong East	Singapore	Zepp@BIGBOX
August 26, 2017^{[P]}	Shanghai	China	Shen Di Ecology Park
August 27, 2017^{[Q]}	Kaohsiung	Taiwan	Kaohsiung Exhibition Center

Festivals and other miscellaneous performances

^{A} This concert was a part of "Vivo x el Rock"
^{B} This concert was a part of the "Sabroso Craft Beer, Taco & Music Festival"
^{C} This concert was a part of "Rock im Park"
^{D} This concert was a part of "Rock am Ring"
^{E} This concert was a part of "Le Jardin du Michel"
^{F} This concert was a part of the "Pinkpop Festival"
^{G} This concert was a part of the "Caribana Festival"
^{H} This concert was a part of the "Greenfield Festival"
^{I} This concert was a part of the "Download Festival"
^{J} This concert was a part of the "Independent Days Festival"
^{K} This concert was a part of the "Graspop Metal Meeting"
^{L} This concert was a part of "Empire Rockfest"
^{M} This concert was a part of "Les Grandes Fêtes Telus"
^{N} This concert was a part of the "Festival des Bières du Monde de Saguenay"
^{O} This concert was a part of "Osisko en lumière"
^{P} This concert was a part of the "Summer Sonic Festival"
^{Q} This concert was a part of "FireBall Fest"

Cancellations and rescheduled shows

October 8, 2016	Tampa, Florida	Orpheum Theater	Moved to the State Theatre in St. Petersburg, Florida
November 2, 2016	Anaheim, California	House of Blues	Moved to the Riverside Municipal Auditorium in Riverside, California
December 6, 2016	Santiago, Chile	Club Hípico de Santiago	Cancelled. This concert was a part of the "Frontera Festival
January 15, 2017	Málaga, Spain	Sala Paris15	Cancelled
January 18, 2017	Madrid, Spain	Sala Riviera	Moved to The Ring
February 3, 2017	Zürich, Switzerland	Volkshaus	Moved to Komplex 457
February 9, 2017	Berlin, Germany	Astra Kulturhaus	Moved to the Columbiahalle
February 10, 2017	Leipzig, Germany	Täubchenthal	Moved to the Haus Auensee

=== Box office score data ===
Venue	City	Tickets sold / Available	Gross revenue
PlayStation Theater	New York City	2,150 / 2,150 (100%)	$52,328
