= Tour of the Setting Sum =

2024–25 concert tour by Sum 41

- Tour by Sum 41
- Location: Asia; Europe; North America
- Associated album: Heaven :x: Hell
- Start date: February 27, 2024
- End date: January 30, 2025
- Legs: 6
- No. of shows: 117
- Supporting acts: The Interrupters; Joey Valence & Brae; The Scratch; Many Eyes; Drug Church; The Bronx; Neck Deep; PUP; Gob

Sum 41 concert chronology
- Chuck: 15th Anniversary Tour (2019); Tour of the Setting Sum (2024–2025)

The Tour of the Setting Sum was the final concert tour by the Canadian rock band Sum 41, in support of their eighth and final studio album, Heaven :x: Hell.

== Background ==
On March 23, 2022, the band announced their eighth and final studio album, Heaven :x: Hell, which was later released on March 29, 2024. Prior to the album's release, the band announced in May 2023 that they would be disbanding following the release of Heaven :x: Hell and a final headlining tour.

Tour dates for the final tour were announced on January 16, 2024, with their final show taking place on January 30, 2025 at Scotiabank Arena in Toronto. Additional tour dates for Canada were later announced on March 25, 2024. The band was announced for the 2024 edition of Good Things on 22 August 2024, and announced four tour dates in Brisbane, Adelaide, Melbourne and Sydney as Good Things Sideshows on 27 October 2024. However, the Australian run would be cancelled last minute due to Whibley being hospitalized with pneumonia.

== Set list ==
This set list was taken from the show in Seoul, South Korea, on February 27, 2024. It does not represent all shows throughout the tour.

1. "The Hell Song"
2. "Motivation"
3. "Over My Head (Better Off Dead)"
4. "No Reason"
5. "Waiting on a Twist of Fate"
6. "Some Say"
7. "Underclass Hero"
8. "Landmines"
9. "Rise Up"
10. "We're All to Blame"
11. "Screaming Bloody Murder"
12. "Walking Disaster"
13. "With Me"
14. "Makes No Difference"
15. "Summer"
16. "My Direction" / "No Brains" / "Rhythms" / "All Messed Up"
17. "Fake My Own Death"
18. "We Will Rock You" (Queen cover)
19. "Pieces"
20. "Fat Lip"
21. "Still Waiting"
  Encore I
22. "Best of Me"
23. "Mr. Amsterdam"
24. "In Too Deep"
  Encore II
25. "So Long Goodbye"

== Tour dates ==
List of 2024 concerts
Date (2024)	City	Country	Venue	Opening act(s)
February 27	Seoul	South Korea	YES24 Live Hall	—N/a
February 28	Seoul	South Korea	YES24 Live Hall	—N/a
March 1	Jakarta	Indonesia	Uptown Park	—N/a
March 2	Yogyakarta	Indonesia	Kridosono Stadium	—N/a
March 4	Singapore		Star Theatre	—N/a
March 5	Kuala Lumpur	Malaysia	Megastar Arena	—N/a
March 7	Guangzhou	China	Voice Republic	—N/a
March 9	Shanghai	China	Bandai Namco Dream Hall	—N/a
March 10	Nanjing	China	1701 Livehouse Max	—N/a
March 11	Nanjing	China	1701 Livehouse Max	—N/a
March 14	Sapporo	Japan	Zepp	—N/a
March 16 (Note: The concert on March 16, 2024 was a part of Punkspring.)	Tokyo	Japan	Makuhari Messe	—N/a
March 18	Yokohama	Japan	Zepp	—N/a
March 19	Nagoya	Japan	Zepp	—N/a
March 21	Hiroshima	Japan	Blue Live	—N/a
March 22	Fukuoka	Japan	Zepp	—N/a
March 23 (Note: The concert on March 23, 2024 was a part of Punkspring.)	Osaka	Japan	Intex Osaka	—N/a
April 19	Omaha	United States	The Astro	The Interrupters; Joey Valence & Brae
April 20	Wichita	United States	Wave	The Interrupters; Joey Valence & Brae
April 21	Kansas City	United States	Uptown Theater	The Interrupters; Joey Valence & Brae
April 23	Minneapolis	United States	The Armory	The Interrupters; Joey Valence & Brae
April 24	St. Louis	United States	The Factory	The Interrupters; Joey Valence & Brae
April 26	Grand Rapids	United States	GLC Live	The Interrupters; Joey Valence & Brae
April 27	Milwaukee	United States	Rave	The Interrupters; Joey Valence & Brae
April 29	Baltimore	United States	Pier 6	The Interrupters; Joey Valence & Brae
April 30	Boston	United States	MGM Music Hall at Fenway	The Interrupters; Joey Valence & Brae
May 1	Portland	United States	Cross Insurance Arena	The Interrupters; Joey Valence & Brae
May 4	Asbury Park	United States	Stone Pony	The Interrupters; Joey Valence & Brae
May 6	Brooklyn	United States	Paramount Theater	The Interrupters; Joey Valence & Brae
May 8	Reading	United States	Santander Arena	The Interrupters; Joey Valence & Brae
May 9	Raleigh	United States	Red Hat Amphitheater	The Interrupters; Joey Valence & Brae
May 11	Atlanta	United States	Coca-Cola Roxy	The Interrupters; Joey Valence & Brae
May 12 (Note: The concert on May 12, 2024, was a part of Welcome to Rockville.)	Daytona Beach	United States	Daytona International Speedway	The Interrupters; Joey Valence & Brae
May 14	Nashville	United States	Ryman Auditorium	The Interrupters; Joey Valence & Brae
May 15	Charlotte	United States	Skyla Credit Union Amphitheatre	The Interrupters; Joey Valence & Brae
May 17 (Note: The concert on May 17, 2024, was a part of Sonic Temple.)	Columbus	United States	Historic Crew Stadium	The Interrupters; Joey Valence & Brae
May 18	Philadelphia	United States	Skyline Stage at The Mann	The Interrupters; Joey Valence & Brae
May 19	Norfolk	United States	The NorVa	The Interrupters; Joey Valence & Brae
June 13 (Note: The concert on June 13, 2024, was a part of Greenfield Festival.)	Matten bei Interlaken	Switzerland	Flugplatz Interlaken	—N/a
June 14 (Note: The concert on June 14, 2024, was a part of Rock for People.)	Hradec Králové	Czech Republic	Park 360	—N/a
June 15 (Note: The concert on June 15, 2024, was a part of Nova Rock Festival.)	Nickelsdorf	Austria	Pannonia Fields	—N/a
June 16 (Note: The concert on June 16, 2024, was a part of Download Festival.)	Castle Donington	England	Donington Park	—N/a
June 19	Dublin	Ireland	Fairview Park	The Scratch
June 21 (Note: The concert on June 21, 2024, was a part of Southside Festival.)	Neuhausen ob Eck	Germany	take-off GewerbePark	—N/a
June 22 (Note: The concert on June 22, 2024, was a part of Slam Dunk Festival France.)	Lyon	France	Halle Tony Garnier	—N/a
June 23 (Note: The concert on June 23, 2024, was a part of Hurricane Festival.)	Scheeßel	Germany	Eichenring	—N/a
June 26 (Note: The concert on June 26, 2024, was a part of Resurrection Fest.)	Viveiro	Spain	Campo de fútbol Celeiro	—N/a
June 28 (Note: The concert on June 28, 2024, was a part of Jera On Air.)	Ysselsteyn	Netherlands	Agrobaan	—N/a
June 29 (Note: The concert on June 29, 2024, was a part of Mission Ready Festival.)	Geiselwind	Germany	Eventzentrum Strohofer	—N/a
June 30 (Note: The concert on June 30, 2024, was a part of Garorock.)	Marmande	France	Plaine de la Filhole	—N/a
July 4 (Note: The concert on July 4, 2024, was a part of La Nuit de l'Erdre.)	Nort-sur-Erdre	France	Port Mulon	—N/a
July 5 (Note: The concert on July 5, 2024, was a part of Rock Werchter.)	Werchter	Belgium	Festivalpark	—N/a
July 6 (Note: The concert on July 6, 2024, was a part of Eurockéennes.)	Belfort	France	Presqu'île de Malsaucy	—N/a
July 7 (Note: The concert on July 7, 2024, was a part of Ruhrpott Rodeo.)	Hünxe	Germany	Flugplatz Schwarze Heide	—N/a
July 9 (Note: The concert on July 9, 2024, was a part of I-Days.)	Milan	Italy	Ippodromo del Galoppo di San Siro	—N/a
July 11 (Note: The concert on July 11, 2024, was a part of Les Déferlantes Festival.)	Le Barcarès	France	Les Jardins du Lydia	—N/a
July 12 (Note: The concert on July 12, 2024, was a part of Mad Cool.)	Madrid	Spain	Iberdrola Music	—N/a
July 13 (Note: The concert on July 13, 2024, was a part of NOS Alive.)	Lisbon	Portugal	Passeio Marítimo de Algés	—N/a
September 3	San Francisco	United States	SF Masonic Auditorium	The Interrupters; Many Eyes
September 4	San Francisco	United States	SF Masonic Auditorium	The Interrupters; Many Eyes
September 6	Portland	United States	Alaska Airlines' Theater of the Clouds	The Interrupters; Many Eyes
September 7	Seattle	United States	WaMu Theater	The Interrupters; Many Eyes
September 8	Garden City	United States	Revolution Concert House & Event Center	The Interrupters; Many Eyes
September 10	Salt Lake City	United States	The Lot at The Complex	The Interrupters; Many Eyes
September 11	Morrison	United States	Red Rocks Amphitheatre	The Interrupters; Many Eyes
September 12	Waukee	United States	Vibrant Music Hall	The Interrupters; Many Eyes
September 14	Detroit	United States	Detroit Masonic Temple	The Interrupters; Many Eyes
September 15	Cuyahoga Falls	United States	Blossom Music Center	The Interrupters; Many Eyes
September 17	Moon	United States	UPMC Events Center	The Interrupters; Many Eyes
September 18 (Note: The concert on September 18, 2024, was a part of Riot Fest Late Night.)	Chicago	United States	Concord Music Hall	Drug Church; Many Eyes
September 20 (Note: The concert on September 20, 2024, was a part of Riot Fest.)	Chicago	United States	Douglass Park	—N/a
September 23	Miami	United States	The Fillmore Miami Beach at Jackie Gleason Theater	The Interrupters; Many Eyes
September 24	Orlando	United States	Orlando Amphitheater	The Interrupters; Many Eyes
September 26 (Note: The concert on September 26, 2024, was a part of Louder Than Life.)	Louisville	United States	Highland Festival Grounds	—N/a
September 28	Cedar Park	United States	H-E-B Center at Cedar Park	The Interrupters; Many Eyes
September 29	Houston	United States	713 Music Hall	The Interrupters; Many Eyes
September 30	Irving	United States	Toyota Music Factory	The Interrupters; Many Eyes
October 2	Phoenix	United States	Arizona Financial Theatre	The Interrupters; Many Eyes
October 3	Inglewood	United States	YouTube Theater	The Interrupters; Many Eyes
October 4	Las Vegas	United States	PH Live	The Interrupters; Many Eyes
October 21	's-Hertogenbosch	Netherlands	Brabanthallen	The Bronx
October 23	Brussels	Belgium	ING Arena	The Bronx
October 24	Caen	France	Zénith de Caen	The Bronx
October 26	Leeds	England	First Direct Arena	The Bronx
October 27	Glasgow	Scotland	OVO Hydro	The Bronx
October 28	Manchester	England	Co-op Live	The Bronx
October 30	Nottingham	England	Motorpoint Arena	The Bronx
October 31	London	England	Wembley Arena	The Bronx
November 2	Cardiff	Wales	Utilita Arena	The Bronx
November 4	Berlin	Germany	Uber Arena	The Bronx
November 5	Hamburg	Germany	Barclays Arena	The Bronx
November 6	Dortmund	Germany	Westfalenhalle	Neck Deep
November 8	Leipzig	Germany	Arena Leipzig	Neck Deep
November 9	Łódź	Poland	Atlas Arena	Neck Deep
November 10	Prague	Czech Republic	O_{2} Arena	Neck Deep
November 12	Budapest	Hungary	Papp László Sportaréna	Neck Deep
November 13	Vienna	Austria	Wiener Stadthalle	Neck Deep
November 14	Munich	Germany	Olympiahalle	Neck Deep
November 16	Casalecchio di Reno	Italy	Unipol Arena	Neck Deep
November 17	Rome	Italy	Palazzo dello Sport	Neck Deep
November 19	Madrid	Spain	WiZink Center	Neck Deep
November 20	Barcelona	Spain	Palau Sant Jordi	Neck Deep
November 21	Geneva	Switzerland	Arena de Genève	Neck Deep
November 23	Paris	France	Paris La Défense Arena	Neck Deep

List of 2025 concerts
Date (2025)	City	Country	Venue	Opening act(s)
January 10	Victoria	Canada	Save on Foods Memorial Centre	PUP; Gob
January 11	Vancouver	Canada	Rogers Arena	PUP; Gob
January 13	Kelowna	Canada	Prospera Place	PUP; Gob
January 16	Calgary	Canada	Scotiabank Saddledome	PUP; Gob
January 17	Edmonton	Canada	Rogers Place	PUP; Gob
January 18	Saskatoon	Canada	Sasktel Centre	PUP; Gob
January 20	Winnipeg	Canada	Canada Life Centre	PUP; Gob
January 23	St. Catharines	Canada	Meridian Centre	PUP; Gob
January 24	Ottawa	Canada	Canadian Tire Centre	PUP; Gob
January 25	Laval	Canada	Place Bell	PUP; Gob
January 27	London	Canada	Canada Life Place	PUP; Gob
January 28	Toronto	Canada	Scotiabank Arena	PUP; Gob
January 30	Toronto	Canada	Scotiabank Arena	PUP; Gob

=== Cancelled dates ===
List of cancelled concerts
Date	City	Country	Venue	Reason
December 4, 2024	Brisbane	Australia	Fortitude Music Hall	Whibley's hospitalization with pneumonia
December 6, 2024 (Note: The December 6, 7 and 8, concerts were set to be a part of Good Things.)	Melbourne	Australia	Flemington Racecourse	Whibley's hospitalization with pneumonia
December 7, 2024	Sydney	Australia	Centennial Park	Whibley's hospitalization with pneumonia
December 8, 2024	Brisbane	Australia	Brisbane Showgrounds	Whibley's hospitalization with pneumonia
December 10, 2024	Adelaide	Australia	Adelaide Entertainment Centre	Whibley's hospitalization with pneumonia
December 12, 2024	Melbourne	Australia	Margaret Court Arena	Whibley's hospitalization with pneumonia
December 14, 2024	Sydney	Australia	Hordern Pavilion	Whibley's hospitalization with pneumonia

== Personnel ==
- Deryck Whibley – lead vocals, rhythm guitar, piano
- Dave Baksh – lead guitar, backing vocals
- Tom Thacker – rhythm and lead guitars, keyboards, backing vocals
- Jason McCaslin – bass, backing vocals
- Frank Zummo – drums
