= Land mine (disambiguation) =

A land mine is an explosive device activated by the victim.

- Also used for an explosive charge in tunnel warfare.
- Also used in the UK to describe a parachute mine during the Blitz.

Land mine may also refer to:

- Landmine, several characters in the Transformers universe
  - Landmine, the Autobot Pretender from Generation 1
  - Landmine, the veteran Autobot soldier from the Unicron Trilogy
  - Landmine, the Autobot Sector Seven assault buggy from the 2007 movie
- Landmine, the developer code name for Mozilla Firefox Version 3.0
- Landmine, an independent alternative rock band from Palo Alto, CA
- A woman of undesirable appearance, in spite of good physical health. Popularized by the show Jersey Shore.
- "Landmine", a 2020 song by Polaris from The Death of Me
- "Landmine", a 2023 song by Post Malone from Austin
- "Landmines", a 2023 single by Sum 41 from Heaven :x: Hell
- "Landmines", a 2015 song by Chaos Divine from Colliding Skies
- "Landmines", a 2025 song by Architects from The Sky, the Earth & All Between
- Landmine type (or Jirai Kei), a form of Japanese subculture

== See also ==
- Mine (disambiguation)
