= Diamonds of the Night: Vol. 1 =

Album by Sum 41 and Deryck Whibley

Studio album by Sum 41 and Deryck Whibley
- Released: March 19, 2027
- Recorded: c. 2019
- Label: Rise

Sum 41 chronology
Heaven :x: Hell (2024)	Diamonds of the Night: Vol. 1 (2027)

Singles from Diamonds of the Night: Vol. 1
- 1. "With Me (First Dance Version)" Released: November 18, 2026

Diamonds of the Night: Vol. 1 is an upcoming acoustic re-recording album credited to Canadian rock band Sum 41 and its former lead vocalist, Deryck Whibley, scheduled to be released on March 19, 2027, through Rise Records. The album consists of twelve reimagined versions of songs from the band's discography, featuring arrangements incorporating acoustic guitar, live strings and piano. Originally recorded by Whibley around 2019, the project is scheduled for release following the band's disbandment in 2025.

== Background and recording ==
Whibley had envisioned creating stripped-down versions of Sum 41's songs since approximately 2011. Around 2019, while the band was still active, he recorded acoustic reinterpretations of material from its discography. The recordings remained unreleased for several years before Whibley decided to make them publicly available.

In November 2025, following the conclusion of Sum 41's farewell tour and subsequent disbandment, Whibley revealed during an interview with Rock Sound at the Warped Tour in Orlando, Florida, that he had completed recording an album of acoustic versions of Sum 41 songs. He also expressed interest in embarking on an acoustic tour featuring material from the band's discography, although no concrete plans had been made at the time.

== Composition ==
The album features rearrangements of twelve previously released Sum 41 songs, incorporating acoustic guitar, live strings and piano. The track selection draws from seven of the band's eight studio albums, spanning All Killer No Filler (2001) to Heaven :x: Hell (2024).

== Release and promotion ==
On November 12, 2026, Sum 41 teased a re-recorded version of "With Me", originally released on the band's 2007 album Underclass Hero. Titled "With Me (First Dance Version)", the recording was scheduled for release on November 18, 2026.

On November 18, 2026, Whibley officially announced Diamonds of the Night: Vol. 1 in a statement published on Sum 41's official Facebook page. He discussed the project's origins and his decision to release the previously recorded material, emphasizing that the album did not constitute a reunion of the band. The album was announced for release on March 19, 2027, through Rise Records, with pre-orders and pre-saves made available alongside the announcement.

The album is scheduled to be released in CD and vinyl formats, with both editions crediting Sum 41 and Whibley as the artists.

== Touring ==
On November 18, 2026, Whibley announced the Diamonds of the Night Tour, his first solo tour, in support of the album. The tour is scheduled to take place in April 2027, consisting of ten shows across Germany, Italy, France, the Netherlands and the United Kingdom. The performances will feature reimagined versions of Sum 41 songs in the style of the album.

== Track listing ==
Diamonds of the Night: Vol. 1 track listing
No.	Title	Length
1.	"Still Waiting" (Diamond Version)
2.	"Blood in My Eyes" (Diamond Version)
3.	"With Me" (First Dance Version)
4.	"Fat Lip" (Diamond Version)
5.	"The Hell Song" (Diamond Version)
6.	"House of Liars" (Diamond Version)
7.	"Over My Head (Better Off Dead)" (Diamond Version)
8.	"Walking Disaster" (Diamond Version)
9.	"Dopamine" (Diamond Version)
10.	"Landmines" (Diamond Version)
11.	"Pieces" (Diamond Version)
12.	"Twisted by Design" (Diamond Version)
