= Never There =

Never There may refer to:

- "Never There" (Cake song), 1998
- "Never There" (Sum 41 song), 2019
- "Never There", a song by Hoobastank from their 2003 album The Reason
