= 13 Voices =

Studio album by Sum 41
- Released: October 7, 2016
- Recorded: June 2014–April 2016
- Studios: Studio Mr. Biz (Whibley's home studio); Legends Studios; EastWest Studios (Los Angeles)
- Genres: Heavy metal; punk rock; alternative metal; alternative rock
- Length: 37:43
- Label: Hopeless
- Producer: Deryck Whibley

Sum 41 chronology
Screaming Bloody Murder (2011)	13 Voices (2016)	Order in Decline (2019)

Singles from 13 Voices
- 1. "Fake My Own Death" Released: June 28, 2016; 2. "War" Released: August 25, 2016

13 Voices is the sixth studio album by Canadian rock band Sum 41, released on October 7, 2016. It is the first of two albums by the band to be released through independent label Hopeless Records. It is also Sum 41's first album to feature drummer Frank Zummo, who replaced original drummer Steve Jocz, and their first album to feature guitarist Tom Thacker. The album also features the return of longtime lead guitarist Dave "Brownsound" Baksh (who left in 2006 and returned in 2015). The album is also their first as a five-piece band. On May 11, 2016, the band announced that they had signed to Hopeless Records to release the crowd-funded project.

== Background ==
On July 9, 2015, the band launched a PledgeMusic campaign for its comeback album. On July 23, 2015, the band played its comeback show at the Alternative Press Music Awards, which featured former lead guitarist Dave "Brownsound" Baksh, joining the group on stage nine years after officially leaving the band. Sum 41 announced Baksh's official return on August 14, 2015, and also announced that he will join the band in the studio. On December 26, 2015, Sum 41 teased two new songs on its Instagram account. On January 1, 2016, frontman Deryck Whibley revealed that the album was nearing completion via the band's social media.

The band performed on the 2016 Warped Tour. On April 19, 2016, Whibley published that Sum 41 was finishing the album. On May 11, 2016, Sum 41 announced its signing to Hopeless Records.

The release's final song "Twisted by Design" replaces "With Me" (from 2007's Underclass Hero) as the band's longest song to date, with a running time of 5 minutes and 28 seconds.

== Development ==
On November 26, 2012, the band members revealed that they were taking a break from touring in 2013 to begin work on a new record. On April 18, 2013, drummer Steve Jocz announced he would be leaving the band via his official Facebook page, leaving Deryck Whibley as the sole founding member of the band. In an interview on February 7, 2014, Whibley revealed that the band had possibly found a new drummer and would be premiering new music "soon". The album would have been the band's first with Whibley and bassist Jason "Cone" McCaslin as the only two remaining members from the group's "classic line-up", until Baksh's return in 2015, which also marks his first album with Sum 41 since 2004's Chuck. The album is the band's first to feature drummer Frank Zummo, as well as their first album as a five-piece.

On May 16, 2014, Whibley posted on an entry on his personal website, explaining that he had liver and kidney failure due to extensive drinking. He explained that he was in treatment in the hospital for a month, and upon release, he would be taking care of his health, while continue working on new music. He also stated that he had some ideas for new songs already, and that the band would be soon starting to make a new album. On June 9, 2014, Whibley has stated on his personal Facebook page that he was working on new Sum 41 music out of his home studio to get ready to record some new music soon. On June 29, 2014, Whibley posted an entry on his website, entitled "getting ready to record drums", with photos of him setting up the drum kit for recording.

== Promotion and release ==
On June 6, 2016, Sum 41 announced that the group's sixth studio album would be titled 13 Voices and that the album is scheduled for release on October 7, 2016. The cover art and tracklist were also revealed that same day. "Fake My Own Death", the band's first new song in five years, was released on June 28, 2016. The song was released as an instant grat for pre-ordering the album on iTunes. The song was performed on The Late Show with Stephen Colbert on October 3, 2016. Deryck stated that the first official single had not yet been picked and the band wanted to put out new music to hold the fans over. The album's first official single "War", was released on August 25, 2016. The album's eighth track, "God Save Us All (Death to Pop)" was released (along with a live music video) on September 29, 2016. In early 2017, Sum 41 invited fans via Facebook and Instagram for the shooting of the music video for "Goddamn I'm Dead Again" in San Pedro, California, released May 3, 2017.

=== Tour ===
The Don't Call It a Sum-Back Tour is a concert tour that was announced on August 8, 2016. It started October 5 and concluded on March 19, 2017.

== Musical style ==
13 Voices has been stated as being punk rock, heavy metal, alternative metal, alternative rock, and as moving even further away from their pop-punk roots. Bradley Zorgdrager of Exclaim! described it as "a fusion between metal and radio-friendly pop punk".

== Critical reception ==
Professional ratings
Aggregate scores
Source	Rating
Metacritic	76/100
Review scores
Source	Rating
AllMusic	4/5 stars
Currently Streaming	9.2/10
Dork	3/5 stars
Exclaim!	6/10
Kerrang!	4/5 stars
Punknews.org	3.5/5 stars
Rock Sound	5/10

13 Voices has received positive reviews from music critics. At Metacritic, which assigns a normalized rating out of 100 to reviews from mainstream critics, the album has an average score of 76 out of 100, which indicates "generally favorable reviews" based on 5 reviews.

== Commercial performance ==
The album debuted at number 22 on the US Billboard 200, with first week sales of 16,100 copies. The album was the ninth highest selling album of the week (pure sales). It has reached higher positions than the band's sophomore album, especially in the UK where it was their first Top 20 albums since "All Killer No filler". Impala awarded the album with a double gold award for 150,000 sold copies across Europe.

== Track listing ==
All tracks are written by Deryck Whibley, except where noted.

No.	Title	Writer(s)	Length
1.	"A Murder of Crows"		3:04
2.	"Goddamn I'm Dead Again"		3:22
3.	"Fake My Own Death"		3:14
4.	"Breaking the Chain"	Whibley; Mike Green	4:03
5.	"There Will Be Blood"	Whibley; David Zonshine; Frank Zummo; Adam Alt; Robert Alt	3:29
6.	"13 Voices"		4:32
7.	"War"	Whibley; Mike Green	3:29
8.	"God Save Us All (Death to Pop)"		3:53
9.	"The Fall and the Rise"		3:09
10.	"Twisted by Design"	Whibley; Matt Squire	5:28
Total length:			37:43

Deluxe edition bonus tracks
No.	Title	Writer(s)	Length
11.	"Better Days"		2:15
12.	"Black Eyes"		3:14
13.	"War" (Acoustic)	Whibley; Green	3:43
14.	"Breaking the Chain" (Acoustic)	Whibley; Green	3:48
Total length:			50:43

Japanese edition bonus tracks
No.	Title	Writer(s)	Length
11.	"War" (feat. Taka of One Ok Rock)	Whibley; Green	3:29
12.	"Better Days"		2:15
13.	"Black Eyes"		3:14
14.	"War" (Acoustic)	Whibley; Green	3:43
15.	"Breaking the Chain" (Acoustic)	Whibley; Green	3:48
16.	"Radio Radio" (Elvis Costello cover)	Elvis Costello	2:52
Total length:			57:11

== Personnel ==
Sum 41

- Deryck Whibley – vocals, guitars, piano, keyboards
- Dave "Brownsound" Baksh – guitars
- Tom Thacker – guitars
- Jason "Cone" McCaslin – bass
- Frank Zummo – drums

Production

- Deryck Whibley – production, engineering
- Tom Lord-Alge – mixing
- Ted Jensen – mastering
- Jimmy Pfann – assistant engineering (Legends Studios)
- William Delaney – assistant engineering (EastWest Studios)
- Andy Ford – assistant engineering (EastWest Studios)
- Michael Freeman – assistant engineering (EastWest Studios)
- Tyler Shields – assistant engineering (EastWest Studios)

Design

- Michael Cortada – cover artwork
- Chris Hansen – art, layout

== Charts ==
Chart performance for 13 Voices
Chart (2016)	Peak position
Australian Albums (ARIA)	13
Austrian Albums (Ö3 Austria)	13
Belgian Albums (Ultratop Flanders)	38
Belgian Albums (Ultratop Wallonia)	37
Canadian Albums (Billboard)	6
Dutch Albums (Album Top 100)	69
French Albums (SNEP)	51
German Albums (Offizielle Top 100)	9
Hungarian Albums (MAHASZ)	32
Italian Albums (FIMI)	18
Japanese Albums (Oricon)	17
New Zealand Heatseekers Albums (RMNZ)	7
Scottish Albums (Official Charts)	17
Spanish Albums (PROMUSICAE)	49
Swiss Albums (Schweizer Hitparade)	14
UK Albums (Official Charts)	16
UK Rock & Metal Albums (OCC)	4
US Billboard 200	22
US Independent Albums (Billboard)	5
US Top Alternative Albums (Billboard)	6
US Top Rock Albums (Billboard)	7
