= Never There (Sum 41 song) =

Single by Sum 41

from the album Order in Decline
- Released: June 18, 2019
- Recorded: 2019
- Studio: Studio Mr. Biz (Deryck's home studio), Los Angeles
- Genre: Pop rock; soft rock
- Length: 4:20
- Label: Hopeless
- Songwriter: Deryck Whibley
- Producer: Deryck Whibley

Sum 41 singles chronology
"A Death in the Family" (2019)	"Never There" (2019)	"45 (A Matter of Time)" (2019)

"Never There" is a song by Canadian rock band Sum 41, written by Deryck Whibley. It was released as the third single from the album Order in Decline on June 18, 2019, a week after the release of the album's second single, "A Death in the Family".

== Background ==
In an interview Deryck Whibley described the writing process, he said:

I never wanted to write this song, it just kind of poured out of me. I tried to fight it at first but there was no stopping it. I could tell I was writing about my dad, who I've never met and throughout my life it has always been a subject that I don't really think about or care about. It has never really bothered me and when I started thinking about why it never bothered me, I realized it was because my mum was so great and I have such a loving relationship with her. She was so strong as a single mother for my whole life that I never needed to think about my dad.

— Deryck Whibley

In an interview with Kerrang, he added that the song speaks not only of getting to know his father, but also of the link of a "something missing" that he alone can share in the world and how his mother managed to be such a good single mother.

== Music video ==
The music video for the song was released on June 18, 2019, produced by Selfish Entertainment, and directed by John Asher. It features pro skateboarder Carl Jr Collins (better known as CJ Collins), actress Holly Lynch and the singer of the band, Deryck Whibley.

== Personnel ==
- Deryck Whibley – lead vocals, rhythm guitar, piano, production, engineering, mixing
- Dave Baksh – lead guitar, backing vocals
- Tom Thacker – rhythm and lead guitars, backing vocals
- Jason McCaslin – bass guitar, backing vocals
- Frank Zummo – drums

== Charts ==
Chart performance for "Never There"
Chart (2019–20)	Peak position
US Mainstream Rock (Billboard)	32
