= Out for Blood (song) =

Single by Sum 41

from the album Order in Decline
- Released: April 24, 2019
- Recorded: 2019
- Studio: Studio Mr. Biz (Deryck's home studio), Los Angeles
- Genre: Punk metal; skate punk
- Length: 3:36
- Label: Hopeless
- Songwriters: Deryck Whibley; Mike Green
- Producer: Deryck Whibley

Sum 41 singles chronology
"War" (2016)	"Out for Blood" (2019)	"A Death in the Family" (2019)

"Out for Blood" is a song by Canadian rock band Sum 41, written by Deryck Whibley and Mike Green. It was released as the lead single from the album Order in Decline on April 24, 2019.

== Music video ==
The video was directed by Lee Levin and features several misfit people in their day to day jobs with situations where someone frustrates them; like getting rejected by a door bouncer, handing out mail and given an empty coffee cup in an office (realising his job is so unfulfilling), having someone walking through a just cleaned floor, doing a tattoo in an undesired region of a client and having a patron with her young daughter in a roadhouse-style restaurant rejecting served food. After the first chorus, they all lash out in anger. The fans all arrive at the band's performance, turning it into a concert and during the guitar solo, they get into hyper violent moshing, ending up with them all smiling, showing off their bleeding facial cuts by the end.

== Charts ==
Chart performance for "Out for Blood"
Chart (2019)	Peak position
Canada Rock (Billboard)	10
US Hot Rock & Alternative Songs (Billboard)	41
US Rock & Alternative Airplay (Billboard)	46

== Release history ==
Country	Date	Format	Label	Ref.
Various	April 24, 2019	Digital download; streaming	Hopeless	
