= Heaven :x: Hell =

Studio album by Sum 41
- Released: March 29, 2024
- Recorded: 2022–2023
- Studios: Sofitel Brussels Hotel (Brussels); Sheraton Gateway Hotel (Toronto); Studio Mr. Bus (London); Hotel Le Royal (Luxembourg City); Studio Mr. Biz (Deryck Whibley's home studio); EastWest (Hollywood); United (Hollywood)
- Genres: Pop-punk; heavy metal; skate punk; alternative rock; alternative metal
- Length: 55:02
- Label: Rise
- Producers: Mike Green; Deryck Whibley

Sum 41 chronology
Order in Decline (2019)	Heaven :x: Hell (2024)	Diamonds of the Night: Vol. 1 (2027)

Singles from Heaven :x: Hell
- 1. "Landmines" Released: September 27, 2023; 2. "Rise Up" Released: December 12, 2023; 3. "Waiting on a Twist of Fate" Released: February 22, 2024; 4. "Dopamine" Released: March 29, 2024

Heaven :x: Hell (Note: The :x: is pronounced as "and".) is the eighth and final studio album by the Canadian rock band Sum 41, released on March 29, 2024, through Rise Records. A double album, Heaven :x: Hell is divided into two discs; the first disc, Heaven, features a return to the pop-punk style of the band's early career, while the second disc, Hell, follows the heavy metal sound the band pursued in subsequent years. It is their only release on Rise, having departed from independent label Hopeless Records in 2023.

The band released the lead single "Landmines" on September 27, 2023. A second single, "Rise Up", was released on December 12, 2023. The third single, "Waiting on a Twist of Fate", was released on February 22, 2024. "Dopamine" was released as the fourth single on March 29, 2024, the same day the album was released. A final music video was released for "Radio Silence" on April 1, 2025, two days after Sum 41's induction into the Canadian Music Hall of Fame.

== Background ==
On February 22, 2022, the band announced a U.S. tour with Simple Plan called the Blame Canada tour that ran from April to August 2022.

On March 23, 2022, the band announced the album and its musical styles, with the "Heaven" side throwing back to their earlier pop-punk style, and the "Hell" side continuing their recent heavier metal sound. However, they did not reveal a release date. Vocalist Deryck Whibley described it as "somewhat of a nod to Black Sabbath", referring to that band's album of the same name:

Obviously we know the record and love the record, and we knew that, you know, calling it this was... We kind of looked at it as "Well, you know what? They've had it for like, about 42 years. We'll take it from here".

On February 22, 2023, it was announced that the band would be playing at When We Were Young on October 22, 2023.

On May 8, 2023, the band announced that they would be disbanding after releasing the album and subsequently touring in support of it throughout 2024; the tour titled Tour of the Setting Sum began on January 12, 2024, at the Uptown Park in Jakarta, Indonesia, and concluded at the Scotiabank Arena in Toronto, Ontario, Canada, on January 30, 2025. They were supported by the Interrupters on North American dates.

On September 19, 2023, it was announced that Whibley was hospitalized for COVID-19, and pneumonia, which led to the risk of heart failure. The next day, it was announced that he was responding well to his treatments and was discharged from the hospital.

The band played "Landmines" on Jimmy Kimmel Live! on February 8, 2024.

The CD and vinyl of the album became available in the Netherlands and Belgium on March 15, 2024, two weeks before the official worldwide release, therefore causing a worldwide leak.

== Singles and videos ==
The lead single, "Landmines", was released on September 27, 2023, along with a music video and the announcement of their signing to Rise Records. The second single, "Rise Up", was released on December 12, 2023, along with its music video and the album's release date. The third single, "Waiting on a Twist of Fate", was released on February 22, 2024, along with a music video. The fourth single, "Dopamine", was released on March 29, 2024, along with a music video. On April 1, 2025, the band released a video for "Radio Silence", marking the final video for the album and their career as a whole.

== Composition ==
Heaven :x: Hell is a double album split between pop-punk and heavy metal. The Heaven side of the album has been compared to pop-punk sound of their debut studio album, All Killer No Filler (2001). The Hell side has been compared to heavier sound of their third studio album, Chuck (2004). The album has also been described as skate punk, alternative rock, and alternative metal.

Frontman Deryck Whibley originally wrote a lot of the Heaven songs for other artists, but decided to keep them for himself:

I was getting calls from labels and managers and artists asking if I would write some songs for them, and everyone was asking for something leaning pop-punk. We haven't really done any pop-punk in a long time, so I thought "I don't even know if I can write anything like that, it's been like 16 years, maybe I'll try to write some songs". I wrote about seven or eight, and once I listened to them, I realized that I actually liked them, and I didn't want to give them away.

"I Don't Need Anyone" was the only song written and recorded after the band had decided on breaking up.

== Critical reception ==
Professional ratings
Aggregate scores
Source	Rating
AnyDecentMusic?	7.9/10
Metacritic	85/100
Review scores
Source	Rating
AllMusic	4.5/5 stars
The Arts Desk	4/5 stars
Blabbermouth.net	9/10
Classic Rock	3.5/5 stars
Dork	4/5
Exclaim!	6/10
The i Paper	4/5 stars
Kerrang!	4/5
NME	3/5 stars
Sputnikmusic	4.4/5

Heaven :x: Hell received acclaim from critics. At Metacritic, which assigns a normalized rating out of 100 to reviews from mainstream critics, the album has an average score of 85 out of 100 based on 5 reviews, indicating "universal acclaim". Neil Z. Yeung of AllMusic wrote that the Heaven side of the album "[finds] the sweet spot among Billy Talent, Green Day, and Blink-182," while the Hell side is similar to 2016's 13 Voices and 2019's Order in Decline as it is an "emotionally charged whirlpool of rage and frustration." Anne Erickson of Blabbermouth.net called the album "the most complete and adventurous album of [the band's] career." Charlotte Griffiths of Distorted Sound Magazine called the album a "perfect goodbye from such an iconic band." Kelsey McClure writing for Dork felt that despite its runtime, Heaven :x: Hell never drags, instead firing through hit after hit; time flies when you're having fun, and Sum 41's discography is a testament to that. It's a grand culmination of their work so far." Mischa Pearlman of Kerrang! called it "the album of their career" and felt it was a good way to wrap up their career.

Rishi Shah writing for NME described the album as a "pot of soundscapes cherry-picked from their career," and a "fitting last hurrah for a band" but had some criticisms for songs like "I Don't Need Anyone" and "House of Liars". Rowan Bruce of Noizze was more mixed on the album stating that, "[the album contains] the best singles of the band's career as well as a handful of unnecessary and repetitive tracks." Mercedes Chircop of Spill Magazine called the album "impeccably crafted" and said that "despite [the] distinct sounds [of Heaven and Hell], both sides remain unmistakably Sum 41." According to Sputnikmusic, the album is "emblematic of who they are, showcases their greatest strengths, and represents their most popular eras as a band." According to Paul Brown of Wall of sound, "[the album is] packed full of punchy, high-octane punk jams and tear-inducing, shred-filled metal anthems that'll withstand the test of time and remind us of the calibre of talent this band produced in their 28-year long journey."

== Track listing ==
Disc one – Heaven track listing
No.	Title	Writer(s)	Length
1.	"Waiting on a Twist of Fate"	Deryck Whibley; Mike Green	2:46
2.	"Landmines"	Whibley; Green	2:55
3.	"I Can't Wait"	Whibley	2:05
4.	"Time Won't Wait"	Whibley	2:30
5.	"Future Primitive"	Whibley	2:12
6.	"Dopamine"	Whibley; Nick Bailey; Sam Preston; Sam Tinnesz	3:06
7.	"Not Quite Myself"	Whibley	2:54
8.	"Bad Mistake"	Whibley	3:03
9.	"Johnny Libertine"	Whibley	1:35
10.	"Radio Silence"	Whibley	3:23
Total length:			26:29

Disc two – Hell track listing
No.	Title	Writer(s)	Length
11.	"Preparasi a Salire"	Whibley; Green	1:08
12.	"Rise Up"	Whibley; Green	3:16
13.	"Stranger in These Times"	Whibley; Green	2:57
14.	"I Don't Need Anyone"	Whibley; Green	3:10
15.	"Over the Edge"	Whibley; Green	3:09
16.	"House of Liars"	Whibley; Dave Baksh; Tom Thacker	3:06
17.	"You Wanted War"	Whibley	3:31
18.	"Paint It Black" (The Rolling Stones cover)	Jagger–Richards	2:42
19.	"It's All Me"	Whibley	2:18
20.	"How the End Begins"	Whibley; Green	3:16
Total length:			28:33 (55:02)

== Personnel ==
Sum 41

- Deryck Whibley – vocals, guitars, keyboards, piano, production, engineering, mixing, recording, art direction
- Dave "Brownsound" Baksh – guitars
- Tom Thacker – guitars
- Jason "Cone" McCaslin – bass
- Frank Zummo – drums

Production

- Mike Green – production (tracks 1–8, 10–15, 17–20)
- Ted Jensen – mastering (tracks 1, 3–5, 7–20)
- Kris Crummett – mastering (tracks 2, 6)
- Nick Bailey – additional engineering (track 6)

Additional musicians

- Mike Green – guitars, keyboards
- Nick Bailey – guitars (track 6)
- Gary Anderson – gang vocals (tracks 1–3, 6, 8, 12)
- David Jess – gang vocals (tracks 1–3, 6, 8, 12)
- Luke N. Bovill – gang vocals (tracks 1–3, 6, 8, 12)
- Rory Gault-Gordon – gang vocals (tracks 1–3, 6, 8, 12)
- Peter Bunting – gang vocals (tracks 1–3, 6, 8, 12)

Artwork

- Kevin Moore – layout, design
- Chris Rubey – layout, design

== Charts ==
Chart performance for Heaven :x: Hell
Chart (2024)	Peak position
Australian Albums (ARIA)	72
Austrian Albums (Ö3 Austria)	3
Belgian Albums (Ultratop Flanders)	11
Belgian Albums (Ultratop Wallonia)	13
Canadian Albums (Billboard)	37
French Albums (SNEP)	8
German Albums (Offizielle Top 100)	4
Hungarian Physical Albums (MAHASZ)	34
Irish Independent Albums (IRMA)	12
Italian Albums (FIMI)	48
Japanese Digital Albums (Oricon)	12
Japanese Hot Albums (Billboard Japan)	50
Japanese Rock Albums (Oricon)	15
Japanese Western Albums (Oricon)	18
Portuguese Albums (AFP)	72
Scottish Albums (Official Charts)	3
Spanish Albums (PROMUSICAE)	39
Swiss Albums (Schweizer Hitparade)	3
UK Albums (Official Charts)	26
UK Independent Albums (Official Charts)	2
UK Rock & Metal Albums (Official Charts)	1
US Billboard 200	108
US Independent Albums (Billboard)	20
US Top Album Sales (Billboard)	5
US Top Alternative Albums (Billboard)	11
US Top Rock Albums (Billboard)	19
