= Order in Decline =

Studio album by Sum 41
- Released: July 19, 2019
- Recorded: 2019
- Studio: Studio Mr. Biz (Whibley's home studio) (Los Angeles)
- Genres: Heavy metal; punk rock; melodic hardcore; alternative metal
- Length: 36:00
- Label: Hopeless
- Producer: Deryck Whibley

Sum 41 chronology
13 Voices (2016)	Order in Decline (2019)	Heaven :x: Hell (2024)

Singles from Order in Decline
- 1. "Out for Blood" Released: April 24, 2019; 2. "A Death in the Family" Released: June 11, 2019; 3. "Never There" Released: June 18, 2019; 4. "45 (A Matter of Time)" Released: July 8, 2019

Order in Decline is the seventh studio album by Canadian rock band Sum 41, released on July 19, 2019. It is their final release with Hopeless Records as they departed the label and signed with Rise Records in 2023. The band released the lead single "Out for Blood" on April 24, 2019. The second single from the album, "A Death in the Family" was released on June 11, 2019. The band released the third single "Never There" on June 18, 2019. The fourth single "45 (A Matter of Time)" was released on July 8, 2019.

== Background ==
On April 23, 2019, the band announced via social media that they were working on their seventh studio album. According to lead singer Deryck Whibley, the album will feature lyrics regarding social and political turmoil over the US and Canada. Whibley stated “The last thing I wanted to do was write a social or political protest record, and Order in Decline is not that. It's also very hard not to have feelings about everything that's going on in the world.” The band released a press statement calling the album their "heaviest and most aggressive" to date.

Whibley produced, engineered, and mixed the album himself. During the three years touring for 13 Voices (2016), the band came up with several song ideas. After finishing the tour; the music was finished within three weeks, with lyrics finished shortly afterwards.

== Singles ==
On April 24, 2019, they released the single "Out for Blood", written by Deryck Whibley and Mike Green through Hopeless Records, along with an accompanying music video. The same day, the band also announced their seventh studio album, Order in Decline, which was released on July 19, 2019. On June 11, the second single "A Death in the Family" was released along with a music video. On June 18, "Never There" was released as the third single, along with a video. On July 8, a fourth single, “45 (A Matter of Time),” was released, along with a music video. The acoustic versions of "Heads Will Roll" and "Catching Fire," which were released as bonus tracks, were released as a digital single under the title "Order in Decline B-Sides."

On May 28, 2021, almost two years after the album’s initial release, the band released a version of "Catching Fire" featuring Nothing,Nowhere, accompanied by a music video.

== Composition ==
Musically, Order in Decline has been described as continuing the band's departure from pop-punk, instead showing styles such as heavy metal, punk rock, melodic hardcore, and alternative metal.

== Critical reception ==
Professional ratings
Aggregate scores
Source	Rating
AnyDecentMusic?	6.2/10
Metacritic	75/100
Review scores
Source	Rating
AllMusic	4/5 stars
The Arts Desk	1/5 stars
Evening Standard	2/5 stars
Exclaim!	4/10
The Independent	3/5 stars
Kerrang!	4/5 stars
The Music	4.5/5 stars
Slant Magazine	4/5 stars
Sputnikmusic	3.8/5
The Times	2/5 stars

At Metacritic, which assigns a normalized rating out of 100 to reviews from mainstream critics, the album has an average score of 75 out of 100 based on 6 reviews, indicating "generally favorable reviews". AllMusic called the album "one of the most accomplished albums in their catalog." Wall of Sound gave the album a positive review, stating: "While it's doubtful we'll be seeing any pop/punk revival from these guys, Order in Decline is the best version of Sum 41 we've heard in years."

Kerrang! was positive toward the album, calling it "a darkly personal view of the world [and] their heaviest album to date." Slant Magazine was positive towards the album's production, calling it "pitch-perfect."

Distorted Sound Magazine was positive towards the album, stating: "Although ... some of the songs do not quite hit the mark, Order in Decline is a fine new effort from Sum 41 ... nostalgia can be a double-edged sword, but here, Sum 41 show no signs of relying on their successes of years gone by."

=== Accolades ===
Publication	Accolade	Year	Rank
Loudwire	Best Rock Albums of 2019 so far	2019	Not ranked

== Track listing ==
All tracks written by Deryck Whibley, except where noted.

No.	Title	Length
1.	"Turning Away"	3:50
2.	"Out for Blood" (Whibley, Mike Green)	3:36
3.	"The New Sensation"	3:50
4.	"A Death in the Family" (Whibley, Green)	3:18
5.	"Heads Will Roll"	3:50
6.	"45 (A Matter of Time)"	3:12
7.	"Never There"	4:20
8.	"Eat You Alive"	2:44
9.	"The People Vs..."	3:19
10.	"Catching Fire"	4:01
Total length:		36:00

Target and Japanese bonus tracks
No.	Title	Length
11.	"Heads Will Roll" (acoustic)	3:30
12.	"Catching Fire" (acoustic)	4:01
Total length:		43:30

== Personnel ==
Sum 41

- Deryck Whibley – vocals, guitars, keyboards, piano, production, engineering, mixing
- Dave "Brownsound" Baksh – guitars
- Tom Thacker – guitars
- Jason "Cone" McCaslin – bass
- Frank Zummo – drums

Additional musicians

- Mike Green – keyboards, guitar

Additional personnel

- Ted Jensen – mastering
- Doug McKean – drum engineering
- Chaz Sexton – engineering assistance

Artwork

- Brian Manley – artwork, layout
- Josh Budich – cover art
- Ashley Osborn – band photo
- Fredric Johansson – photography
- Kirsten Otto – photography
- Ryan Watanabe – photography
- Tyler Ross – photography

== Charts ==
Chart performance for Order in Decline
Chart (2019)	Peak position
Australian Albums (ARIA)	55
Austrian Albums (Ö3 Austria)	11
Belgian Albums (Ultratop Flanders)	21
Belgian Albums (Ultratop Wallonia)	38
Canadian Albums (Billboard)	13
Czech Albums (ČNS IFPI)	97
Dutch Albums (Album Top 100)	77
French Albums (SNEP)	29
German Albums (Offizielle Top 100)	9
Italian Albums (FIMI)	26
Japanese Albums (Oricon)	43
Scottish Albums (Official Charts)	17
Spanish Albums (PROMUSICAE)	36
Swiss Albums (Schweizer Hitparade)	7
UK Albums (Official Charts)	29
UK Rock & Metal Albums (OCC)	2
US Billboard 200	60
US Independent Albums (Billboard)	3
US Top Album Sales (Billboard)	8
US Top Alternative Albums (Billboard)	5
US Top Hard Rock Albums (Billboard)	2
US Top Rock Albums (Billboard)	8
