= Street Drum Corps =

American rock band

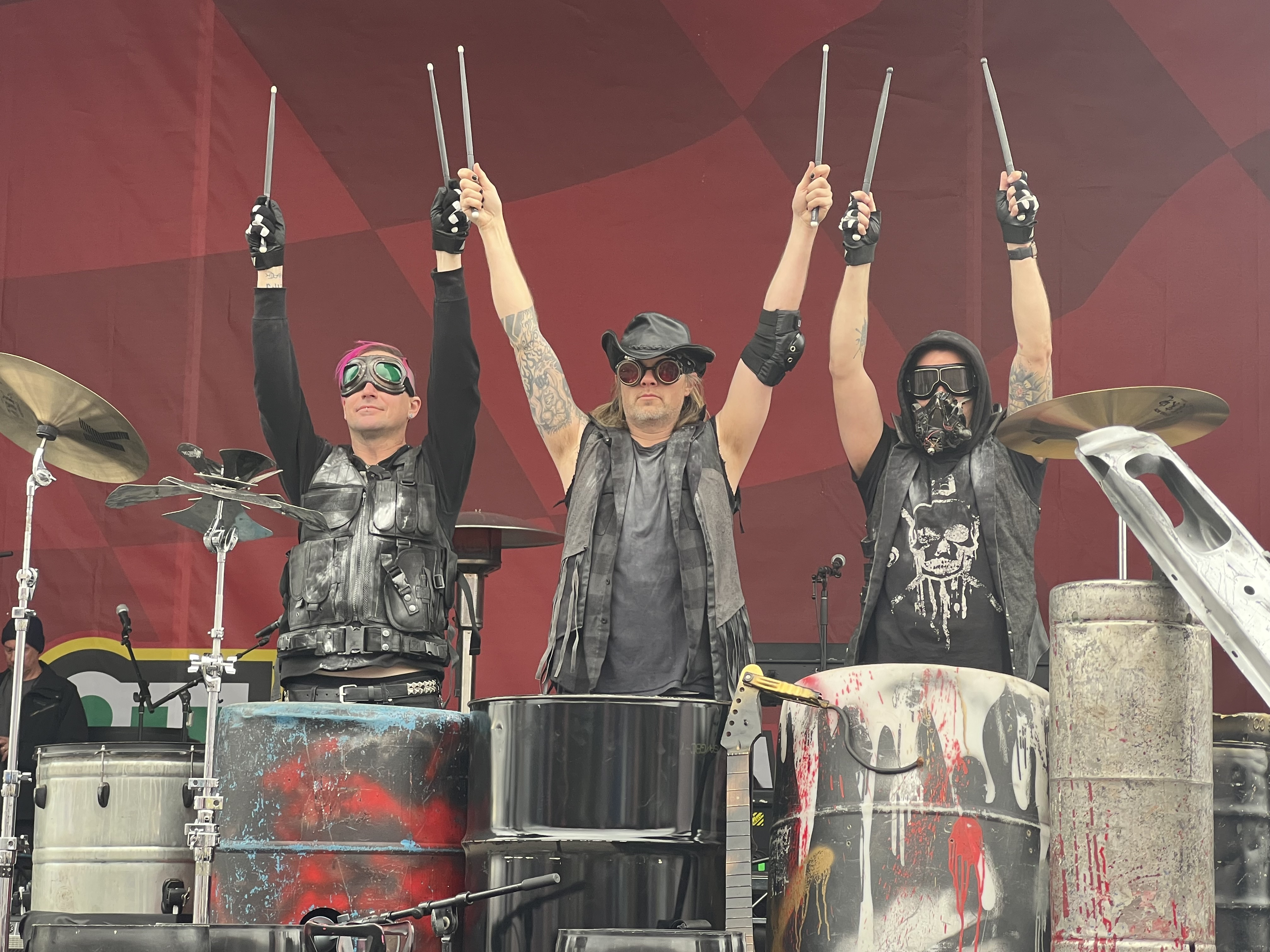
- Street Drum Corps performing at Auto Club Speedway in 2023

Background information
- Origin: Los Angeles, California, U.S.
- Genres: Alternative rock; experimental rock; punk revival; industrial
- Years active: 2004–present
- Labels: Warcon Enterprises, Interscope
- Members: Bobby Alt; Adam Alt; Frank Zummo
- Website: streetdrumcorps.com

Street Drum Corps is an American rock band formed in Los Angeles in 2004 by Bobby Alt of S.T.U.N. and Faculty X, Adam Alt of Circus Minor, and Frank Zummo of TheStart. The group performs exclusively on a variety of drums and percussion, including standard instruments such as drum kits, hand drums and marching band gear, along with unconventional objects not intended for music such as garbage cans, buckets, kitchenware, rain barrels, and power tools.

The group has released four albums and have been part of tours such as Vans Warped Tour, Taste of Chaos, Thirty Seconds to Mars's Into the Wild Tour and Linkin Park's Projekt Revolution. It has also performed with the likes of Stomp, No Doubt, Bad Religion, Good Charlotte, Atreyu, Strung Out, Alexisonfire and Deftones. Bert McCracken of The Used and Airin Older of Sugarcult have performed with Street Drum Corps several times, and shared the stage with them for the song "Flaco 81".

== History ==
=== Street Drum Corps (2004–2006) ===
Street Drum Corps was formed in Los Angeles by drummers Bobby and Adam Alt and Frank Zummo. Prior to forming, Bobby and Adam had a show called Experiment, where they played at schools and camps, where they played with drum kits, garbage cans and hand drums. Drummer Zummo, who had moved to L.A., also had a similar project in Pennsylvania called Repercussion and after catching one of the Experiment shows and drums into the tracks speaking to both Bobby and Adam, the three decided to get together eventually forming the group. The group's first release was a cover of "Happy Christmas (War Is Over)" featuring The Used frontman Bert McCracken released in 2005. Joining the Van's Warped Tour, the band was featured in a documentary, "Wake Up Screaming", about the Warped Tour experience. The group entered the studio to record their debut album, produced by Limp Bizkit's DJ Lethal, which featured guest musician John Sawicki of Stomp. The Band said that their primary influences for Street Drum Corps were Adam & The Ants, Oingo Boingo, Siouxsie and the Banshees, the Creatures, Jane's Addiction, and Mötley Crüe. In November, System of a Down guitarist Daron Malakian was said to be contributing a track to the group's album, however this did not happen, and the group were added to the lineup of the 2006 Taste of Chaos tour scheduled to kick off on February 15. The track "Flaco 81" was included on the "Best of the Taste of Chaos" album released in January 2006. Street Drum Corps was released on February 21, 2006, via Warcon Enterprises. They appeared on Late Night with Conan O'Brien in March 2006.

=== We Are Machines (2007–2008) ===
In 2007, the band were announced as part of the Van's Warped Tour touring through 2007 to 2008 where they were joined onstage by The Used during the shows. Street Drum Corps released their second album We Are Machines, produced by Street Drum Corps producer DJ Lethal, on April 1, 2008, through Lethal Dose Records which featured guest appearances by TheStart, Tor Kjeka, Adrian Young, David Adams, Sporty O and previous guest John Sawicki of Stomp. They were also announced as part of Linkin Park's Projekt Revolution tour, along with Chris Cornell, The Bravery and Ashes Divide, featuring on the Revolution Stage. They joined Linkin Park for performances of four songs: "One Step Closer", No More Sorrow, "Bleed it Out", and "What I've Done". In November the band opened up for Mötley Crüe at the Palladium in Los Angeles.

=== Big Noise and Children of the Drum (2009–2014) ===
After being signed by Interscope Records, the group began recording the follow-up to We Are Machines in the Summer of 2009. The group appeared on The Tonight Show with Conan O'Brien in December performing with Thirty Seconds to Mars.

In January 2010, the band were confirmed as the main support for Thirty Seconds to Mars on their Into The Wild Tour where they were previewing songs from their upcoming album such as "Marry Me", "Terror Surrounding", "Come Alive", "Play on It", "I Miss You", "Knock Me Out" and "Little Ones". On March 17, the group announced that they had been added to the lineup of The Bamboozle festival taking place on March 27. In May, it was announced that the group would be making an appearance on American Idol on May 19, performing with Travis Garland, who would be singing his new single, "Believe".

== Discography ==
=== Albums ===
==== Studio albums ====
List of studio albums
Title	Album details
Street Drum Corps	Released: February 21, 2006 (US); Label: Warcon Enterprises; Formats: CD+DVD, digital download
We Are Machines	Released: April 1, 2008; Label: Lethal Dose; Formats: CD, digital download
Big Noise	Released: November 16, 2010; Label: DGC, Interscope; Formats: CD, digital download
Children of the Drum	Released: November 6, 2012 (US); Label: Self-released; Formats: Digital download

==== Compilation albums ====
List of compilation albums
Title	Album details
10 Year Anniversary	Released: July 16, 2014 (US); Label: Self-released; Formats: CD

==== Soundtracks ====
List of soundtracks
Title	Album details
Blood Drums	Released: September 14, 2012; Label: Self-released; Formats: CD

=== Singles ===
List of singles, showing year released and album name
Single	Year	Album
"Happy Christmas (War Is Over)" (featuring Bert McCracken)	2005	Taste of Christmas
"Action!"	2007	We Are Machines
"Knock Me Out"	2010	—N/a
"God, Oil, Rock & Roll"	2011	Children of the Drum
"Images of Justice" (Street Drum Corps with Roy Mayorga)	2014	10 Year Anniversary

=== Other appearances ===
Title	Year	Album
"Flaco 81"	2006	The Best of Taste of Chaos
"Circuitry" (Electric Valentine featuring Street Drum Corps)	2013	Circuitry

==== Video albums ====
List of video albums
Title	Album details
Big Noise Live @ The Roxy	Released: January 2, 2012; Label: Self-released; Formats: Digital download

==== Music videos ====
List of music videos, showing year released and director
Title	Year	Director(s)
"Happy Christmas (War Is Over)" (featuring Bert McCracken)	2005	Bert McCracken and David Brodsky
"Flaco 81"	2006	
"Wrecks"	2006	Artificial Army
"S.D.C.X"	2013	JB Jacobs

=== Unreleased songs ===
List of unreleased songs
Title	Year	Notes
"Rise Above"	2008	Was available on MySpace for a short time and was performed live on the "Rockstar Energy Get a Life Tour" & "Projekt Revolution Tour".
"Before I Die"	2011	Was written and recorded with Chris Doss in Burbank, California. Originally to be released as a single for their fourth studio album. The song was also co-written by Bobby's wife Caroline D'Amore and long time friend Andrew Beall. Chris Doss is also featured as background vocalist on the track.
"Caught in the Swing"	2011	Written and produced by Bobby Alt and Chris Doss in Burbank, California.

== Members ==
=== Band members ===
- Bobby Alt – vocals, drums
- Adam Alt – drums
- Frank Zummo – drums

=== Live members ===
- Justin Imamura AKA The Bambino, Gas Mask Man Percussion
- Scott Zant guitar
- Tyler William Johnson
- J. Tyler Trammel percussion

== See also ==
- List of Warped Tour lineups by year
- The Bamboozle Festival lineup 2010
