= God Save Us All (Death to Pop) =

"God Save Us All (Death to POP)"

Promotional single by Sum 41

from the album 13 Voices
- Released: September 29, 2016
- Recorded: June 2014–April 2016
- Length: 3:53
- Label: Hopeless
- Songwriter(s): Deryck Whibley
- Producer(s): Deryck Whibley

"God Save Us All (Death to POP)" is the eighth track on Canadian rock band Sum 41's album 13 Voices, and was released on September 29, 2016.

== Music video ==
The release of the single was accompanied by a live music video, directed by Blake Primes, with footage filmed on the band's 2016 European summer tour and the 2016 Vans Warped Tour, beginning with lead singer and rhythm guitarist Deryck Whibley stating that:

The cool thing about playing rock music all over the world is that you get to share this unity through music with other people, and, in my opinion, I think you only get that feeling with rock music, I don't think you feel anything with pop.
