= Landmines (song) =

2023 single by Sum 41

Single by Sum 41

from the album Heaven :x: Hell
- Released: September 27, 2023
- Genre: Pop-punk
- Length: 2:55
- Label: Rise
- Songwriter: Deryck Whibley
- Producers: Deryck Whibley; Mike Green

Sum 41 singles chronology
"45 (A Matter of Time)" (2019)	"Landmines" (2023)	"Rise Up" (2023)

Music video
- "Landmines" on YouTube

"Landmines" is a song by Canadian rock band Sum 41, released on September 27, 2023, as the lead single from the band's eighth and final studio album Heaven :x: Hell (2024). A pop-punk song reminiscent of the band's early career, Whibley wrote the song after being approached to write songs for other artists; "Landmines" was one of the first written in this process, which Whibley decided to keep for Sum 41. The track received acclaim from music critics, who praised its catchiness despite some criticism towards its formulaic sound. "Landmines" peaked on the Canada Rock chart and the US Alternative Airplay chart, breaking the record for the longest gap between two songs by the same artist on the latter.

== Background and release ==
On March 23, 2022, Sum 41 announced their eighth studio album, Heaven :x: Hell. A double album, where the "heaven" side leans into a pop-punk sound while the "hell" side instead features a heavier metal sound, the album was accidentally conceived when frontman Deryck Whibley began writing songs in the pop-punk style of Sum 41's debut studio album All Killer, No Filler during the COVID-19 pandemic. According to Whibley, "Landmines" was specifically conceived after he sold the band's catalog, citing the "pressure and the need to create something". He wrote the track after being approached to write pop-punk songs for other artists, yet decided to hold onto "Landmines" because he "didn't want to give them away, but [...] also didn't think Sum 41 were ready to put them out just yet". Bassist Jason McCaslin recalled the song being the first he received from Whibley from Heaven :x: Hell, saying that it convinced him that a pop-punk sound was viable.

"Landmines" was first released for digital download and streaming on September 27, 2023 as the lead single from Heaven :x: Hell; an accompanying music video for the song was released the same day. The song was the first to be released by the band after they signed to Rise Records. The band later released a stripped-back version of the song on March 28, 2025, for the Spotify Singles series. On February 8, 2024, Sum 41 performed "Landmines" on Jimmy Kimmel Live!, surrounded by visuals of flames and tombstones. The song was also included in the set list of the Tour of the Setting Sum, the band's farewell tour, and was performed during the band's final performance of their career at the Juno Awards of 2025.

== Composition and lyrics ==
"Landmines" is a pop-punk song which Andrew Sacher of Alternative Press described as being "straight out of the band’s classic early 2000s pop-punk era, with a few modern twists". The song begins with broken chords, before palm muted guitar enters; in the song's half-time chorus, chanted vocals reminiscent of the band's early career sing over a "stop-and-start dynamic". Kerry Doole of Billboard Canada characterized Whibley's vocals as being "rapid-fire and hoarsely intense", and noted that the song had "lusty" backing vocals. Whibley described the song as being one of the slowest on Heaven :x: Hell, but noted how the album was already "fast and aggressive" as a whole. Lyrically, "Landmines" concerns "hanging on" amid life's struggles.

== Reception ==
"Landmines" received generally positive reviews from music critics, with Rishi Shah of NME calling it Sum 41's "finest work since the 2000s". Both James Wilson-Taylor of Rock Sound and a review for Sputnikmusic praised the song's catchiness, while Mischa Pearlman of Kerrang! praised the song for being "impassioned" despite the contrast between its upbeat melody and the angst which inspired the song. Chuck Armstrong of Loudwire commented that "Landmines", along with "Waiting on a Twist of Fate" and "I Can't Wait", would "carry [the band's] legacy into many generations to come". However, Paul Dika of Exclaim! criticized the song's formulaic sound, while Doole noted that the song was not "wildly original" despite its "effective" songwriting and "strong" chorus.

Commercially, "Landmines" became the second song by the band to top the US Alternative Airplay chart since "Fat Lip" in August 2001, marking the longest gap between two No. 1 songs on the chart at 22 years, 5 months, and 3 weeks. Additionally, the song reached No. 2 on the US Rock & Alternative Airplay chart and No. 41 on the Hot Rock & Alternative Songs chart. "Landmines" topped Billboard's year-end chart for Alternative Airplay, and reached No. 2 on the year-end chart for Rock Airplay. In Canada, "Landmines" topped the Canada Rock chart and reached No. 47 on the Canadian Digital Songs Sales chart. The song also reached No. 30 on the New Zealand Hot Singles chart and No. 48 on the France Top Radio chart.

== Credits and personnel ==
Credits are adapted from iTunes.

Sum 41
- Deryck Whibley – lead vocals, songwriter, producer, mixing, engineering
- Dave Baksh – guitar, backing vocals
- Tom Thacker – guitar, backing vocals
- Jason McCaslin – bass
- Frank Zummo – drums
Additional musicians
- Gary Anderson – backing vocals
- Luke Bovill – backing vocals
- Peter Bunting – backing vocals
- Rory Gault-Gordon – backing vocals
- David Jess – backing vocals

Production

- Mike Green – producer
- Kris Crummett – mastering

== Charts ==
=== Weekly charts ===
Weekly chart performance for "Landmines"
Chart (2023–24)	Peak position
Canada Digital Songs (Billboard)	47
Canada Rock (Billboard)	1
France Airplay (SNEP)	48
New Zealand Hot Singles (RMNZ)	30
US Hot Rock & Alternative Songs (Billboard)	41
US Rock & Alternative Airplay (Billboard)	2

=== Year-end charts ===
Year-end chart performance for "Landmines"
Chart (2024)	Position
US Rock & Alternative Airplay (Billboard)	2

Chart (2025)	Position
Canada Mainstream Rock (Billboard)	14

== Certifications ==
Certifications for "Landmines"
Region	Certification	Certified units/sales
Canada (Music Canada)	Gold	40,000^{‡}
^{‡} Sales+streaming figures based on certification alone.

== Release history ==
Release history for "Landmines"
Region	Date	Format(s)	Label	Ref.
Various	September 27, 2023	Digital download; streaming	Rise	
United States	October 3, 2023	Modern rock radio	Rise	
