= Fake My Own Death =

Single by Sum 41

from the album 13 Voices
- Released: June 28, 2016
- Recorded: 2014
- Studio: Studio Mr. Biz (Whibley's home studio) (Los Angeles)
- Genre: Punk metal
- Length: 3:14
- Label: Hopeless
- Songwriters: Deryck Whibley; Tom Thacker; Jason "Cone" McCaslin
- Producer: Deryck Whibley

Sum 41 singles chronology
"Baby You Don't Wanna Know" (2011)	"Fake My Own Death" (2016)	"War" (2016)

"Fake My Own Death" is the lead single from Sum 41's sixth studio album 13 Voices, which was released on October 7, 2016. The song was the third track on the album. The song was released on June 28, 2016, along with an accompanying music video, through Hopeless Records' official YouTube channel.

It is the first single from the band to feature new drummer Frank Zummo, who replaced previous drummer Steve Jocz who left in 2013. It is also their first single since the return of guitarist Dave Baksh in 2015.

== Music video ==
The song's music video was released through the Hopeless Records official YouTube channel, on June 28, 2016. It was directed by longtime collaborator Marc Klasfeld, who also directed the band's music videos for "Fat Lip", "In Too Deep", "We're All to Blame" and more.

The video begins at 7th and Broadway in Downtown Los Angeles, one block over from the site of Avril Lavigne's infamous street concert in 2002 video "Sk8er Boi". Then it cuts to the band playing on a rooftop intercut with shots of the band escaping from popular internet memes, as well as internet public figures, that are attacking them, and then ultimately fighting them. Among the memes and public figures in the videos are the Nyan Cat, Kim Kardashian posing nude (from her 'Break the Internet' photo shoot for Paper magazine), Miley Cyrus on a "Wrecking Ball", Sylvester Stallone as John Rambo, Angry Birds, Doge, Bill Cosby, Brad Pitt, Charlie Sheen, Sean Bean, Ben Affleck, Donald Trump, Bernie Sanders, James Franco, Seth Rogen, Michael Jordan, Shia LaBeouf from his motivational video, a few Guitar Hero references (like Deryck Whibley playing a Guitar Hero game controller instead of his actual guitar for a few seconds), Trevor Philips from Grand Theft Auto V, Kermit the Frog, SpongeBob, Spider-Man and more. It is the first video by the band to feature the return of guitarist Dave Baksh and the first video not to feature former drummer Steve Jocz, who was replaced by Frank Zummo.

== Live performances ==
The song "Fake My Own Death" was performed on The Late Show with Stephen Colbert on October 3, 2016.

== Charts ==
Chart performance for "Fake My Own Death"
Chart (2016)	Peak position
Canada Rock (Billboard)	45
US Rock Digital Song Sales (Billboard)	44
