= War (Sum 41 song) =

Single by Sum 41

from the album 13 Voices
- Released: August 25, 2016
- Recorded: 2015
- Studio: Studio Mr. Biz (Whibley's home studio) (Los Angeles)
- Genre: Alternative rock
- Length: 3:29
- Label: Hopeless
- Songwriter: Deryck Whibley
- Producer: Deryck Whibley

Sum 41 singles chronology
"Fake My Own Death" (2016)	"War" (2016)	"Out for Blood" (2019)

"War" is a song by Canadian rock band Sum 41. It was released as the second single from the album 13 Voices on August 25, 2016.

== Background ==
The song was released as a single, along with accompanying music video, on August 25, 2016, through the official channel of YouTube, Hopeless Records.

== Music video ==
The song's music video was released through the Hopeless Records official YouTube channel, on August 24, 2016. It was directed by Djay Brawner.

== Charts ==
Chart performance for "War"
Chart (2016)	Peak position
Canada Rock (Billboard)	23

== Release history ==
Country	Date	Format	Label	Ref.
Worldwide	August 24, 2016	Digital download	Hopeless	
United Kingdom	September 30, 2016	Digital download	Hopeless; Sony RED UK	
