= With Me (Sum 41 song) =

2008 single by Sum 41

Single by Sum 41

from the album Underclass Hero
- Released: January 26, 2008
- Recorded: November 6, 2006–March 2007
- Genre: Emo
- Length: 4:51
- Label: Island
- Songwriter: Deryck Whibley
- Producer: Deryck Whibley

Sum 41 singles chronology
"Walking Disaster" (2007)	"With Me" (2008)	"Screaming Bloody Murder" (2011)

Music video
- "With Me" on YouTube

"With Me" is the third single from Sum 41's 2007 studio album Underclass Hero. A ballad, the first live performance of "With Me" was on January 26, 2008 at the Daytona International Speedway in Daytona Beach, Florida. On February 4, Sum 41 announced that they had filmed the video for "With Me", and the song was later featured on Season 1, Episode 7 of Gossip Girl. The song was featured on the commercial for the 2009 Fox series More to Love. The song charted at 37 in the Canadian Singles Chart. With a running time of 4 minutes and 51 seconds, "With Me" was the band's longest song for nine years until it was surpassed by the 5-minute "Twisted by Design" from 2016's 13 Voices.

== Music video ==
The music video was released on the band's MySpace page on February 28. The band announced that the video was shot near Toronto, Ontario. It starts off with Deryck Whibley playing an acoustic guitar as shots show around the house he is playing in. There are many shots of pictures and people (including one of the Shriners). Each of these people has different uses for pictures and photos (e.g. the old man uses his pictures to remember his old days in the army and the young couple use them to take photos of themselves together). There is then shots of Whibley, Jason McCaslin, and Steve Jocz playing in a room where they play the chorus of the song; they then use this room to play the rest of the song in. We then learn more about the people and why their pictures are so important to them. More is revealed about them as the second verse goes on. Then, just before the second chorus, a framed picture with a moving image of Whibley walking is shown. As Whibley walks, the environment behind him changes rapidly showing many different places. After this, the song goes back to being acoustic for 8 bars. During this, Whibley is shown playing his acoustic guitar again. Also, the people in the house begin to freeze frame and turn into framed pictures of themselves. The song then continues and ends. The video shows the many aspects of the song.

== Live performances ==
The first live performance of "With Me" was on January 26, 2008 at the Daytona International Speedway in Daytona Beach, Florida for Jimmy Kimmel Live!.

== First Dance Version ==
"With Me (First Dance Version)"

Single by Sum 41 and Deryck Whibley

from the album Diamonds of the Night: Vol. 1
- Released: November 18, 2026
- Genre: Acoustic rock
- Songwriter: Deryck Whibley

In November 2026, Sum 41 and Deryck Whibley announced a re-recorded version of the song titled "With Me (First Dance Version)", scheduled for release on November 18, 2026. The recording appears on the acoustic re-recording album Diamonds of the Night: Vol. 1, credited to Sum 41 and Whibley and scheduled for release in March 2027.

== Charts ==
Chart (2007–08)	Peak position
Canada Hot 100 (Billboard)	37
Canada CHR/Top 40 (Billboard)	21
Canada Hot AC (Billboard)	22
Canada Rock (Billboard)	35

== Certifications ==
Region	Certification	Certified units/sales
Italy (FIMI)	Gold	50,000^{‡}
United States (RIAA)	Gold	500,000^{‡}
^{‡} Sales+streaming figures based on certification alone.

== Release history ==
Release dates and formats for "With Me"
Region	Date	Format	Label(s)	Ref.
United States	April 1, 2008	Mainstream airplay	Island	
