= Walking Disaster =

Single by Sum 41

from the album Underclass Hero
- Released: July 24, 2007
- Recorded: November 6, 2006–March 14, 2007
- Genre: Pop punk
- Length: 4:46; 4:16 (radio edit)
- Label: Island
- Songwriter(s): Deryck Whibley
- Producer(s): Deryck Whibley

Sum 41 singles chronology
"Underclass Hero" (2007)	"Walking Disaster" (2007)	"With Me" (2008)

Audio sample
- "Walking Disaster": file; help

"Walking Disaster" is the second track on Sum 41's 2007 studio album Underclass Hero. It was released as the album's second single on July 24, 2007, six days after the release of the album. The band performed the song on The Tonight Show with Jay Leno on July 24, 2007.

== Music video ==
Sum 41 recorded the music video for "Walking Disaster" while in Los Angeles during the time of their stay when they performed on Jay Leno. The video premiered on August 20 on MTV2. The video focuses on a toy robot walking around L.A. Meanwhile, the band is playing in a toy store in Los Angeles. In the end the robot finds his way back home to the toy store which has been trashed by Sum 41.

== Track listing ==
CD single
No.	Title	Length
1.	"Walking Disaster"	4:46
2.	"No Apologies"	2:58
3.	"Underclass Hero"	3:15
4.	"Multimedia"

CD single (later pressings)
No.	Title	Length
1.	"Walking Disaster" (radio edit)	4:16
2.	"Walking Disaster"	4:46
3.	"Count Your Last Blessings" (live)

Radio promo
No.	Title	Length
1.	"Walking Disaster" (radio edit)	4:16

== Charts ==
Chart (2007)	Peak position
Canada Rock (Billboard)	24
US Alternative Airplay (Billboard)	26
