= Frank Zummo =

American drummer (born 1978)

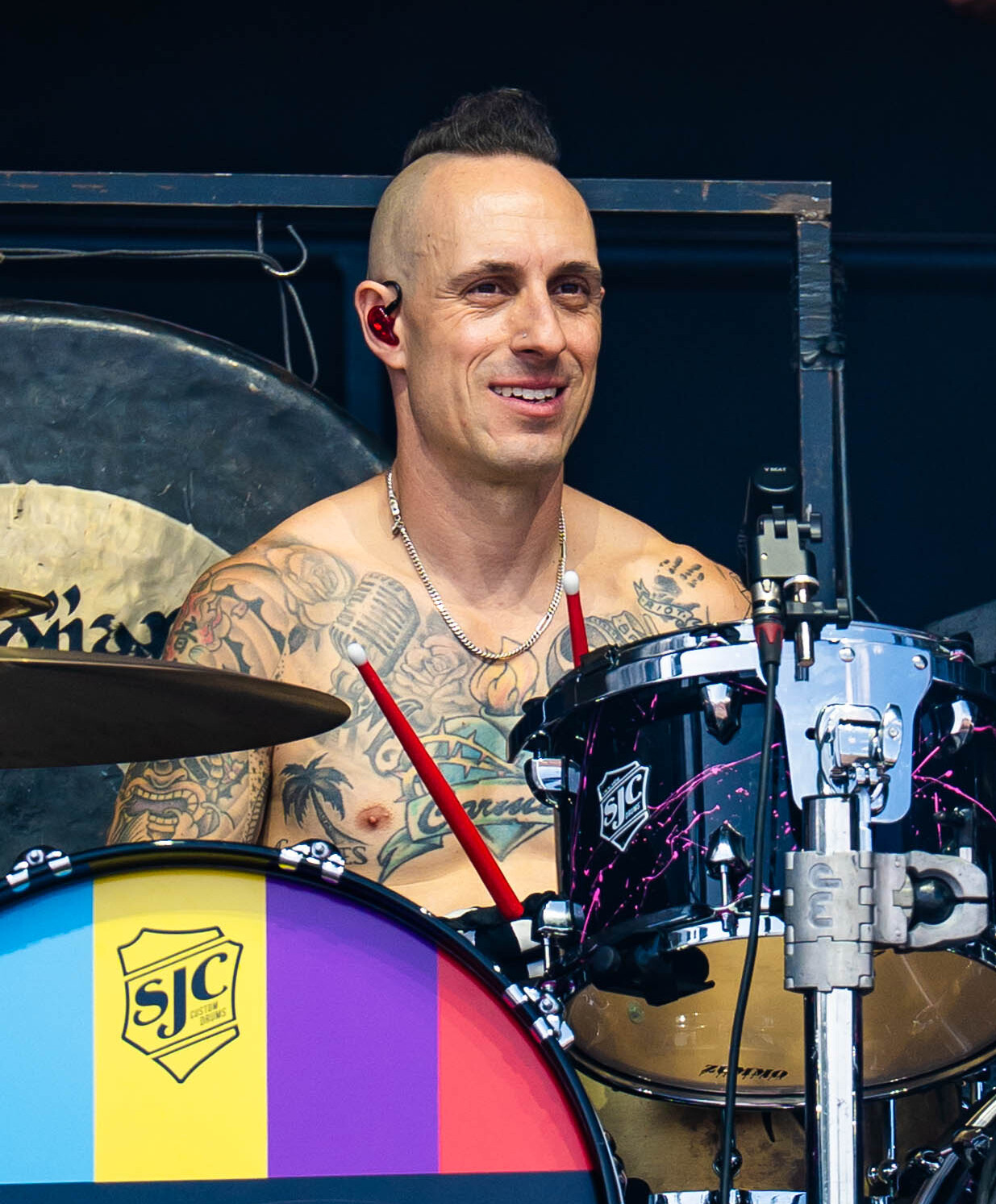
- Zummo performing at Tons of Rock 2025

Background information
- Born: 2 July 1978 (age 48); Long Island, New York, U.S.
- Genres: Alternative rock; punk rock; hard rock; alternative metal; electronicore
- Occupation: Musician
- Instrument: Drums
- Years active: 2001–present
- Member of: Electric Callboy; Street Drum Corps; Gravas
- Formerly of: Sum 41; Dead by Sunrise; Thenewno2

Frank C. Zummo (born July 2, 1978) is an American drummer, best known as a member of the rock bands Sum 41, Street Drum Corps, Gravas, and Electric Callboy.

== Career ==
Zummo is one of the founding members of Street Drum Corps. He has performed as the drummer for several other bands, both as a full-time member and session member, including Thenewno2, theStart, Dead By Sunrise, Virgin Steele, and Krewella. In August 2009, Zummo filled in for Tommy Lee for a string of Mötley Crüe shows. In January 2011, he became the new drummer for the band Julien-K.

Zummo joined Sum 41 in 2015, following the departure of original drummer and founding member Steve Jocz in 2013. Zummo has recorded three studio albums with Sum 41, 2016's 13 Voices, 2019's Order in Decline, and 2024's Heaven :x: Hell.

He has performed duos between drum sets and DJ several times at Emo Nite in Los Angeles.

Zummo filled in as the drummer for Electric Callboy at the Good Things Festival 2024 after their drummer David Friedrich fell sick, and was described as a "lifesaver" for helping the band perform on such short notice. Sum 41 disbanded in 2025, and Zummo has credited the opportunity with re-energizing his interest in music after the split. After Friedrich left Electric Callboy, Zummo became their official drummer for a string of 2025 performances.

== Discography ==
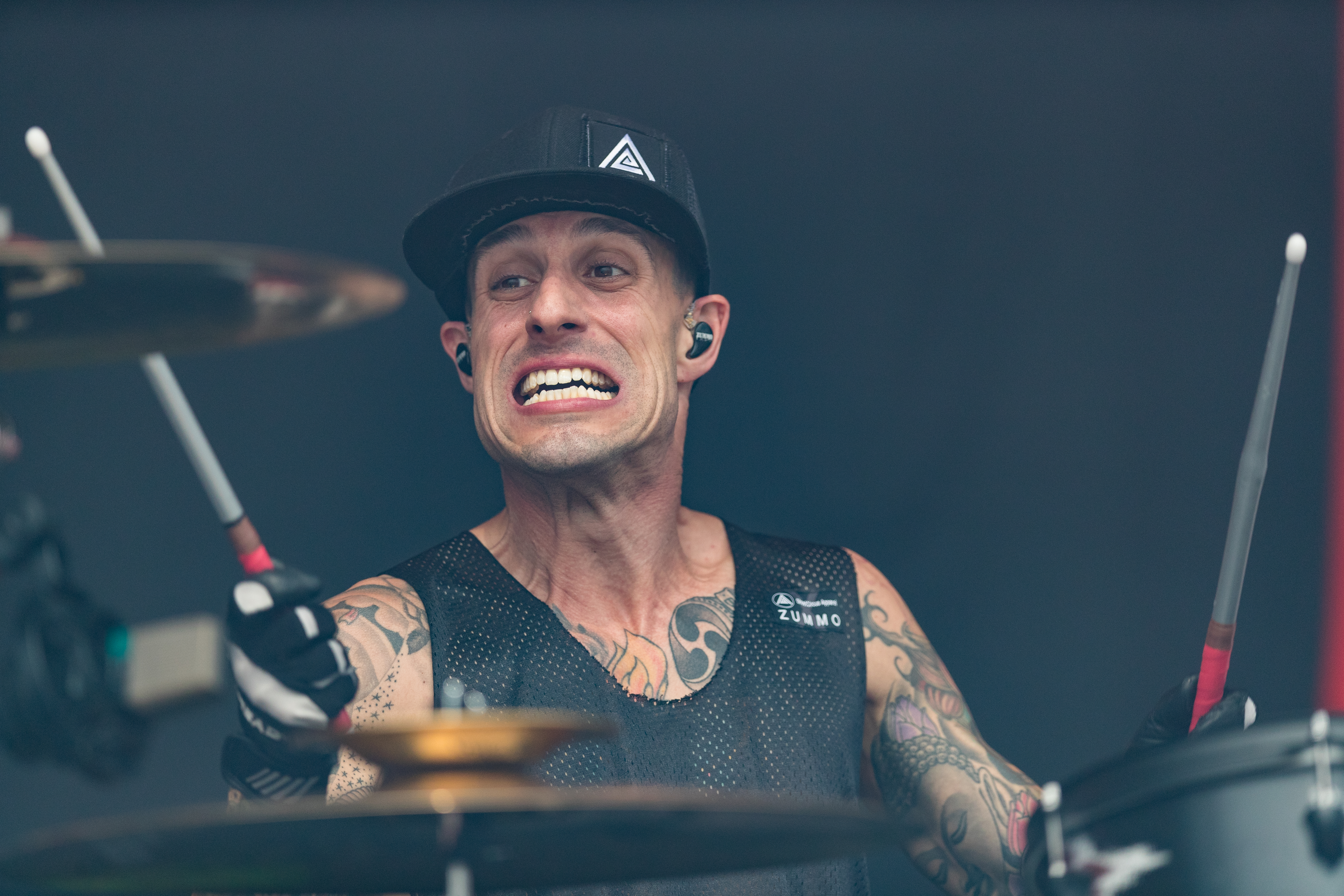
Zummo with Sum 41 at Rock am Ring 2017

With Street Drum Corps

- Street Drum Corps (2006)
- We Are Machines (2008)
- Big Noise (2010)
- Children of the Drum (2012)

With Sum 41

- 13 Voices (2016)
- Order in Decline (2019)
- Heaven :x: Hell (2024)

With Gravas

- Call Out To The Moon [EP] (2025)
- "Drown"
- "Erase Me"

As a featured artist

- Titus – "Wasted Youth"
- Virtual Riot & Modestep – "This Could Be Us"
- Ray Volpe – "Afterlife (I'll Dream of You)"
- Kayzo & Shybeast – "Cruel Love"
- Electric Callboy – “Still Waiting” (Cover)
- Green Day (on Drumeo) – "Jesus of Suburbia" (Drum Cover)

== Awards and nominations ==
=== Awards ===
A select list of Zummo's awards and nominations.

Year	Nominee / work	Award	Result
2017	"Frank Zummo"	Alternative Press Music Awards – Best Drummer	Won
2025	"Frank Zummo"	Nik Nocturnal Awards – Drummer of the Year	Won
