= The Arena (song) =

Single by Lindsey Stirling

from the album Brave Enough
- Released: 28 June 2016
- Genre: Dubstep; classical crossover; electro house; EDM
- Length: 3:53
- Label: Lindseystomp Records
- Songwriters: Lindsey Stirling, Taylor Bird, Peter Hanna
- Producer: RUMORS

Lindsey Stirling singles chronology
"Hallelujah" (2015)	"The Arena" (2016)	"Something Wild" (2016)

"The Arena" is a 2016 single released by violinist Lindsey Stirling.

== Background ==
"The Arena" is the third track and first single from the album Brave Enough. The instrumental track was written by Stirling, Hanna and Bird and produced by RUMORS. In the booklet released with Brave Enough, is a quote from Theodore Roosevelt said to have inspired the song:

"It is not the critic who counts; not the man who points out how the strong man stumbles; or where the doer of deeds could have done them better. The credit belongs to the man who is actually in the arena"

"The Arena" features regularly on Stirling's live concert performances, from Brave Enough Tour through to her more recent Artemis Tour.

== Music video ==
The music video for "The Arena" was released on June 28, 2016. It features Stirling and professional dancer Derek Hough. In a post-apocalyptic, Mad Max inspired environment, Stirling and Hough enter an arena surrounded by crowds and perform an elaborate dance.

In an interview, Stirling said that the performance was said to be a display of how to combat criticism, especially our own.

As of March 2022, the video has over 85 million views on YouTube.
