= Something Wild (song) =

Single by Lindsey Stirling featuring Andrew McMahon in the Wilderness

from the album Pete's Dragon and Brave Enough
- Released: 15 July 2016
- Genre: Pop; classical crossover; EDM
- Length: 3:13
- Label: BMG
- Songwriters: Lindsey Stirling; Peter Hanna; Taylor Bird; Andrew McMahon
- Producer: Jerad Anderson

Lindsey Stirling singles chronology
"The Arena" (2016)	"Something Wild" (2016)	"Prism" (2016)

"Something Wild" is a 2016 single by Lindsey Stirling featuring Andrew McMahon in the Wilderness .

== Composition ==
"Something Wild" was written for the Disney film, Pete's Dragon, a 2016 remake of the 1977 movie. The film was released on August 12 with the song played over the end credits.

In a video on Facebook live, Stirling confirmed Disney approached her to compose a song for the remake, and she wrote "Something Wild" the same day.

Stirling performed the song on her Brave Enough Tour that started later in 2016. She also appeared on episode 15 of the Billboard Chart Center to perform the song live.

== Album appearances ==
The song appears on Stirling's third studio album, Brave Enough, and also on the official Disney soundtrack for Pete's Dragon.

== Music video ==
On August 2, 2016, a music video to accompany the song was released. The video shows Stirling playing her violin in a sunny park and a night time desert scene, whereas McMahon is playing his piano in a small room. The music video also is interlaced with clips from the movie.

The video received 3 million views on YouTube in under a month.

== Charts ==
Something Wild peaked at number 1 on the Classical Digital Streaming Songs chart. It also reached 34 on the US Dance/Electronic Digital Song Sales chart.

Chart	Peak position
US Classical Digital Streaming Songs (Billboard)	1
US Dance/Electronic Digital Songs (Billboard)	34
