= Lindsey Stirling: Brave Enough =

- Official poster
- Directed by: Dan Cutforth; Jane Lipsitz
- Produced by: Rich Eckersley; Adina Friedman; Lindsey Stirling
- Starring: Lindsey Stirling
- Edited by: Christine Khalafian; Steve Lichtenstein; Jillian Moul
- Music by: Lindsey Stirling
- Production companies: Magical Elves Productions; YouTube Premium
- Distributed by: YouTube
- Release date: May 17, 2017
- Running time: 75 minutes
- Language: English

Lindsey Stirling: Brave Enough is a 2017 American autobiographical documentary concert film about violinist, songwriter and dancer Lindsey Stirling. The film was distributed exclusively via YouTube as paid premium content. The film was directed by Dan Cutforth and Jane Lipsitz who also directed the movies Katy Perry: Part of Me and Justin Bieber: Never Say Never.

== Summary ==
The film is based around a year in Stirling's life and starts on the eve of her 30th birthday. It documents her new album, Brave Enough, and world tour. With behind the scenes footage and an exclusive look at Stirling's life, we see her coming to terms with the loss of her friend and former band member Jason Gaviati, the failing health of her father and undertaking performances at venues such as the Dolby Theatre in Los Angeles. There is also footage of Stirling's early life. Stirling offers a candid look at some of her own challenges including her fear of not being good enough, her negative self image and overcoming anorexia.

== Cast ==
Main cast:

- Lindsey Stirling
- Jason Gaviati (archive footage)
- ZZ Ward
- Justine Ezarik
- Cassey Ho
- Rosanna Pansino

== Release ==
The film was released exclusively via YouTube, on a premium paid service. It is rated TV-PG.

== Critical reception ==
Barbara Shulgasser-Parker of Common Sense Media wrote in her review "This documentary does a good job of showcasing the talents and charm of the buoyant and earnest electronic dance music violinist/dancer as she tours with her show and copes with loss and grief."

Aviously rated the film 7.5/10 saying "Lindsey shares so much more with the viewers, as her journey and story are worth the watch. Watching it makes you feel the emotion that went into the album, something usually only the band members know about and understand."
