= Warmer in the Winter Christmas Tour =

2019 concert tour by Lindsey Stirling

Warmer In The Winter Christmas Tour
- Tour by Lindsey Stirling
- Warmer In The Winter Christmas Tour Promotional Poster
- Associated album: Warmer in the Winter
- Start date: November 19, 2019
- End date: December 23, 2019
- No. of shows: 26 in North America

Lindsey Stirling concert chronology
- Lindsey Stirling Artemis Tour (2019); Warmer in the Winter Tour (2019); The Lindsey Stirling Christmas Program Tour (2021)

The Warmer in the Winter Christmas Tour is a 2019 North American concert tour by American violinist Lindsey Stirling. This was her third Christmas tour, celebrating her album Warmer in the Winter.

== Background ==
In 2017, Stirling released the Christmas album Warmer in the Winter and toured that December. She repeated the Christmas theme in 2018 with her Wanderland Tour. Ahead of this tour, Stirling noted in an interview how her fans encouraged her to make this an annual event.

The 2019 Warmer in the Winter Christmas Tour was a 26-date concert tour across North America. It began in Fresno, California, on 19 November and concluded on December 23 in Fort Myers, Florida.

== Set list ==
The following set list is representative of the show in Fort Lauderdale, Florida, on December 21, 2019. It is not representative of all concerts for the duration of the tour.

1. "All I Want for Christmas Is You"
2. "Christmas C'Mon"
3. "Let It Snow! Let It Snow! Let It Snow!"
4. "Warmer in the Winter"
5. "Jingle Bell Rock"
6. "I Saw Three Ships/ God Rest 'Ye Merry Gentlemen"
7. "Jingle Bells / Deck the Halls / It's Beginning to Look Like Christmas / Grandma Got Run Over by a Reindeer / Hedwig's Theme / Feliz Navidad / The Devil Went Down to Georgia"
8. "Hallelujah"
9. "Angels We Have Heard on High"
10. "Crystallize"
11. "Between Twilight"
12. "Dance of the Sugar Plum Fairy"
13. "Santa Baby"
14. "Feeling Good"
15. "We Three Gentlemen"
16. "Carol of the Bells"
17. "You're a Mean One, Mr. Grinch"

Encore

18. "I Wonder as I Wander"

== Reception ==
Music Connection wrote positively about her stop in Rochester, citing the mixture of songs, quality of dancing and the fun elements of the show.

== Tour dates ==
Date	City	Country	Venue
North America
November 19, 2019	Fresno	United States	Warnors Center for the Performing Arts
November 20, 2019	Santa Barbara	United States	Arlington Theatre
November 21, 2019	Ontario	United States	Toyota Arena
November 22, 209	San Jose	United States	San Jose Civic
November 23, 2019	Phoenix	United States	Comerica Theatre
November 25, 2019	Colorado Springs	United States	Broadmoor World Arena
November 26, 2019	Loveland	United States	Budweiser Events Center
November 29, 2019	Rochester	United States	Mayo Civic Center Arena
November 30, 2019	Grand Forks	United States	Chester Fritz Auditorium
December 2, 2019	Sioux Falls	United States	Denny Sanford Premier Center
December 3, 2019	Des Moines	United States	Des Moines Civic Center
December 5, 2019	Milwaukee	United States	Riverside Theater
December 6, 2019	Peoria	United States	Peoria Civic Center Theater
December 7, 2019	Toledo	United States	Stranahan Theater
December 9, 2019	Bethlehem	United States	The Wind Creek Event Center
December 10, 2019	Rochester	United States	Kodak Center for Performing Arts
December 12, 2019	Ledyard	United States	Foxwoods Resort Casino
December 13, 2019	Newark	United States	New Jersey Performing Arts Center
December 14, 2019	Charlottesville	United States	John Paul Jones Arena
December 16, 2019	Greenville	United States	Peace Center
December 17, 2019	Charlotte	United States	Ovens Auditorium
December 18, 2019	Jacksonville	United States	Moran Theater
December 19, 2019	Orlando	United States	Bob Carr Theater
December 20, 2019	Clearwater	United States	Ruth Eckerd Hall
December 21, 2019	Fort Lauderdale	United States	Broward Center for the Performing Arts
December 23, 2019	Fort Myers	United States	Barbara B. Mann Performing Arts Hall

== Personnel ==
Band

- Lindsey Stirling – violin
- Drew Steen – drums
