= Warmer in the Winter Tour =

2017 concert tour by Lindsey Stirling

Warmer In The Winter Tour
- Tour by Lindsey Stirling
- Warmer In The Winter Tour promotion featuring Lindsey Stirling
- Associated album: Warmer in the Winter
- Start date: November 17, 2017
- End date: December 23, 2017
- No. of shows: 31 in North America

Lindsey Stirling concert chronology
- Brave Enough Tour (2016); Warmer in the Winter Tour (2017); Synthesis Live (2018)

The Warmer in the Winter Tour was a 2017 North American concert tour by violinist Lindsey Stirling. This was her fourth concert tour, and first Christmas tour celebrating her album Warmer in the Winter.

== Background ==
In 2017, Stirling released the Christmas album Warmer in the Winter and toured during the festive season in North America. The tour had 31 dates, beginning in Albany, New York, on November 8 and concluding in Phoenix, Arizona, on December 23.

The tour offered a range of premium packages, including a meet-and-greet with Stirling who would also perform a private pre-show concert.

== Set list ==
The following set list is that of the show in Las Vegas, Nevada, on December 22, 2017, not that of all the concerts of the tour.

1. "All I Want for Christmas Is You"
2. "Waiting for the Man With the Bag / Jingle Bell Rock"
3. "Let It Snow! Let It Snow! Let It Snow!"
4. "Warmer in the Winter"
5. "I Saw Three Ships (Come Sailing In)"
6. "Mini Set" (medley on toy instruments)
7. "Hallelujah"
8. "What Child Is This?"
9. "Elements"
10. "What Child Is This?"
11. "Crystallize"
12. "Dance of the Sugar Plum Fairy"
13. "Carol of the Bells"
14. "You're a Mean One, Mr. Grinch"
15. "Christmas C'mon"

Encore

16. "Silent Night"

== Reception ==
Reception to the tour was overwhelmingly positive, with MTV describing it as "Lindsey Stirling wows on her 'warmer in the winter tour'" and advised fans to witness her magic.

Diana Stevens of Burning Hot Events reviewed her final show in Phoenix, AZ with the comments "The “Warmer in the Winter” Tour was like a traveling snow globe, shaken up with a wonderland of lights, sounds, and dancing. Stirling touched hearts with her words and music, and spread smiles with her jokes and shining personality."

== Tour dates ==
Date	City	Country	Venue
North America
November 8, 2017	Albany	United States	Palace Theatre
November 9, 2017	Asbury Park	United States	The Paramount
November 10, 2017	Washington, D.C.	United States	The Anthem
November 11, 2017	Mashantucket	United States	Foxwoods Resort Casino
November 14, 2017	New York City	United States	Beacon Theatre
November 16, 2017	Philadelphia	United States	Academy of Music
November 17, 2017	Boston	United States	Orpheum Theatre
November 22, 2017	Atlanta	United States	Cobb Energy Performing Arts Centre
November 24, 2017	Tampa	United States	Straz Center for the Performing Arts
November 25, 2017	Saint Augustine	United States	Saint Augustine
November 27, 2017	Houston	United States	Revention Music Center
November 28, 2017	San Antonio	United States	Tobin Center
November 29, 2017	El Paso	United States	Abraham Chavez Theatre
December 1, 2017	Grand Prairie	United States	Verizon Theatre
December 2, 2017	Tulsa	United States	BOK Center
December 4, 2017	Omaha	United States	Orpheum
December 5, 2017	Cedar Rapids	United States	US Cellular Center
December 6, 2017	Chicago	United States	Chicago Theater
December 7, 2017	Minneapolis	United States	Orpheum
December 8, 2017	Lawrence	United States	Lied Center
December 9, 2017	Broomfield	United States	1STBANK Center
December 11, 2017	Idaho Falls	United States	Idaho Falls Civic Auditorium
December 12, 2017	Salt Lake City	United States	Eccles Theater
December 14, 2017	Eugene	United States	Hult Center for the Performing Arts
December 15, 2017	Spokane	United States	INB Performing Arts Center
December 16, 2017	Seattle	United States	Paramount Theater
December 18, 2017	Portland	United States	Arlene Schnitzer Concert Hall
December 20, 2017	San Jose	United States	City National Civic
December 21, 2017	Los Angeles	United States	Microsoft Theater
December 22, 2017	Las Vegas	United States	The Cosmopolitan
December 23, 2017	Phoenix	United States	Comerica Theatre

== Personnel ==
Band

- Lindsey Stirling – violin
- Drew Steen – drums
