= Hold My Heart =

Hold My Heart may refer to:

- Hold My Heart (film), a 2002 Norwegian drama film directed by Trygve Allister Diesen
- "Hold My Heart" (song), a song by Lindsey Stirling
- "Hold My Heart", a song by Steps from the album What the Future Holds
- Hold My Heart, an EP by He Is We
