= The Lindsey Stirling Christmas Program Tour =

2021 concert tour by Lindsey Stirling

The Lindsey Stirling Christmas Program
- Tour by Lindsey Stirling
- 2021 Tour Poster
- Associated album: Warmer in the Winter
- Start date: November 26, 2021
- End date: December 23, 2021
- No. of shows: 22 in North America

Lindsey Stirling concert chronology
- Warmer in the Winter Tour (2019); The Lindsey Stirling Christmas Program (2021); Snow Waltz Tour (2022)

The Lindsey Stirling Christmas Program was a 2021 North American concert tour by violinist Lindsey Stirling. This was her fourth Christmas tour, in part celebrating her album Warmer in the Winter.

== Background ==
In 2017, Stirling released the Christmas album Warmer in the Winter and toured that December. It became an annual occurrence with the Wanderland Tour (2018) and the Warmer in the Winter Tour (2019). With the COVID-19 pandemic leaving her unable to tour in 2020, Stirling performed a festive "Lindsey Stirling: Home for the Holidays" live stream concert.

The Lindsey Stirling Christmas Program was a 22-day concert tour across North America. It began in Memphis, Tennessee, on 26 November and concluded on December 23 in Jackson, Mississippi.

== Set list ==
The following set list is representative of the show in Huntsville, Alabama on December 21, 2021. It is not representative of all concerts for the duration of the tour.

1. "All I Want for Christmas Is You"
2. "Christmas C'Mon"
3. "Warmer in the Winter"
4. "Let It Snow! Let It Snow! Let It Snow!""
5. "Jingle Bell Rock"
6. "I Saw Three Ships (Come Sailing In)"
7. "Jingle Bells / Deck the Halls / It's Beginning to Look Like Christmas / Feliz Navidad / Hedwig's Theme / Grandma Got Run Over by a Reindeer"
8. "The Devil Went Down to Georgia"
9. "Sleigh Ride"
10. "Angels We Have Heard on High"
11. "Crystallize"
12. "Hallelujah"
13. "Dance of the Sugar Plum Fairy"
14. "Santa Baby"
15. "Carol of the Bells"
16. "We Three Gentlemen"
17. "You're a Mean One, Mr. Grinch"

Encore

18. "I Wonder as I Wander"

== Reception ==
Reception to the tour was very positive. The Lantern commended the mixture of arrangements Stirling achieved with the songs, and also the quality of dancing and lighting describing it as a feast for the senses. Meanwhile, the Wichita Eagle of Kansas City commended Stirling's performance and variety of the show, noting that her Chihuahua made a guest appearance.

== Tour dates ==
Date	City	Country	Venue
North America
November 26, 2021	Memphis	United States	Cannon Center For the Performing Arts
November 27, 2021	Shreveport	United States	Shreveport Municipal Auditorium
November 29, 2021	Oklahoma City	United States	The Criterion
November 30, 2021	Wichita	United States	Orpheum Theatre
December 1, 2021	Ames	United States	Iowa State Center
December 2, 2021	Grand Rapids	United States	Van Andel Arena
December 3, 2021	Madison	United States	The Sylvee
December 4, 2021	Peoria	United States	Peoria Civic Center Theater
December 6, 2021	Nashville	United States	Brown County Music Center
December 7, 2021	Rockford	United States	Coronado Performing Arts Center
December 8, 2021	Columbus	United States	Palace Theater
December 10, 2021	Binghamton	United States	Visions Veterans Memorial Arena
December 11, 2021	Buffalo	United States	Shea's Performing Arts Center
December 13, 2021	Pittsburgh	United States	Benedum Center for the Performing Arts
December 14, 2021	Providence	United States	Providence Performing Arts Center
December 16, 2021	Reading	United States	Santander Performing Arts Center
December 17, 2021	Charleston	United States	Charleston Municipal Auditorium
December 18, 2021	Augusta	United States	William B. Bell Auditorium
December 20, 2021	Columbia	United States	Koger Center for the Arts
December 21, 2021	Huntsville	United States	Von Braun Center
December 22, 2021	Mobile	United States	Saenger Theater
December 23, 2021	Jackson	United States	Thalia Mara Hall

== Personnel ==
Band

- Lindsey Stirling – violin
- Drew Steen – drums
- Ryan Riveros – keyboards

Dancers

- Addie Byers
- Taylor Gagliano
- Jessica Richens
- Kailyn Rogers
