= Pete's Dragon =

Pete's Dragon is the title of two Disney live-action films:

- Pete's Dragon (1977 film)
- Pete's Dragon (2016 film)
  - Pete's Dragon (soundtrack)
