= The Wanderland Tour =

2018 concert tour by Lindsey Stirling

- Tour by Lindsey Stirling
- Wanderland Tour 2018 Promotional Poster
- Associated album: Warmer In The Winter
- Start date: November 23, 2018
- End date: December 22, 2018
- No. of shows: 24 in North America

Lindsey Stirling concert chronology
- Synthesis Live (2018); Wanderland Tour (2018); Lindsey Stirling Artemis Tour (2019)

The Wanderland Tour is a 2018 North American concert tour by violinist Lindsey Stirling. This was he sixth tour, and third Christmas tour, celebrating her album Warmer In The Winter.

== Background ==
In 2017, Stirling released the Christmas album Warmer In The Winter and toured that December. Following the popularity of the seasonal tour, Stirling returned with a similar Christmas theme tour across 24 dates in North America. It began in Reno, Nevada, on 23 November and concluded on December 22 in North Charleston, South Carolina.

== Set list ==
The following set list is representative of the show in Philadelphia, Pennsylvania, on December 18, 2018. It is not representative of all concerts for the duration of the tour.

1. "All I Want for Christmas Is You"
2. "Christmas C'Mon"
3. "Let It Snow! Let It Snow! Let It Snow!"
4. "Warmer In The Winter"
5. "Waiting for the Man With the Bag / Jingle Bell Rock"
6. "I Saw Three Ships (Come Sailing In)"
7. "Feeling Good"
8. "Jingle Bells / Deck the Halls / It's Beginning to Look Like Christmas / Feliz Navidad / Hedwig's Theme / Grandma Got Run Over by a Reindeer / O Holy Night"
9. "Hallelujah"
10. "Angels We Have Heard on High"
11. "What Child Is This?"
12. "Crystallize"
13. "Dance of the Sugar Plum Fairy"
14. "Santa Baby"
15. "Run Rudolph Run"
16. "We Three Gentlemen"
17. "Carol of the Bells"
18. "You're a Mean One, Mr. Grinch"

Encore

19. "I Wonder as I Wander"

== Reception ==
Reception to the tour was very positive. Writing about the show at The Beacon Theatre, New York for Shutter16 David Zeck wrote "This show is literally the full package, it’s everything a performance should be, besides Stirling flawlessly performing Christmas classics on violin the show also features a heavy influence on many dance styles ranging from contemporary to ballot, ballroom and of course pop dance styles.".

Meanwhile, Music Connection described the show as a "very special evening".

== Tour dates ==
Date	City	Country	Venue
North America
November 23, 2018	Reno	United States	Silver Legacy Resort Casino
November 24, 2018	Sacramento	United States	Golden 1 Center
November 26, 2018	Salt Lake City	United States	Maverik Center
November 27, 2018	Broomfield	United States	1STBANK Center
November 28, 2018	Omaha	United States	Baxter Arena
November 29, 2018	Wichita	United States	INTRUST Bank Arena
November 30, 2018	Springfield	United States	Juanita K. Hammons Hall
December 1, 2018	Oklahoma City	United States	Chesapeake Energy Arena
December 3, 2018	Minneapolis	United States	Orpheum Theatre
December 4, 2018	La Crosse	United States	La Crosse Center Arena
December 5, 2018	Madison	United States	Alliant Energy Center
December 6, 2018	Moline	United States	TaxSlayer Center
December 7, 2018	Bloomington	United States	Grossinger Motors Arena
December 8, 2018	Evansville	United States	Old National Events Plaza
December 10, 2018	Pittsburgh	United States	Benedum Center for the Performing Arts
December 12, 2018	New York	United States	Beacon Theatre
December 13, 2018	Providence	United States	Providence Performing Arts Center
December 14, 2018	Washington, D.C.	United States	The Anthem
December 17, 2018	Wilkes-Barre	United States	The F.M. Kirby Center for the Performing Arts
December 18, 2018	Philadelphia	United States	Metropolitan Opera House
December 19, 2018	Richmond	United States	Altria Theater
December 20, 2018	Savannah	United States	Johnny Mercer Theater
December 21, 2018	Asheville	United States	Thomas Wolfe Civic Center Auditorium
December 22, 2018	North Charleston	United States	North Charleston Performing Arts Center

== Personnel ==
Band

- Lindsey Stirling – violin
- Drew Steen – drums
