= Love's Just a Feeling =

Single by Lindsey Stirling featuring Rooty

from the album Brave Enough
- Released: 6 March 2017 (single); 16 August 2016 (album)
- Genre: Dubstep; classical crossover; electro house; EDM
- Length: 4:24
- Label: Lindseystomp Records
- Songwriters: Lindsey Stirling, Zedd, Toby Gad, Autumn Rowe, Becky Hill, Linus Eklöw, Jihyo, Wendy (singer), Nico Hartikainen
- Producer: Zedd

Lindsey Stirling singles chronology
"Hold My Heart" (2016)	"Love's Just a Feeling" (2017)	"Dance of the Sugar Plum Fairy" (2017)

"Love's Just a Feeling" is a single released in 2017 by violinist Lindsey Stirling featuring vocals from Rooty.

== Background ==
"Love's Just a Feeling" was the final single released from Stirling's third album, Brave Enough. Available on the album since 2016, the single version and its accompanying video for the single were released in March 2017.

The recording was produced by Zedd, who also worked on the writing of the song.

== Music video ==
A music video was released along with the single, directed by Stirling. It features Stirling being injected by a physician and entering a pod, where she has flashback memories to the 1950s with her partner, played by Brett Keating. She later emerges in the future, where a man gives her a red rose similarly to the one she was given by her partner earlier in the video. She returns, upset to the pod and emerges in a dystopian future, a robot brings her a rose and a man emerges from in the distance to hand it to her.

== Charts ==
"Love's Just a Feeling" spent 17 weeks on the Billboard Adult Contemporary chart, peaking at number 22 in March 2018.

Chart (2017–2018)	Peak position
US Adult Contemporary (Billboard)	22
US Adult Pop Airplay (Billboard)	32
