= A Ghost Story (soundtrack) =

2017 film soundtrack album

Film score by Daniel Hart
- Released: July 7, 2017
- Recorded: 2017
- Studios: Redwood Studio, Denton, Texas; The Pensieve, Los Angeles
- Genre: Film score
- Length: 48:22
- Label: Milan
- Producer: Daniel Hart

Daniel Hart chronology
Pete's Dragon (2016)	A Ghost Story (2017)	Heroin(e) (2017)

A Ghost Story is the film score to the 2017 film of the same name directed by David Lowery starring Casey Affleck, Rooney Mara and Will Oldham. The original score is composed by Daniel Hart and released through Milan Records on July 7, 2017.

== Development ==
Daniel Hart composed the score for A Ghost Story, having previously worked with Lowery in Ain't Them Bodies Saints (2013) and Pete's Dragon (2016). Hart considered that the film did not fit into the traditional horror genre and instead viewed it as a meditation on love, loss, grief and the inability to participate in a relationship after death. He intentionally avoided making the music overly emotional or frightening, instead supporting the actions on screen while leaving room for audiences to project their own feelings onto the silent ghost portrayed by Casey Affleck.

To reflect the film's themes of death and acceptance, Hart incorporated choral elements and texts from sources such as Virginia Woolf's A Haunted House, the Tibetan Book of the Dead, and the Biblical book of Ecclesiastes. Hart used lush string ensembles and violin "ghost harmonics" to create an ethereal, fragile atmosphere, while drawing inspiration from minimalist composer Arvo Pärt's tintinnabuli style, which influenced tracks such as "Little Notes" and "Post Pie." Although David Lowery initially referenced John Carpenter's synthesizer-driven scores, those horror-inspired elements were largely removed in favor of a more emotional approach. Hart also cited Komitas as an indirect influence, adapting techniques he developed for The Exorcist into the choral track "Viventes Enim," featuring soprano Katinka Vindelev, to reinforce the film's contemplative themes of mortality and acceptance. Hart also discussed how the film's exploration of time influenced the score indirectly, as he sought to serve the story rather than illustrate abstract concepts.

The first piece of music that went into the film was the song "I Got Overwhelmed" by Hart's Dark Rooms. Hart said that he wrote the song in 2015 even before reading the script for A Ghost Story and was not included in the film. But when he played the song for Lowery during the story discussions, he decided into include it into the script. The song was further modified with the use of Hart's vocals that were sampled and re-pitched with the use of synthesizers. He took the stems from the track, especially in the guitar, strings and vocal synthesizers, and ran them through PaulStretch, an algorithm designed to dramatically slow down audio with an intention of turning into an atmospheric soundscape. He ran multiple elements of the song through PaulStretch that provided the sonic palette. Hart utilized human vocals into the score, ably benefitted by the lack of dialogues, while for the happier elements, Lowery wanted to incorporate a drum machine at the end of the film, especially in the piece "Safe Safe Safe". Drawing on his upbringing in a family of church musicians, Hart incorporated Latin texts and spiritual influences into the score, emphasizing the film's contemplative treatment of mortality and the afterlife.

== Release ==
The soundtrack was released in digital platforms and CDs on July 7, 2017, through Milan Records. A special 180-gram white vinyl housed in an interior Eurosleeve featuring a turn-of-the-century ghost photograph with a glow in the dark coating was released on July 14.

== Reception ==
Phil de Semlyen of Empire wrote "Daniel Hart's score stitches together its long takes with sorrowful strings." Wendy Ide of The Guardian wrote "Lowery leans on Daniel Hart's lush, string-heavy score. There's an unassuming beauty to the music: it's ascendant but hesitant, hinting at the assumed trajectory of souls after death." Roger Clarke of Sight and Sound wrote "Lowery's regular composer Daniel Hart contributes a song, I Get Overwhelmed, which sets the sorrowful mood." Ethan Anderton of /Film called it an "haunting score from Daniel Hart", while Tim Grierson of Screen International called it a "mournful score". David Edelstein of Vulture noted that Hart "makes every instrument as plaintive as a cello and as spooky as a theremin".

David Rooney of The Hollywood Reporter wrote "Daniel Hart's rich score, which includes a tender song written by Affleck's character, is dominated by mournful strings, which accelerate and grow more agitated as the dead husband becomes distressed". Dana Stevens of Slate called it an "achingly lyrical string score by Daniel Hart". Steve Pond of TheWrap called it a "gorgeously evocative music, [that] stands out as part of a brilliantly effective sound design." David Ehrlich of IndieWire listed it as one of the best scores of the 21st century adding "Each piece feels like a distant echo of the soaring Dark Rooms song that Casey Affleck's character records before he dies; the ominous expanse of 'Thesaurus Tuus' offers more queasy future shock than anything you’ll hear in Blade Runner 2049, while the poppy loops of 'Safe Safe Safe' achieve a sense of cosmic acceptance that allows you to hum along in time."

== Track listing ==
No.	Title	Length
1.	"Whatever Hour You Woke"	2:25
2.	"Little Notes"	5:23
3.	"One Door Closes"	3:30
4.	"Post Pie"	4:05
5.	"Gentleman Caller"	4:10
6.	"I Get Overwhelmed" (Dark Rooms)	4:45
7.	"The Secret In The Wall"	4:11
8.	"Viventes Enim"	3:29
9.	"Sciunt Se Esse Mortui"	3:09
10.	"Last One" (Stereo Jane)	2:59
11.	"Thesaurus Tuus"	4:58
12.	"History"	2:16
13.	"Safe Safe Safe"	3:02
Total length:		48:22

== Personnel ==
Credits adapted from liner notes:

- Music composer and producer – Daniel Hart
- Additional music – Bobak Lotfipour, Daniel Hart, John Congleton
- Recording – Daniel Hart, Joey McClellan, Jordan Martin, John Congleton
- Mixing – Daniel Hart, John Congleton, McKenzie Smith
- Executive producer – JC Chamboredon, Stefan Karrer
- Mastering – Jeff Lipton, Maria Rice
- Graphic design and layout – Shawn Lyon
- Production manager – Pablo Manyer
- Musicians
- Alto vocals – Catherine Klassen
- Soprano vocals – Katinka Vindelev
- Tenor vocals – Kenton Kravig
- Cello – Buffi Jacobs, Karen Smith, Shawna Hamilton, Shawna Hamilton
- Guitar – Richard Carpenter
- Viola – Annika Donnen, Catherine Price
- Violin – Veronica Gan, Veronica Gan

== Accolades ==
Award	Date of ceremony	Category	Recipient(s)	Result	Ref.
Georgia Film Critics Association	January 12, 2018	Best Original Song	"I Get Overwhelmed" – Daniel Hart and Dark Rooms	Nominated	
Houston Film Critics Society	January 6, 2018	Best Original Song	"I Get Overwhelmed" – Daniel Hart and Dark Rooms	Nominated	
