= Pete's Dragon (soundtrack) =

Pete's Dragon (Original Motion Picture Soundtrack)

Soundtrack album by Daniel Hart
- Released: August 12, 2016
- Recorded: 2016
- Studio: Air Studios; British Grove Studios
- Genre: Soundtrack; film score
- Length: 75:29
- Label: Walt Disney
- Producer: Daniel Hart; Jake Jackson; David Lowery (exec.); Jim Whitaker (exec.); Adam Borba (exec.)

Daniel Hart chronology
Lost in the Sun (2015)	Pete's Dragon (2016)	A Ghost Story (2017)

Pete's Dragon (Original Motion Picture Soundtrack) is the soundtrack to the 2016 film of the same name directed by David Lowery. The album features three original songs written for the film, as well as four existing tracks, recorded by Bonnie "Prince" Billy, St. Vincent, Leonard Cohen, Bosque Brown, The Lumineers, Lindsey Stirling, Andrew McMahon in the Wilderness and Okkervil River. It also features a new rendition of "Candle on the Water", the only song that was used from the original 1977 film. It also features twenty tracks from the original score composed by Daniel Hart. The album was released by Walt Disney Records on August 12, 2016.

== Development ==
The film was initially set to have an original score written by composer Howard Shore. However, during post-production, Daniel Hart, who previously collaborated with Lowery on Ain't Them Bodies Saints (2013), replaced Shore. The score was recorded at Air Studios and British Grove Studios in London.

In July 2016, the soundtrack was announced with three original songs written for the film: "Something Wild" by electronic violinist Lindsey Stirling featuring Andrew McMahon in the Wilderness, "The Dragon Song" performed by Bonnie "Prince" Billy and written by Lowery and screenwriter Toby Halbrooks, and "Nobody Knows" performed by The Lumineers and co-written by Halbrooks with Andrew Tinker. The only song returning from the original film is a newly recorded version of "Candle on the Water", which is performed by the band Okkervil River. Some of the other songs include: a cover of Karen Dalton's "Something on Your Mind" by St. Vincent, Leonard Cohen's "So Long, Marianne", and Bosque Brown's "Gina Anne". Hart's score fills the remainder of the album, which was released on August 12, 2016.

== Track listing ==
No.	Title	Writer(s)	Performer(s)	Length
1.	"The Dragon Song"	David Lowery; Toby Halbrooks; Bonnie "Prince" Billy	Bonnie "Prince" Billy	2:28
2.	"Something Wild (feat. Andrew McMahon in the Wilderness)"	Andrew McMahon in the Wilderness; Lindsey Stirling; Peter Hanna; Taylor Bird	Lindsey Stirling (feat. Andrew McMahon in the Wilderness)	3:43
3.	"Nobody Knows"	Andrew Tinker; Toby Halbrooks	The Lumineers	3:08
4.	"Something on Your Mind"		St. Vincent	2:59
5.	"So Long, Marianne"		Leonard Cohen	5:38
6.	"Gina Anne"		Bosque Brown	2:40
7.	"An Adventure"			3:04
8.	"Are You Gonna Eat Me?"			2:31
9.	"Brown Bunny"			1:01
10.	"Reverie"			2:52
11.	"Tree Fort"			1:03
12.	"North Star"			1:25
13.	"Bedtime Compass"			2:15
14.	"Timber"			1:19
15.	"Breathe"			2:27
16.	"Gavin Knows What He's Doing"			3:42
17.	"You Are Not Alone"			1:58
18.	"Elliot Gets Lost"			4:26
19.	"Takedown"			1:44
20.	"It'll Be Just Like It Used to Be"			2:03
21.	"Follow That Dragon"			3:01
22.	"Elliot at the Bridge"			2:19
23.	"Abyss"			1:35
24.	"Go North"			1:44
25.	"Saying Goodbye"			5:03
26.	"The Bravest Boy I've Ever Met"			2:46
27.	"The Dragon Song Revisited"		Bonnie "Prince" Billy	2:34
28.	"Candle on the Water"		Okkervil River	4:01
Total length:				75:29

== Reception ==
Bustle writer Johny Brayson said "the new Pete's Dragon isn't a musical like the original, it still sounds like music will be a big part of what makes the film special". Alex Reif of Laughing Place wrote "Like the film, it's substantially different from the original, but offers some great folk songs and a beautiful score. But the true star of the album is Lindsey Stirling and her memorable song "Something Wild.""

Jonathan Broxton of Movie Music UK wrote "Daniel Hart might be a relatively new name in film scoring circles, but the thematic boldness, the orchestral confidence, and the emotion and heart in this score will surely ensure that he doesn't remain anonymous for long." Mfiles wrote "When it comes to a film composer catching their big break and seizing the opportunity with both hands, such instances rarely get more successful than Daniel Hart's work on Pete's Dragon. Although a noted musician in his own right there were question marks as to how effectively he would adapt to the needs of a sweetly sentimental Disney movie; the answer, as it turns out, is magnificently. Not only has he been able to retain his own distinctive air of bluegrass and folk in the form of the various instrumental solos; he's also demonstrated a stunning ability to let rip with an orchestra in a manner that is viscerally powerful yet utterly sincere without a hint of mawkishness. Pete's Dragon is almost certainly one of the best scores of 2016 and if there was any indication that Hart's profoundly melodic voice deserves yet more blockbuster showcases in future, this it."

Filmtracks.com wrote "Pete's Dragon is a really admirable burst into the mainstream for Hart, and specific moments in the work, led by the outstanding blend of tones in "Reverie," merit the highest praise." Pete Simons of Synchrotones wrote "Daniel Hart's Pete's Dragon is absolutely, ridiculously delightful. One of this year's most pleasant surprises and one of the year's greatest highlights – if not the. It's pretty, it's fun, it's exciting, it's epic… and all this without a hint of sarcasm, and without being overly bombastic. It's an unadulterated pleasure from start to finish." Matt Zoller Seitz of RogerEbert.com claimed that Hart's score channelises that of John Williams. Germain Lussier of Gizmodo called the score as "soothing", whereas Michael Rechtshaffen of The Hollywood Reporter wrote "When you factor in the overheated Daniel Hart score that swoops and soars at the slightest provocation, you just might find yourself pining for the simpler, comparatively more melodic charms of Helen Reddy crooning 'Candle on the Water.'"

== Credits ==
Credits adapted from AllMusic.

- Josh Abraham – producer
- Chris Barrett – scoring recordist
- Adam Borba – executive producer
- Thomas Bowes – orchestra leader
- Jo Changer – orchestra contractor
- Annie Clark – producer
- Donna Cole-Brulé – music business affairs
- Terry Edwards – chorus master
- Patricia Sullivan Fourstar – mastering
- Jeremiah Fraites – producer
- Kaylin Frank – creative assistance
- Isobel Griffiths – orchestra contractor
- Brad Haehnel – mixing
- Toby Halbrooks – arranger
- Daniel Hart – composer, score producer
- Ryan Hewitt – engineer
- Scott Holtzman – music business affairs
- Ryan Hopman – producer
- Jake Jackson – engineer, score producer
- Kevin Kaska – conductor, orchestration
- Danny Kiely – engineer
- Mitchell Leib – executive in charge of music
- London Voices – choir/chorus
- David Lowery – executive producer, lyricist
- Mark Needham – mixing
- Ben O'Neill – mixing
- Will Oldham – arranger, producer
- Adam Olmsted – pro-tools
- Phil Palazzolo – engineer
- Ben Parry – chorus master
- Wesley Schultz – producer
- Marc Shaw – music business affairs
- Will Sheff – producer
- Nico Stadl – producer
- Steve Sterling – design
- Lindsey Stirling – violin
- Jill Streater – librarian
- Andrew Tinker – text
- Tusi – engineer
- Dino Valenti – text
- Jimi Whitaker – executive producer
- Booker White – music preparation
- Mark Jan Wlodarkiewicz – editing
