= Lindsey Stirling =

American musician (born 1986)

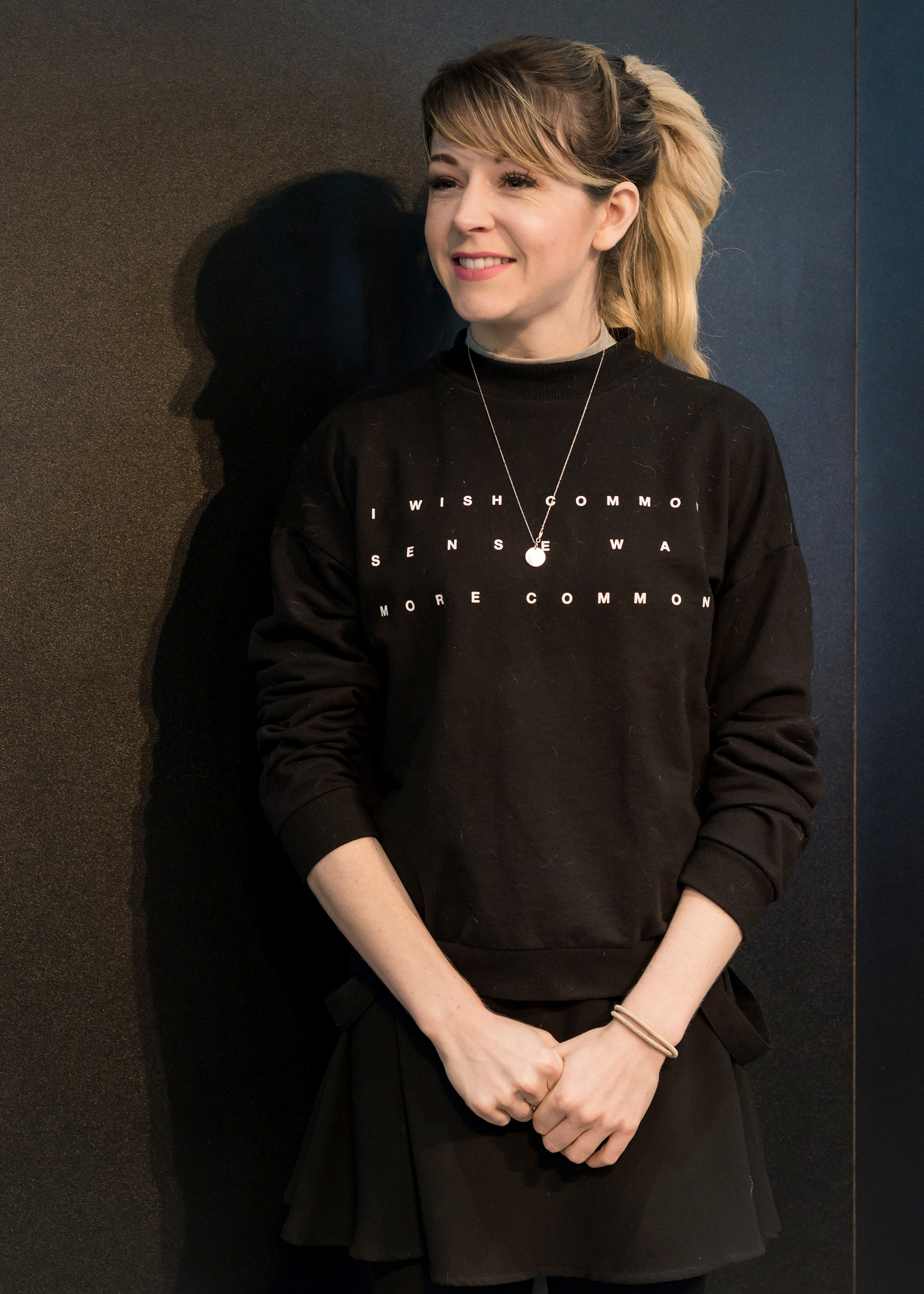
- Stirling in January 2018
- Born: September 21, 1986 (age 40); Santa Ana, California, U.S.
- Occupations: Violinist; songwriter
- Musical career
- Genres: Electronic; classical; dubstep
- Instrument: Violin
- Labels: Lindseystomp; BMG; Concord; Capitol; Universal

YouTube information
- Channel: Lindsey Stirling
- Genre: Music
- Subscribers: 14.4 million
- Views: 4.38 billion
- Last updated: November 3, 2026
- Website: lindseystirling.com

Lindsey Stirling (born September 21, 1986) is an American violinist and songwriter. She presents choreographed violin performances, in live and music videos found on her official YouTube channel, which she created in 2007.

Stirling performs a variety of music styles, from classical to pop and rock to electronic dance music. Aside from original work, her discography contains performances of works by other composers such as Johann Sebastian Bach, Ludwig van Beethoven, Wolfgang Amadeus Mozart, and Antonio Vivaldi and covers of various soundtracks. Her music video "Crystallize" finished as the eighth-most watched video of 2012 on YouTube, and her cover version of "Radioactive" with Pentatonix won Response of the Year in the first YouTube Music Awards in 2013. Stirling achieved one million singles sold worldwide by August 2014. As of May 10, 2023, her Lindseystomp YouTube channel exceeded 13 million subscribers and over 3 billion total views.

Stirling has been named in Forbes magazine's 30 Under 30 in Music: The Class of 2015. Forbes notes her quarter-finalist position on America's Got Talent season five in 2010, a No. 2 position on the Billboard 200 for her second album Shatter Me in 2014, and her 11 million subscribers on YouTube.

Stirling's debut album was a commercial success in Europe, selling 200,000 copies in Germany, winning a platinum certification; three additional certifications were given by Austria, Switzerland, and Poland. The album was nominated for the 2014 Billboard Music Awards for Top Dance/Electronic Albums. Stirling's second album Shatter Me won Top Dance/Electronic Album at the 2015 Billboard Music Awards.

== Early life and childhood ==
Stirling is the middle child of three daughters of Stephen and Diane Stirling. Stirling describes her childhood as being raised in a modest household and stated "I would not trade my humble childhood years for anything else." Due to her family's financial limitations, her parents could only afford to find a violin teacher who would give her half lessons. Although they were told by instructors that "a child isn't going to learn how to play in 15 minutes a week", her parents persisted, and at the age of five, she began taking violin lessons.

Living in Gilbert, Arizona, Stirling attended Greenfield Junior High, and at age sixteen, Stirling attended Mesquite High School and joined four friends in a rock band called Stomp on Melvin. As part of her experience with the group, Stirling wrote a solo violin rock song, and her performance helped her to win the state title of Arizona's Junior Miss and claim the Spirit Award in the America's Junior Miss Finals competition. Stirling was also a member of Charley Jenkins Band for about a year.

From a young age, Stirling had a fascination for dance and desired to take both dancing and violin lessons. In an interview with NewMediaRockstars, she said, "...ever since I was a kid, I've always wished that I could dance, but my parents said, 'You [can] choose violin or you [can] choose dance, but we can't afford both', and I chose violin. So this is kind of a fulfillment – it's funny to say, but this is something I've always wanted to do."

== Career ==
=== 2010–2012: America's Got Talent and debut studio album ===
In 2010, at the age of 23, Stirling was a quarter-finalist on season five of America's Got Talent, where she was described as a "hip hop violinist". She impressed the judges not only by mixing hip-hop, pop, and classical music on the violin, but by incorporating dancing with playing the violin, which she also does on her tours and official music videos. On a live-chat, Stirling explained, "It is very unnatural to dance while playing the violin. I had to practice so hard to learn how to do it, but now it is part of my expression and it comes naturally. I have to know a song perfectly before I can even begin to move. Once I know a song really well, I can then have fun dancing." Dancing made a huge impact not only in her performances, but also with her music: "I loved dance music so I started with that and wrote 'Transcendence', 'Electric Daisy', and 'Spontaneous Me'."

Stirling's performances were dubbed "electrifying" by the judges, and won the acclaim of the audience, but after she attempted to step up the dance level in her quarter-final performance, judge Piers Morgan buzzed her. He told her: "You're not untalented, but you're not good enough, I don't think, to get away with flying through the air and trying to play the violin at the same time." Sharon Osbourne commented: "You need to be in a group. ... What you're doing is not enough to fill a theater in Vegas." In her blog, Stirling confided: "I was devastated at the results ... It was painful, and a bit humiliating; however, I had to relearn where it was that I drew my strength." Stirling decided to continue to embrace her unique style of performance, promoting herself on the Internet. In a 2012 interview she remarked: "A lot of people have told me along the way that my style and the music I do ... is unmarketable. But the only reason I'm successful is because I have stayed true to myself."

Shortly after her performance on America's Got Talent, cinematographer Devin Graham contacted her in hopes of collaborating on a YouTube video. They agreed to shoot a music video for her song, "Spontaneous Me", that was filmed the week of May 9, 2011. The video boosted Stirling's popularity, and she began making music videos regularly for her YouTube channel. Stirling's channel, Lindseystomp, which she created in 2007 and named after her first band Stomp on Melvin, is the main repository for her music videos. Throughout 2011, the channel rapidly gained popularity and has since reached over 3 billion total views and over 12 million subscribers, as of November 2018. Shortly after the release of "Crystallize", Lindsey performed her first ever ticketed concert at the Studio at Webster Hall (also referred to as "The Basement") on May 16, 2012. This was also her first ever time performing with her drummer Drew Steen.

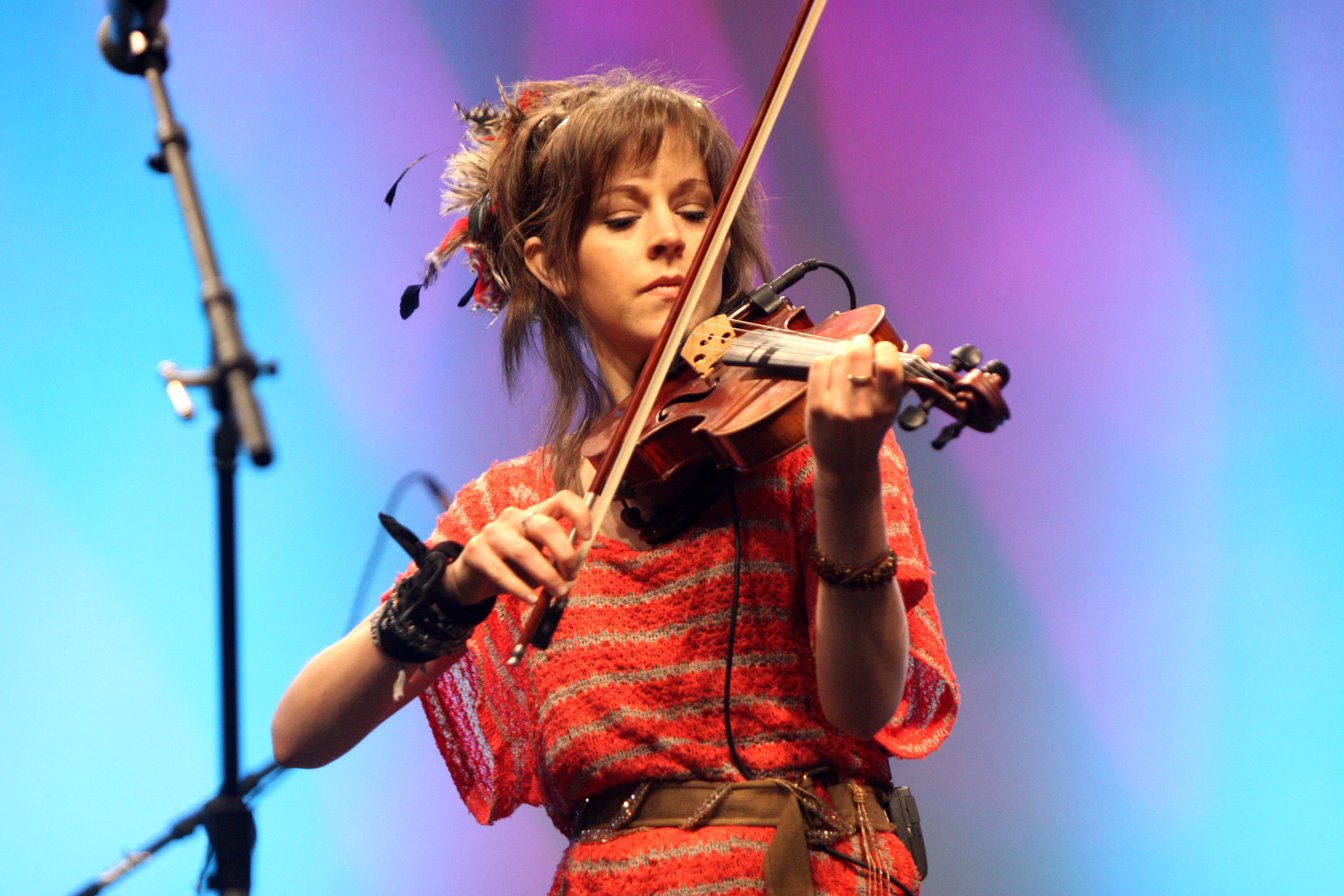
Stirling at VidCon 2012

Stirling has experimented in combining violin playing with hip hop and dubstep. Stirling's collaborations with other musicians and singers have included Amy Lee (Evanescence) (Love Goes On And On), Shaun Barrowes ("Don't Carry It All" – The Decemberists), Jake Bruene and Frank Sacramone ("Party Rock Anthem" – LMFAO), Tay Zonday ("Mama Economy"), Peter Hollens ("Skyrim", "A Thousand Years", "Game of Thrones" and "Star Wars"), Lzzy Hale ("Shatter Me"), Alisha Popat ("We Found Love"), John Allred ("Tomb"), Amiee Proal ("A Thousand Years"), Megan Nicole ("Starships"), The Piano Guys ("Mission Impossible"), Debi Richards (née Johanson) ("River Flows in You", "Phantom of the Opera"), Sam Tsui ("Heads Up"), Tyler Ward ("I Knew You Were Trouble", Thrift Shop", "Some Kind of Beautiful"), Kurt Hugo Schneider ("Pokémon Dubstep Remix" and "A Thousand Years"), John Legend ("All of Me"), Chester See ("I Knew You Were Trouble"), and Pentatonix ("Radioactive", "Papaoutai", "Over the River"). She has also collaborated with the Salt Lake Pops orchestra and Alex Boye.

Stirling's eponymous debut album was released on September 18, 2012, in conjunction with a North American tour that same month.

In December 2012, YouTube announced that Stirling's song, "Crystallize", was the No. 8 most viewed video of 2012 with over 42 million views.

=== 2013–2014: First World Tour and Shatter Me ===
On April 22, 2013, it was announced that Lady Gaga's manager (Troy Carter) signed a deal with Stirling after being impressed by her rise in the media. "By looking at the numbers, automatically you could see this girl knew how to move the needle and understood YouTube was a venue to engage fans both online and offline", Carter said. Stirling, who had previously refused to work with other management companies explained her new deal with Carter: "But with Atom Factory, they were up to date on current things and trying new stuff all the time, and I felt so creatively alive when I met with them."

On June 21, Stirling received her first golden certification for her album, Lindsey Stirling, in Germany, and in the next month, she earned golden certifications from Switzerland and Austria. On August 2, 2013, Billboard announced that Stirling's studio album had sold more than 158,000 copies in the United States and that she was the second best-selling artist on the Classical Crossover charts in 2013, behind Andrea Bocelli's album Passione.

In June 2013, she performed at the Miss Switzerland pageant, and in July, she joined Nathan Pacheco, The Orchestra at Temple Square and the Mormon Tabernacle Choir at the 21,000-seat LDS Conference Center in Salt Lake City, UT for their annual Pioneer Day concert where she performed Scotland the Brave and Simple Gifts. Stirling also announced her first tour dates in Australia, South Korea and Japan. Stirling's YouTube channel reached three million subscribers on August 31 and on September 4, after almost a year of touring, she completed her first world tour with her last appearance in London. On September 12, Stirling performed at the Dreamball 2013 charity gala at Ritz Carlton in Berlin, Germany. Two weeks later, Stirling announced on her website that she had started making her second album.

In October 2013, Stirling announced that she would take part in season three of Dance Showdown, a dance competition web series created by DanceOn in which the winner is awarded US$50,000. Stirling finished as the runner-up among the three finalists but did not win the $50,000 prize, despite receiving critical acclaim for her three performances with her partner, Anze Skrube.

Almost a year after its official release, Stirling's self-titled studio album was re-released on October 29, 2013, as an exclusive deluxe version featuring newly recorded versions and remixes of her best-known songs such as "Crystallize", "Elements", and "Transcendence". Target carried four bonus tracks while all other retailers had two additional tracks. Stirling sold 10,000 copies of her extended-version album in the first week, a record for her, and her album surged from No. 79 to No. 23, its peak position in the Billboard 200. Days earlier, she had performed on Conan on October 24.

On November 3, 2013, Stirling and Pentatonix's version of "Radioactive" won a YouTube Music Award in the category Response of the Year. Stirling also performed during the live-streamed event. On December 16, Stirling announced the first tour dates in Canada and U.S. on her 2014 World Tour; some pre-sales were sold out after the first day and the first concert to be sold out was in Portland, Oregon, on January 29.

Stirling appeared on several Billboard 2013 year-end charts; notably, No. 3 on Classical Album Artists, No. 2 on Classical Albums, and No. 3 on Dance/Electronic Albums (both for Lindsey Stirling).

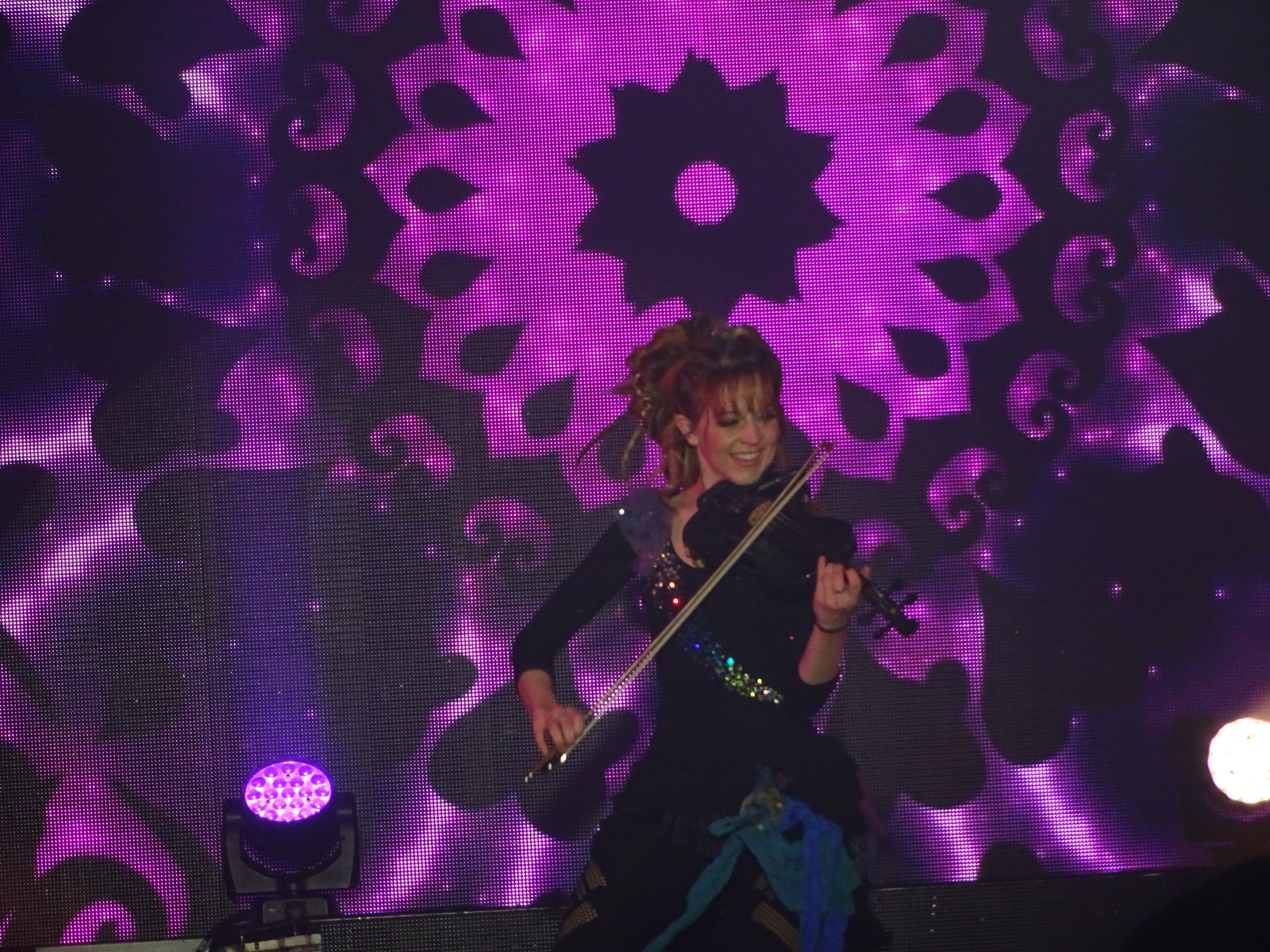
Stirling performing on The Music Box Tour in Cenon, France in 2014

At the beginning of 2014, Stirling's self-titled album hit gold in Poland, received its first platinum certification in Germany and later on in Austria. Stirling received her first RIAA gold certification on February 4 for her hit single "Crystallize". On February 26, Stirling released her debut album in France which entered the charts at number 17 selling 4,900 copies in its first week. On March 5, Stirling performed three concerts at the El Plaza Condesa in Mexico City, her first concerts in Latin America.

In 2014, Stirling was nominated for the Echo music award in two categories: Crossover National/International and Newcomer International, receiving the Crossover National/International award on March 28.

On March 12, 2014, Stirling posted a video announcing her second studio album, Shatter Me, would be released in May. She also created a PledgeMusic account where consumers could buy her new album, signed or not, and also exclusive items, such as signed posters, personalized videos, and even Skype calls with Stirling herself. At the end of the first day, the signed Shatter Me CD was already sold out. On March 25, Stirling officially released her first single from Shatter Me, entitled "Beyond the Veil", along with its accompanying music video. On April 3, Stirling posted that she collaborated with Owl City for his fifth album. The song, "Beautiful Times", was released on April 8.

On April 23, 2014, Stirling released the second single from her upcoming album: "Shatter Me". The song, the album's title track, accumulated 1.3 million views on its first day online. The album was released in the U.S. on April 29 and in Europe on May 2. In the U.S., the album sold 56,000 copies in its first week and reached No. 2 on the Billboard 200, becoming Stirling's biggest sales week ever. In Europe, Shatter Me reached the Top 5 in Sweden and Germany and number one in Austria. On May 18, Stirling appeared on the Billboard Music Awards where her debut album had been nominated in the category "Top Electronic/Dance Album". Stirling performed her first single "Beyond the Veil" during the ceremony.

On May 13, 2014, Stirling performed in San Diego, the first show of her second world tour which totalled 77 shows, 48 in North America and 29 in Europe. This world tour was in support of her new album Shatter Me. The crew consisted of Jason Gaviati and Drew Steen (who had been part of her First World Tour) plus two new dancers: Stephen Jones and Pter Styles and choreographer Anže Škrube.

On July 2, Billboard reported that Stirling's second studio album Shatter Me had been the third dance/electronic album to have its highest sales in the first half of the year (119,000), behind only Daft Punk's Random Access Memories and Lady Gaga's Artpop. In the same chart, Stirling's debut studio album held sixth place with 108,000 copies sold in the first half of 2014. On July 27 Stirling's hit single "Crystallize" became her first music video to mark 100 million views. Six days later, on August 2, Stirling posted on her Twitter account that she had been nominated for her first ever Teen Choice award. On August 6, Stirling returned after four years to America's Got Talent to perform with Lzzy Hale their single "Shatter Me".

In August, it was revealed that Stirling would be part of two collaborations. The first one was revealed on August 13, and was about Stirling collaborating for a second time with the a cappella group Pentatonix for their third studio album PTX, Vol. III on the song "Papaoutai", by Stromae. The second collaboration was revealed nine days later, on August 22, when it was announced Stirling had recorded a song with singer Jessie J for J's upcoming album Sweet Talker. On September 14, it was announced that Stirling would join a YouTube marketing campaign for a new selection of Lindt chocolate candy bars. On September 29, Stirling announced she would be joining tenor Andrea Bocelli for his UK and Ireland Tour in November 2014. On October 4, Stirling started the European leg of her second world tour in Finland, in support of her album Shatter Me. On November 24, Stirling extended her tour to the year of 2015 by adding dates in North America and Oceania. That same day Stirling performed on The Today Show to promote her album by performing "Roundtable Rival". On December 5, Stirling performed at the Video Game Awards.

On the 2014 Year-End Billboard Charts, Stirling peaked in the categories of Classical Albums with Shatter Me and Classical Album Artists. Her second studio album also appeared tenth in the year-end charts of independent albums and fourth in Dance/Electronic Albums. Stirling had the second position in the Dance/Electronic Album Artists and fifth in the charts of independent artist and Top dance/electronic artists.

=== 2015–2018: The Only Pirate at the Party, Brave Enough, Dancing with the Stars and Warmer in the Winter ===
On January 9, 2015, Stirling was featured on the Forbes list '30 Under 30' as one of the few musicians featured in the top thirty of recognized celebrities under the age of thirty. On the same day Billboard announced that Shatter Me and Lindsey Stirling had reached the first and second positions as the best-selling dance-electronic albums in 2014. On February 7, 2015, Stirling performed at the Grammy Foundation's 17th annual Legacy Concert. A few days later, Stirling announced that public television would be airing her shows from London under the name Lindsey Stirling: Live from London, starting in March. It was later added that the shows would also air in the U.S.

Stirling in Buenos Aires in April 2015 as part of her Shatter Me World Tour

On March 2, it was announced that Stirling had won a YouTube Music Award among other forty-nine artists. The fifty selected artists were the ones with biggest growth in views, subscribers and engagement over the last six months. This is Stirling's second YouTube Music Award. On March 23, the 2015 YouTube Music Awards were broadcast online, with thirteen artists releasing original music videos. Stirling released the music video for "Take Flight". On March 26, Stirling participated in the 2015 Echo Music Awards, winning the category of "Best Crossover Act" for the second consecutive year. Stirling also performed at the Echo Awards with artist Andreas Bourani. On April 7, the 2015 Billboard Music Awards nominated Stirling in two categories: Top Dance/Electronic Artist and Top Dance/Electronic Album, for her album Shatter Me. Stirling won the latter category, her first Billboard Music Award. On May 4, a single from Marina Kaye'e Fearless album was released under the title "Sounds Like Heaven", featuring Stirling. A day later a collaboration between Stirling and Joy Enriquez was released on iTunes.

On July 1, during an interview by Billboard in New York, Stirling said that when her tour finished in August she would begin work on her third studio album: "As soon as we finish this tour, mid-August, I'm just gonna jump straight into the studio, it's pretty exciting and it's also terrifying to start thinking about a new album again. But I'm honestly so excited to see where it goes. I have a lot of ideas on directions it could go, and I'm really excited to see which way it could go. But the truth is, I don't know where it's going!"

In its July 22 issue, Variety magazine ranked Stirling eleventh on its Digital Star Ranking, of the top twelve stars in the digital world. It was estimated that Stirling's annual ad income was $364,000. On August 8, 2015, Stirling released her first video album "Lindsey Stirling: Live from London", which included part of her Music Box Tour. The album reached the top ten of the German album charts, for the third consecutive time. It also reached the top position on the German music DVD charts. In the same month, Stirling played the National Anthem before the start of an Arizona Diamondbacks game at Chase Field.

In late December 2015, Stirling earned her first US Billboard Hot 100 entry with "Hallelujah" debuting at number 81 on the issue dated January 9, 2016, and peaking at number one on the Hot Christian Songs Chart, being her first single in doing so as well.

Stirling had announced in June 2015 that over the course of two and a half years, she had written an autobiography, The Only Pirate at the Party, to be published by Gallery Books. Co-authored by Brooke S. Passey, Stirling's sister, the book was released on January 12, 2016, and was listed at No. 10 on The New York Times hardcover nonfiction best-seller list for January 31, 2016. The book's title came from Stirling's diagnosis of cross-dominance in the second grade, for which an eye patch was prescribed. She was uncomfortable with the treatment until she began pretending she was a pirate. Stirling became intrigued by the pirate lifestyle, and said:

Pirates don't take orders or ask permission,... They do what they want. Allow me to clarify. If your mom asks you to do the dishes, do not pull out your pirate attitude. But if someone tells you you're not good enough, says your dreams are too lofty, or claims there is no room in showbiz for a dancing violinist — well then, by all means, pull out your eye patch, my friend, and take to the high seas.

In January 2016, Stirling's autobiography was released and later reached tenth place on The New York Times hardcover nonfiction best-seller list. Three days later, a collaboration between Stirling and the Swedish DJ/producer Otto Knows was released under the title "Dying for You", with its video premiering on February 1.

In June 2016, Stirling announced her new studio album Brave Enough, set for release on August 19, 2016. Shortly after, she uploaded a new music video "The Arena" to her main channel. Brave Enough debuted at number one on the US Dance/Electronic Albums chart and peaked at number 5 on the Billboard 200. Stirling released an exclusive track "Firefly" with Brave Enough via Pledge Music, with Stirling on vocals. The song was later used in the movie Barbie: Star Light Adventure. In August 2016, Stirling released the song "Something Wild" which she wrote for the Disney movie, Pete's Dragon. The song played over the end credits and both Brave Enough and the movie soundtrack. Stirling appeared on several television shows in August to promote her new album, including The Today Show and ZDF's Morgenmagazin in Germany, performing "The Arena" live. During the same month, Stirling performed at the opening ceremony of The International 2016, a Dota 2 tournament which had the biggest prize pool in eSports history. Later Stirling also appeared in a Schön! magazine photoshoot and feature interview.

In September 2016, Stirling started her Brave Enough Tour in San Diego, California, that continued worldwide for 79 dates. Stirling also performed the national anthem and a pre-game concert wearing a 49ers jersey for the San Francisco 49ers season opener against the Los Angeles Rams at Levi's Stadium. September also marked the release of three special editions of Brave Enough. All released exclusively on vinyl, there was a red swirl disc edition, a Barnes & Noble exclusive featuring the bonus track "Activate" and an Urban Outfitters edition limited to 500 copies with an autographed postcard from Stiring enclosed. Stirling was also featured on the cover of fashion & lifestyle magazine Bello for their Summer edition.

In October 2016, Stirling launched a music video for the single "Prism", featuring herself as five clones named "The Violindseys". The same month, Stirling was featured on the cover of Strings Magazine. The following month, Stirling released the single Hold My Heart featuring ZZ Ward along with an Alice in Wonderland-themed video. A second video was later released in collaboration with HP, featuring Stirling playing both herself and her alter-ego super fan Phelba. Stirling was one of the first artists to record for the newly launched Spotify Singles. Stirling recorded two acoustic tracks at Spotify Studios in New York City, her single, Something Wild and a cover of "7 Years" by Lukas Graham. They were premiered on the streaming service on November 30, 2016.

Stirling began 2017 by launching a single version and video of her song "Love's Just a Feeling" featuring Rooty. Later in the year Stirling and Rooty performed the song on Live with Kelly and Ryan. Bebe Rexha sampled "First Light" from Brave Enough and credited Lindsey Stirling in the song Small Doses as violinist on her EP All Your Fault: Pt. 1 released in February. In April, following her performance in London for the Brave Enough Tour, Stirling gave an interview and live performance on BBC's The One Show in the UK. On the same trip, Stirling also appeared on BBC Radio 2. For Record Store Day 2017, Stirling released a limited edition vinyl copy of Brave Enough. The gatefold was signed by Stirling and limited to 650 copies worldwide. Later that month, she performed at the Radio Disney Music Awards at the Microsoft Theater in Los Angeles. Stirling performed as part of a line up with Julia Michaels and Noah Cyrus The following month, a documentary called Lindsey Stirling: Brave Enough was released as paid content via YouTube. The documentary was filmed during Stirling's Brave Enough Tour and featured concert footage, interviews and personal footage. In the same month, Stirling was featured in digital fashion and lifestyle magazine, Phoenix.

In September 2017, Stirling was announced as one of the celebrities to compete on season 25 of Dancing with the Stars. She was paired with professional dancer Mark Ballas. During the course of the show, Stirling had two serious injuries that nearly ruled her out of the competition. First suffering a blunt rib injury and possible separation during training and later a knee injury during a rehearsal for a group dance. Stirling's performance in week 4 of the competition was in memory of her father, Stephen, who died in January of that year from cancer. Professional dance partner Ballas wore a hat and scarf of Stirling's father for the performance. Stirling and Ballas finished in second place, averaging a score of 27.1, and secured 5 perfect score performances across the 17 dances.

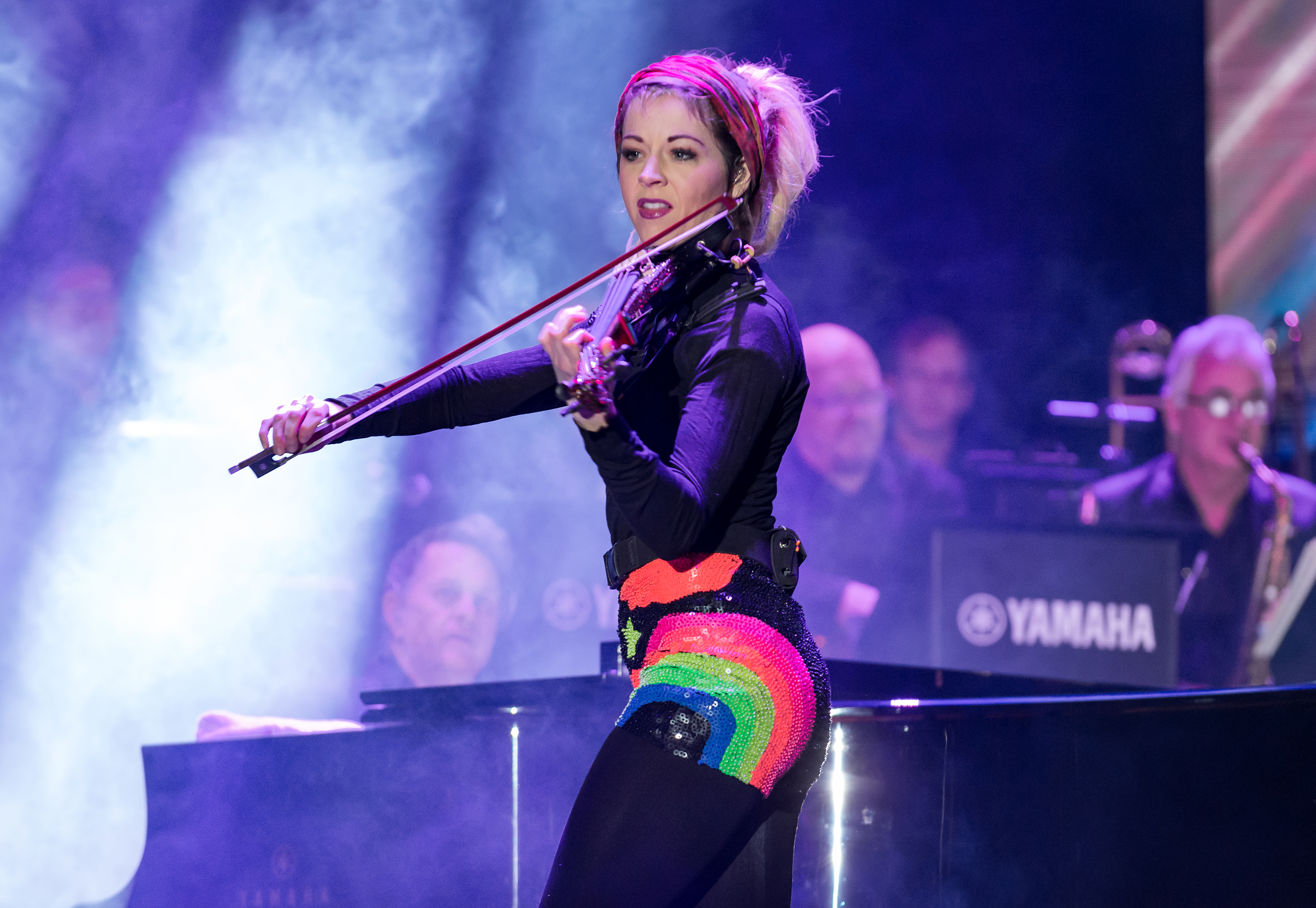
Stirling in the 2018 Yamaha All-Star Concert

In early October 2017, a Bollywood themed music video for the song "Mirage" was released featuring Raja Kumari. Later that month, Stirling released her fourth studio album Warmer in the Winter, a holiday-themed record. The album features Becky G, Trombone Shorty, Alex Gaskarth of All Time Low, and Sabrina Carpenter. The album opened at No. 32 on the Billboard 200, selling 15,000 copies, making her fourth Top 40 album. In November, Stirling went on her North American Warmer in the Winter Tour celebrating the new album. The following October, Stirling released a Deluxe version of "Warmer in the Winter" which featured five additional tracks. In addition, a music video for "I Wonder as I Wander" was released. Stirling commenced her Wanderland Tour celebrating the festive album across 24 dates in North America. In November 2018 for Record Store Day's Black Friday event, Stirling released a special Holiday Edition picture disc vinyl. The record featured images of Stirling from her Warmer in the Winter photoshoot imprinted onto the vinyl record itself. The dual-sided single had two tracks - "You're A Mean One Mr. Grinch" and "Dance of the Sugar Plum Fairy". It was limited to 2350 copies.

In 2018, she appeared on the track "Hi-Lo", the third track of Evanescence's fourth studio album Synthesis released as a single in June. Stirling toured with the band in the U.S. during that summer. Stirling also appeared at the Yamaha All-Star Concert in Anaheim in January 2018. Stirling collaborated with Alexander Jean on the song "Deeper" released in mid-2018. This made a re-connection between Stirling and her DWTS partner Mark Ballas.

In late 2018, Stirling made a number of television appearances. She returned to Dancing With The Stars for a guest appearance on the October 15, 2018 episode, dancing a "trio dance" with Bobby Bones and Sharna Burgess. Later that month, Stirling appeared in an episode of the first series of The Outpost, playing the character Pock. In November, Stirling was on the cover of French lifestyle publication, Grumpy Magazine. She also released a video for "You're a Mean One Mr Grinch" featuring Sabrina Carpenter, originally from her 2017 album Warmer in the Winter. In December, Stirling was a guest on Darci Lynne: My Hometown Christmas. In an interview later that month, Stirling revealed in an exclusive interview with the Huffington Post, that she was invited to join the first season of America's Got Talent: The Champions but declined.

=== 2019–2021: Artemis, World Tour, String Sessions and Lose You Now (EP) ===
On June 21, 2019, Stirling announced that her fifth album, Artemis would be launching later that year. Stirling said that she had been inspired by the Greek goddess Artemis, and drew parallels to her own experiences and challenges. The first single released from the album was "Underground". It was a joint audio and music video release. On the same day, Stirling announced her Artemis Tour. The tour began in Mexico and Europe in 2019, but was postponed during the COVID-19 pandemic. The tour returned in North America in 2021, however tour dates in Australia, Russia and Ukraine were later canceled. Alongside the album launch, it was revealed Stirling would be releasing a six-part comic book series under the title Artemis.

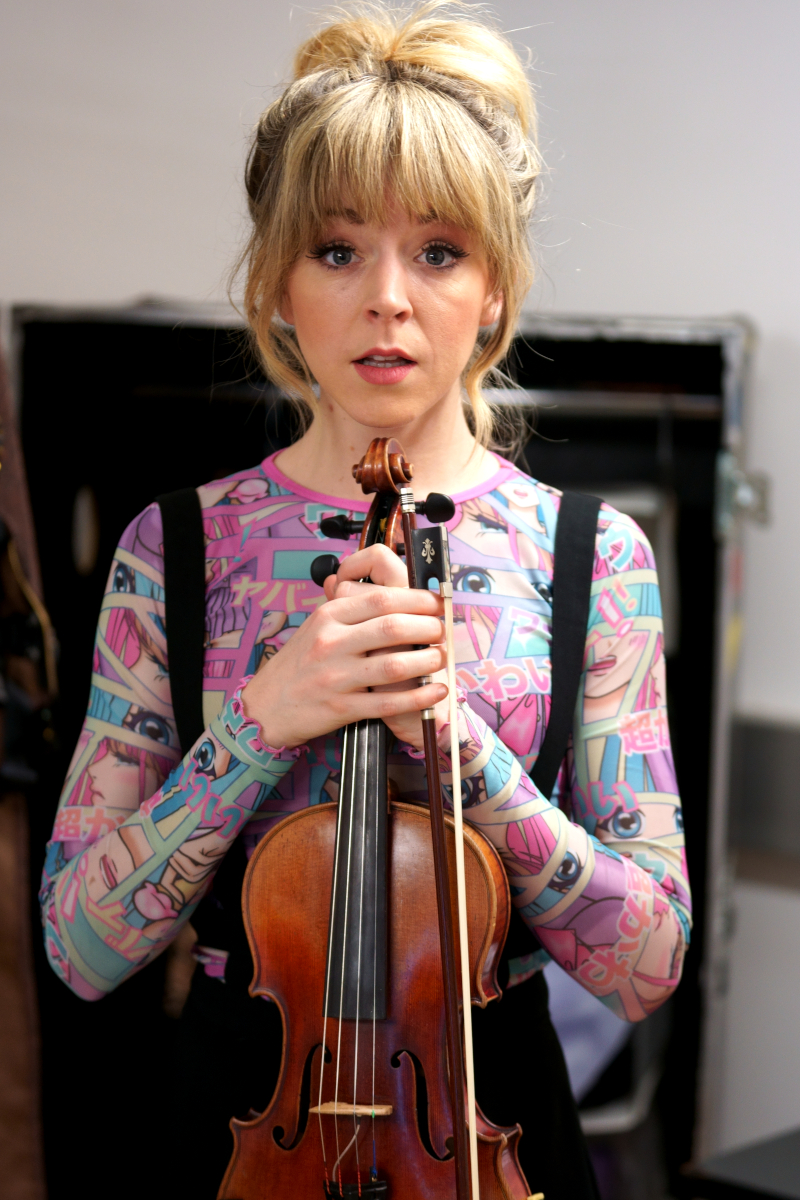
Stirling in Vienna, Austria on the 2019 Artemis Tour

In July 2019, Stirling performed The Upside, a single from the album, at PBS's A Capitol Fourth celebration. Later the song was re-released with vocals by Elle King, along with a music video and a television performance on Live with Kelly and Ryan.

In November 2019, Stirling reprised her holiday-themed tours, embarking on the Warmer in the Winter Christmas Tour across 26 dates in North America. This was her third holiday-themed tour based around the album "Warmer in the Winter". During the tour, her video for "We Three Gentlemen" was released. Stirling was featured on the cover of Guitar Girl Magazine for their Winter 2019 issue. In November, Stirling's collaboration with Switchfoot on the song Voices was released. It was the lead single from their album Native Tongue.

Across 2019, a number of Stirling's songs would be used on television and movie soundtracks. "Dance of the Sugar Plum Fairy" in The Knight Before Christmas, "The Phoenix" in The Chilling Adventures of Sabrina and the "Phantom of the Opera" medley in The Umbrella Academy.

In March 2020, NASA released a video of Stirling performing the song "Artemis" at the Kennedy Space Center. The song shares a name with the NASA Artemis program which has the goal to return humans to the moon in 2024, including the first woman. As part of the "Artemis" album, Stirling would release a number of music videos for tracks not released as singles that matched the storyline of the album. In June 2020, the video for "Between Twilight" was released featuring professional dancer Derek Hough. The video storyline is showing Artemis (Stirling) meeting Orion (Hough) and falling in love. Later in September 2020, a video for "Til The Light Goes Out" was released with Stirling acting as the leader of a small band of mystics living in the desert.

In May 2020, Stirling launched a weekly podcast called "String Sessions" and featuring music artists. Every episode is started with a string (violin) cover of a song by the featured artist. The podcast is made available on YouTube, Spotify, and Google Podcasts. Guests have included Andy Grammer, Amy Lee from Evanescence, JP Saxe x Julia Michaels, Gabby Barrett and Johnny Rzeznik.

In July 2020, Stirling celebrated 3 billion views on her YouTube channel.

In August 2020, Lindsey Stirling was announced as a second-time collaborator with Evanescence for the third single, Use My Voice, alongside many rock singers as well as past collaborator Lzzy Hale. Including Stirling and Hale were Taylor Momsen from The Pretty Reckless, Sharon den Adel from Within Temptation, Deena Jakoub from Veridia and many more of Evanescence close family and friends. In the same month, Stirling released the single "What You're Made Of" featuring guest lyrics from Kiesza. The song was written for the video game, Azur Lane. In September, No Saving Me by Philmon Lee was released featuring Stirling. Stirling also collaborated with American post-hardcore band Escape the Fate on the song "Invincible" in October. A music video was also released for the song which included Stirling herself. Stirling was on the cover of Civilian Magazine for their Fall/Winter 2020 issue with an exclusive interview and photoshoot.

Stirling opened 2021 releasing the single "Lose You Now" in collaboration with DJ Mako. It was based on her original song, "Guardian", from Artemis. Mako wrote the lyrics for the song, and a music video was released on January 15. The song peaked at No. 3 on the Billboard Dance/Electronic Digital Song Sales chart for the week ending January 30. In April 2021, an acoustic version of the song was also released. During the same month, Stirling released a cover and music video of the song Wild Rift from the popular video game, League of Legends. Stirling was also featured at this time in an advertising campaign for the Asus Zenbook.

In July 2021, Stirling released her second ever EP for Record Store Day. Titled "Lose You Now" the five-track EP was a vinyl exclusive, limited to 2,000 copies with an etched B-Side. The same month, a video for the song "Masquerade" from Artemis was released, based around a silent movie. The video was filmed in the Orpheum Theatre in Los Angeles. Following this, Stirling released further video game collaborations. In August 2021, she performed a version of the Tales of Arise score for the opening night of Gamescom. Later a video for the battle song "Flame of Hope" was released. Stirling would also appear as a guest performer on America's Got Talent alongside two-time champion magician Shin Lim. In September, Stirling announced she was releasing a rock version of "Rage Beneath The Mountains" from Genshin Impact for its first anniversary.

Stirling announced in October 2021 that she had collaborated with long-term instrument partner Yamaha to produce a limited edition "Crystallize" violin. The instrument is made from a variety of fine woods including maple, spruce, and brazilwood. The violin was limited to 100 units and as a package with Stirling branded instrument, bow, rosin and case was priced at $2,495. In the same month, a collaboration between Stirling and cosmetic company Bellapierre was announced. Intentional Beauty by Lindsey Stirling was launched, with the first product a citrine beauty palette. Stirling's music was featured as part of Disney's Walt Disney World Resort 50th anniversary celebration in the 'Harmonious' show at EPCOT, a night-time event that began in October.

In November, Stirling embarked on The Lindsey Stirling Christmas Program Tour, a 22-date North American concert series. This was her fourth holiday-themed tour. Later that month, on November 28, "Lindsey Stirling: Home for the Holidays" was released in movie theaters. A mix of Christmas songs and other popular tracks by Stirling were recorded and filmed with unique choreography specifically for this release. In the same month, a special song Lords was released in conjunction with the mobile video game Lords Mobile. Stirling had been on the original line-up for Electric Forest in 2022, however her name was later absent from their announcement, alongside other notable absentees including Flume and Diplo.

=== 2022–2023: Snow Waltz ===
Stirling performing at St John's Church, Kingston in November 2022

On August 25, Stirling announced her new holiday-themed album named Snow Waltz. Alongside the announcement, the first track "Ice Storm" was released as a music video on YouTube. The album was recorded in Los Angeles, produced by Gladius and will release digitally in October, and on vinyl in November. In September, Stirling announced a North American tour to coincide with the release of Snow Waltz during November and December 2022. Hallmark announced in September that Stirling would be making a cameo appearance in their movie, A Fabled Holiday starring Brooke D'Orsay and Ryan Paevey, performing Joy to the World from Snow Waltz. Stirling was recruited to perform for A Plague Tale: Requiem as part of the pre-launch activities by the video games manufacturer. Stirling is featured in a music video interlaced with gameplay. In November, Stirling made a return to The Kelly Clarkson Show, performing "Joy to the World". House of Solo magazine interviewed Stirling about her album and UK tour dates from Snow Waltz in December 2022.

In 2023, Stirling was announced as a performer at Lollapalooza Paris. Later, Stirling revealed a US Tour in conjunction with Walk Off The Earth. The tour includes a number of state fair dates including Iowa, Wisconsin, and Ohio. In July, Stirling released her version of Kashmir, originally by Led Zeppelin. Through the summer she would perform concerts in Europe including in Athens and Tel Aviv. In November, Stirling began her 2023 Snow Waltz Christmas Tour in Stateline, Nevada at the Tahoe Blue Event Center. Stirling confirmed in August she would be performing European dates on the tour in London, Paris, Brussels, and Berlin. In mid-December, Stirling performed at the CMA Christmas special alongside Amy Grant and Trisha Yearwood.

In 2023, Stirling collaborated with Japanese rock star Yoshiki to perform an instrumental version of "Forever Love" in the documentary film Yoshiki: Under the Sky.

=== 2024–present: Duality ===
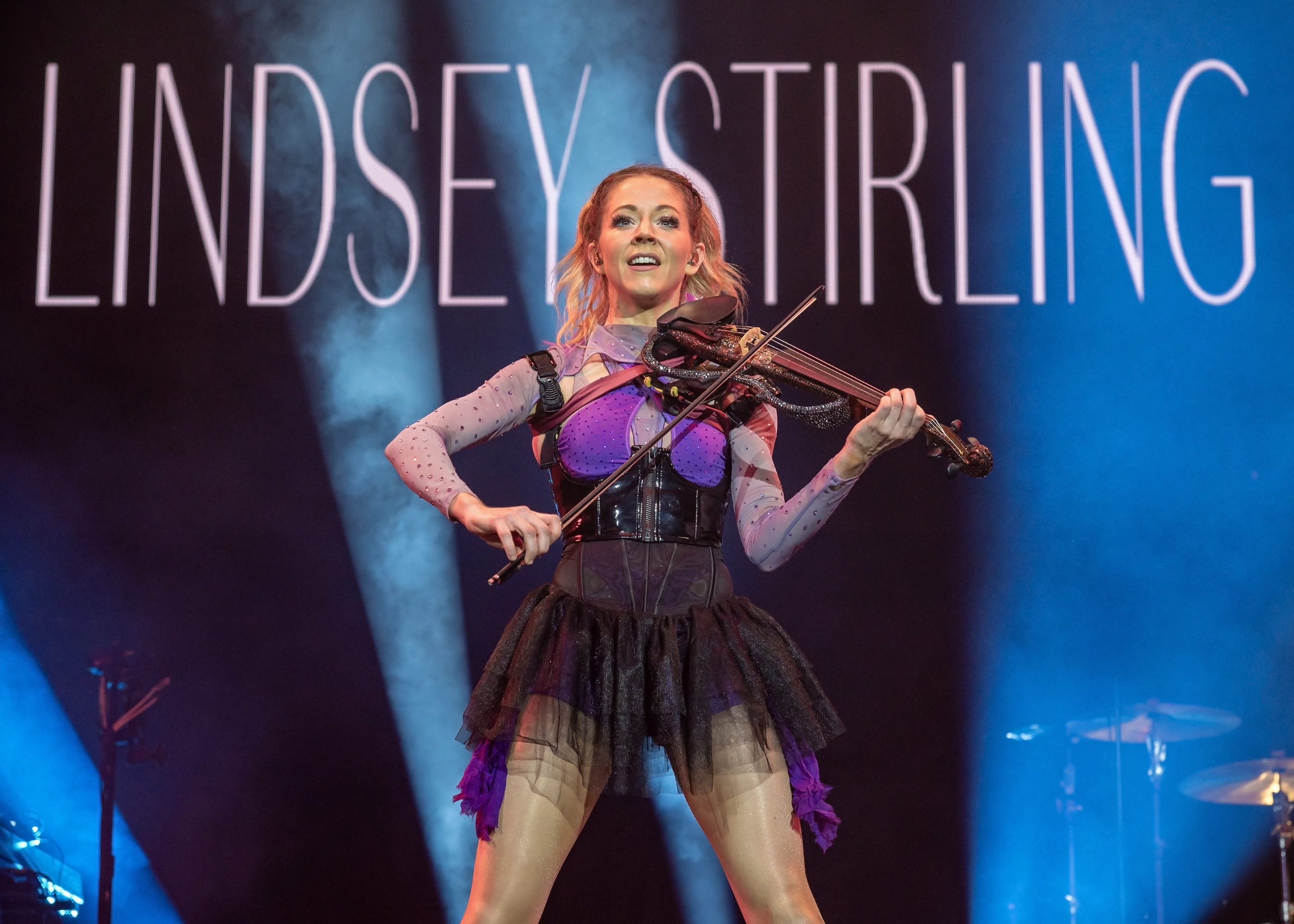
Stirling performing at the 2024 NAMM Show

In early 2024, Stirling was a performer at the 2024 NAMM show for Yamaha. Stirling was honored at the event with a She Rocks award. On 8 March 2024, Stirling announced her latest album Duality that will release on June 16. Produced by Mako, the album led with its first single Eye Of The Untold Her released on the same day. Stirling confirmed in March she would complete a 40 city tour in the US starting at the San Diego Civic Theatre on July 12, ending at Yaamava Theater on September 11. In April, she released the song Inner Gold performed with Royal & The Serpent, her second single from Duality.

Duality officially released on June 14. Stirling also released the song Survive on the same day with a new music video. In an interview with People Magazine she revealed the song was written about her unnamed boyfriend who had been cheating on her. Shortly after the release of Duality, Stirling announced her partnership with Sixthman to headline a music and entertainment cruise in May 2025 aboard the ship Norwegian Gem, which will take guests from Miami to Nassau. After the first week of release, Duality reached number 25 in the OCC UK Albums Sales chart.

At the 2024 Summer Olympic Games, American athlete Suni Lee performed to Stirling's song Eye of the Untold Her during her floor routine. In September, Stirling confirmed she would reprise her winter tour, starting in Toronto at Meridian Hall and continuing for 21 dates in the lead up to Christmas.

In 2026, Stirling collaborated with Bandai Namco Entertainment to perform a rendition of "Hortus Regis Alti", a song from the video game Ace Combat 8: Wings of Theve, in a music video promoting the game's release in October.

== Philanthropy ==
On October 1, 2013, Stirling teamed with the non-profit Atlanta Music Project to help spread appreciation of music to children who might not otherwise have the chance. The Atlanta Music Project's mission was "to inspire social change by providing Atlanta's under-served youth the opportunity to learn and perform music in orchestras and choirs". For this, Stirling made available two limited-edition Lindsey Stirling/The Power of Music shirts. The money collected from the sale of those shirts went directly to the Atlanta Music Project with the combined goal of raising enough to provide music training for 50 children.

On March 22, 2014, Stirling joined Cirque du Soleil for the second annual One Night for One Drop in Las Vegas. The non-profit organization presented the show in the Mandalay Bay Resort and Casino in celebration of World Water Day, a day which encourages people to conserve water resources in an effort to make clean water accessible to all.

During her 2017 Warmer in the Winter tour, VIP guests were encouraged to bring an unopened toy to donate to Toys for Tots. Donors received an exclusive photo laminate of Stirling and pet chihuahua Luna Latte.

On December 15, 2018, as part of Ronald McDonald House Charities of Western New York's concert series, Stirling performed at Shea's Buffalo Theatre. All proceeds from the show went to Buffalo Ronald McDonald House and the Family Lounge & Happy Wheel Cart at John R. Oishei Children's Hospital.

In April 2020, Stirling launched The Upside Fund a non-profit charity to support individuals struggling throughout the COVID-19 pandemic. In a July interview, it was revealed she had donated hundreds of thousands of dollars, and was broadening the scope of the charity to include anyone struggling economically at the time. Later that month, a partnership was forged with Tea North a Canadian company who would donate 100% of their online profits for a month to The Upside Fund. On August 27, 2020, Stirling announced she would be auctioning off a number of her performance outfits on eBay with all revenue donated to the charity. Stirling repeated this in May 2021 with auction lots including her Roundtable Rival music video outfit. For the 2021 festive season, Stirling partnered with Resolve Partners to drive donations through The Upside Fund to help those in need of financial support for medical bills. In November 2021, Stirling partnered with Fandiem to run an online giveaway where fans could donate and win a Yamaha Crystallize limited edition violin and a virtual lesson with her. In February 2022, Stirling ran another outfit auction to support The Upside Fund on eBay.

On May 8, 2020, Stirling participated at the 320 Festival, a mental health awareness event created by Talinda Bennington and Kevin Lyman. Due to the quarantine restrictions of COVID-19, the performance was live-streamed from her sister's farm in Missouri. All net proceeds from the event were donated to its nonprofit partners.

In March 2022, Stirling announced she was running an auction to support UNICEF in Ukraine following the Russian invasion. Lots included video and tour outfits, along with her violin used as a teenager. The items collectively sold for over $16,000.

== Instruments ==
Stirling uses a variety of violins depending on her performance. For live performances, she mostly uses Yamaha SV-250 Silent Violin Pro and Luis and Clark "Nero" carbon fiber acoustic violin. Stirling has been using the Yamaha electric violin since 2000, and the Luis and Clark violin became famous after she used it for her cover version of "Radioactive" with Pentatonix in 2013. For studio recording, Stirling uses an early-1900s Ernst Heinrich Roth "Roth" acoustic violin most of the time and her Yamaha Silent violin for an extremely clean sound. Before using the "Nero", Stirling used her "Roth" during live performances. However, she stopped using the "Roth" live because she was sweating so much during the show. Stirling also owns three other violins: a $40 eBay violin "Ingrid", a purple Wood Viper violin "Viper" and a Yamaha Silent violin "Steampunk". "Steampunk" was her first electric violin, and "Ingrid" is used for dangerous stunts in her music videos.

In an interview in August 2016 with Strings Magazine, Stirling stated that Yamaha electric violins are her "weapon of choice" while the "Roth" she calls Excalibur is her favorite. In 2020, Stirling joined Reverb to talk through her five favorite violins including David Bowie, her crossbow violin. In a 2022 video uploaded to TikTok, Stirling showed fans all of her violins.

Other violins include:

- Cleopatra – An electric with a gem-encrusted body. Featured when performing "Master of Tides"
- Anastasia – A gift from Russian fans. Red body with fauna decorations on the front body.
- Pickles – A child's violin used for concert interludes.
- Violumpet – A converted stunt violin with horn attachment; featured in "Roundtable Rival".
- Ace – An alternative acoustic violin
- David Bowie – An electric with a crossbow attachment; featured in "Artemis"
- Arowen – An electric with a silver gem-encrusted body.
- Starlight – An electric with an LED light strip.
- Spoon – An electric Yamaha YEV104 Series in a natural wood finish.
- Crystallize – A signature Lindsey Stirling Yamaha electric.
- Pickles – a miniature violin, used during her "Snow Waltz Tour"

Stirling uses the L.R. Baggs violin pickup for her "Roth" and "Nero". In March 2022, Stirling auctioned off a violin she used as a teenager for the charity Unicef. The violin sold for $7,200.

== Personal life ==
Stirling attended Brigham Young University (BYU) in Provo, Utah, to study filmmaking. She later served as a missionary in New York City for the Church of Jesus Christ of Latter-day Saints (LDS Church). A story she wrote about her mission was later published in the compilation Do Not Attempt in Heels: Mission Stories and Advice from Sisters Who've Been There. Stirling returned to Provo in 2009 to continue studying at BYU. She then moved back to Arizona, in December 2012, to be with her family. In August 2015, she graduated from the BYU Marriott School of Management with a Bachelor of Science degree in recreation management. At this time, Forbes estimated her net worth as $6 million.

In 2024, Stirling hired a private investigator to track a stalker who had previously attempted to illegally enter a property owned by Taylor Swift.

For a short time she dated filmmaker Devin Graham, who had attended the same university and church. The two began dating shortly after the filming of "Crystallize" and Graham moved to Utah. The two have since ended their professional and personal relationship. In October 2017, on Dancing with the Stars Stirling revealed her year and a half relationship with Ryan Weed ended. In mid-2024, Stirling revealed on her social media that she been in a relationship for several years with an unnamed man, but had ended the relationship the previous fall.

Stirling has publicly spoken about her battle with anorexia. She discovered her disorder while working for a treatment center for troubled girls. Stirling said in an interview with Good Morning America that her song "Shatter Me" was "actually my story of overcoming my eating disorder". The cover art of the album is a reference to her struggle which showcases a "seemingly perfect-looking ballerina standing in the middle of a cracked glass globe". In 2013, Stirling was featured by the LDS Church in its I'm a Mormon campaign in which she spoke openly about how her faith helped in her battle during high school and college. On November 25, 2014, she performed and answered questions in a live world broadcast to LDS youth. A one-hour video recording of the event was featured on the LDS Church home page.

Stirling is a teetotaler, and during tours, she has a ban on her team consuming alcohol on her tour bus.

Stirling has a celestial body named after her, Asteroid 242516 Lindseystirling, about 2–3 km diameter, semi-major axis of 2.72AU, eccentricity of 0.051, inclined 3.7 degrees to ecliptic.

== Touring band members ==
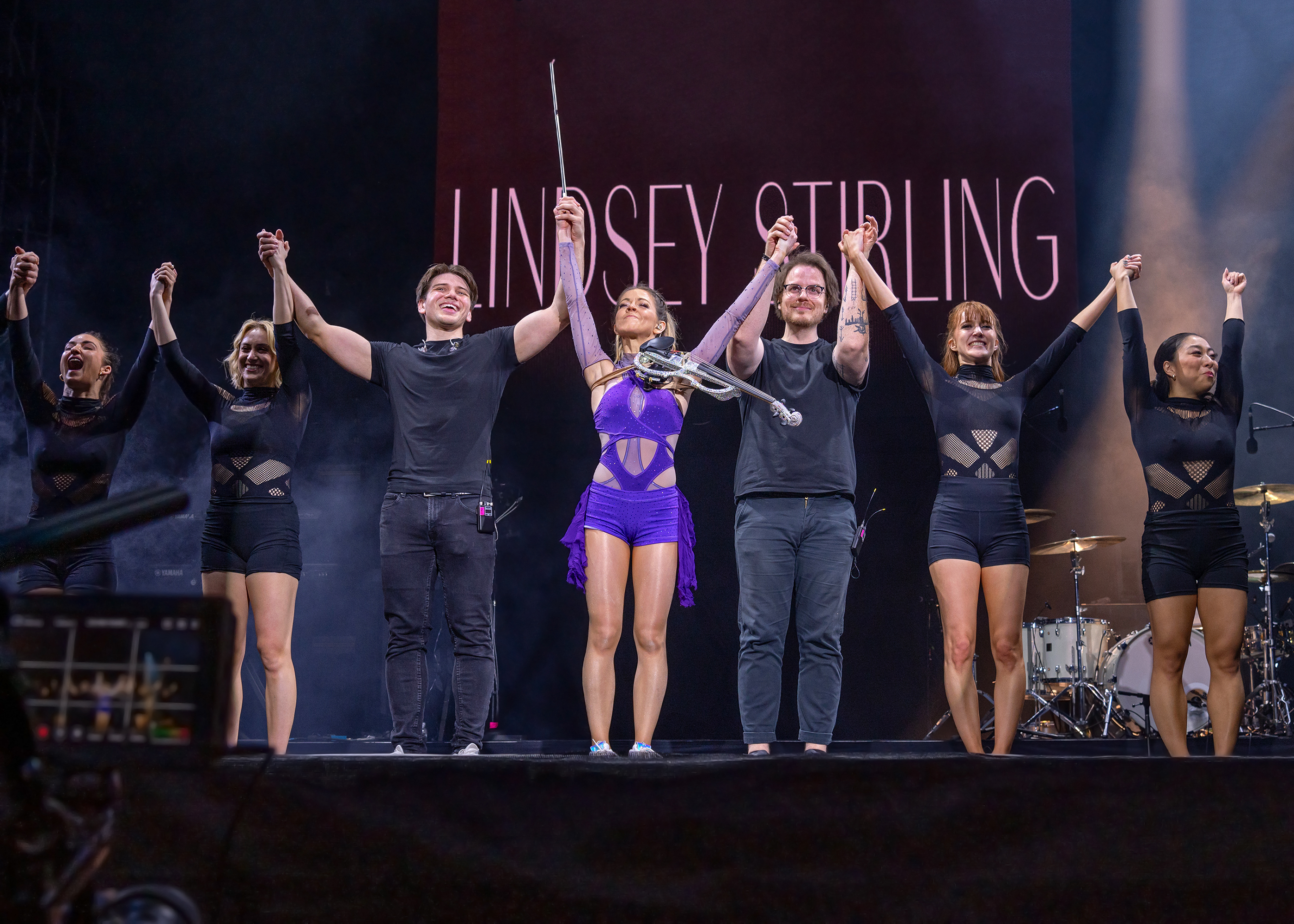
Stirling (center), Riveros (left) and Steen (right) in 2024

- Drew Steen – drums, percussion (2012–present)
- Ryan Riveros - keyboards, guitars (2021–present)

Dancers (2024)

- Selena Hamilton
- Taylor Gagliano
- Anika Kojma
- Madeline Underwood
- Annelise Ritacca

Former

- Jason "Gavi" Gaviati – keyboards, samples (2012–2015); Gaviati died on November 21, 2015.
- Kit Nolan – keyboards, guitars and samples (2015–2021)

== Discography ==
- Lindsey Stirling (2012)
- Shatter Me (2014)
- Brave Enough (2016)
- Warmer in the Winter (2017)
- Artemis (2019)
- Snow Waltz (2022)
- Duality (2024)

== Filmography ==
Year	Title	Role	Notes
2010	America's Got Talent	Herself/contestant	Season 5
2015	Breaking Through	Phelba	
2016	Sing It!	Guest Judge	Episode 5
2016	Convos with My 2 Year Old	Lindsey	Season 7, episodes 12 & 13
2016	A Trip to Unicorn Island	Herself	
2017	Lindsey Stirling: Brave Enough	Herself	Documentary
2017	Dancing with the Stars	Herself	Runner-up in season 25
2018	The Outpost	Pock	Episode: "The Book of Names"
2018	America's Got Talent	Herself	Guest Performer on season 13 Finale
2020	S.A.L.E.M	Luna (voice)	Pilot
2021	Paltrocast with Darren Paltrowitz	Herself	Season 4, episode 14
2022	A Fabled Holiday	Herself	Hallmark Television Movie

== Bibliography ==
=== Books ===
Title	Year	Publisher	ISBN	Notes
The Only Pirate at the Party	2017	Gallery Books, New York City, New York	978-1-5011-1917-0	Published in Germany under the title "Ich war der einzige Pirat auf der Party"

=== Music publications ===
Stirling has authored and published a number of books of music she has either performed or arranged for violin and piano. In addition, she also sells sheet music from her own online store.

Title	Publication date	Publisher	ISBN
Lindsey Stirling - Violin Play-Along Volume 35	December 2013	Hal Leonard	9781476871257
Lindsey Stirling Hits Violin Play-Along Vol. 45	December 2014	Hal Leonard	9781480360662
Lindsey Stirling Favorites: Violin Play-Along Volume 64	December 2016	Hal Leonard	9781495062872
Hallelujah: Arranged by Lindsey Stirling for Violin and Piano	December 2017	Hal Leonard	9781540006929
Les Misérables Medley for Violin and Piano: As Performed by Lindsey Stirling	December 2017	Hal Leonard	9781540012173
The Greatest Showman: Medley for Violin & Piano: Arranged by Lindsey Stirling	December 2018	Hal Leonard	9781540027566
The Greatest Showman: Medley for Violin: Arranged by Lindsey Stirling	December 2018	Hal Leonard	9781540027559
Lindsey Stirling - Piano Collection	December 2019	Hal Leonard	9781540041135
Lindsey Stirling - Piano Collection: Intermediate Piano Solos	December 2019	Hal Leonard	9781540041142
Lindsey Stirling - Christmas Collection: Violin Play-Along Volume 81	December 2020	Hal Leonard	9781540059000
Lindsey Stirling - Snow Waltz: Violin Play-Along	November 2023	Hal Leonard	9781705199701

=== Comics ===
Lindsey Stirling released a series of comic books to pair with her album, Artemis.

Title	Publication date	Publisher
Artemis Preview Edition	September 2019	Golden Apple Comics
Artemis No. 1	November 2019	Lindseystomp Productions
Artemis No. 2	June 2020	Lindseystomp Productions
Artemis No. 3	October 2020	Lindseystomp Productions
Artemis No. 4	May 2021	Lindseystomp Productions
Artemis No. 5	June 2021	Lindseystomp Productions
Artemis No. 6	July 2021	Lindseystomp Productions
Artemis The Collected Edition	September 2021	Lindseystomp Productions

== Tours ==
=== 2012–2013 Tour ===
Stirling's first tour lasted almost a year with 122 dates around North America, Europe, Asia, and Australia. The Lindsey Stirling Tour began three days before the CD release of her first album, Lindsey Stirling. Her tour began in 2012 with dates in North America within the United States and Canada. At the beginning of 2013, Stirling continued her tour in Europe as a "test tour". Her official European leg kicked off in Russia on May 22, 2013. In August 2013, she continued her tour, adding dates around Asia and Australia. Finishing her tour, Stirling added a last date in the UK on September 4, 2013. The shows were a success in that 46 dates were sold out, and on Ticketmaster.com the audience gave a rating to the tour of 4.7 out of 5 stars.

=== 2014–2015 Tour ===
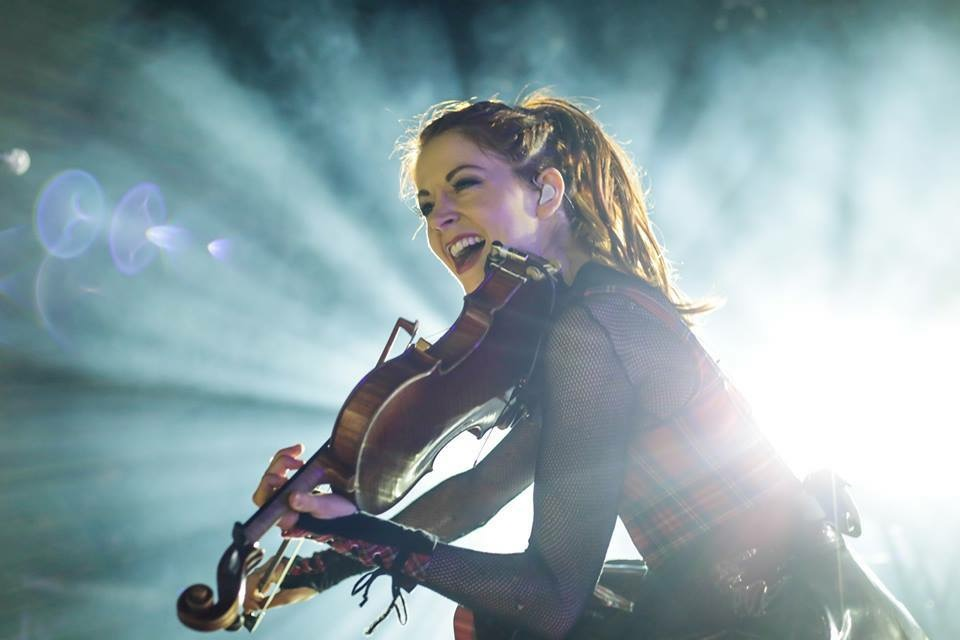
Lindsey Stirling in Guadalajara, Mexico, in April 2015

In 2014 and 2015, Stirling played the Shatter Me World Tour and The Music Box Tour. The 2014 North and European American leg of Lindsey Stirling's tour consisted of her performing 77 shows over a five-month time span. For 2015, Stirling did 67 shows over five continents. Stirling toured around North America, Europe, Asia, Oceania, and South America, being her first time presenting a show on this continent. In December 2014, it was confirmed that more than 200,000 people had attended Stirling's shows, more than half of them being from the European continent.

=== Lindsey Stirling Summer Tour (2016) ===
After taking nine months off to record a new album, Brave Enough, which was released on August 19, 2016, Stirling returned to touring. An April 2016 announcement confirmed her Summer Tour which would encompass individual concerts and festivals across the United States of America. The announcement occurred shortly after her surprise appearance at Coachella.

=== European summer festivals (2016) ===
Following completion of her summer tour, Stirling played at four summer festivals in September 2016. She began at Electric Picnic in Ireland on September 3, before travelling to Festival du Chant Gros in Switzerland and performing on September 7. Stirling would then play Fête de l'Humanité on September 9 and Lollapalooza Germany in Berlin on September 10 before returning to start her 2016/17 Brave Enough Tour a few weeks later.

=== Brave Enough Tour (2016–2017) ===
Following her Summer 2016 Tour, Stirling started her 79-date world tour that would span four continents through 2016 and 2017. The tour began in San Diego, California in 2016 and ended in Guadalajara in August 2017.

=== Warmer in the Winter Tour (2017) ===
Stirling's first Christmas tour. Lindsey Stirling announced her 2017 Warmer in the Winter Tour, slated to kick off in the fall on November 8 in Albany, New York, at Palace Theatre. It concluded in Phoenix, Arizona, at Comerica Theatre on December 23. Stirling broadcast the concert live on Twitter on November 28.

=== Synthesis Live (2018) ===
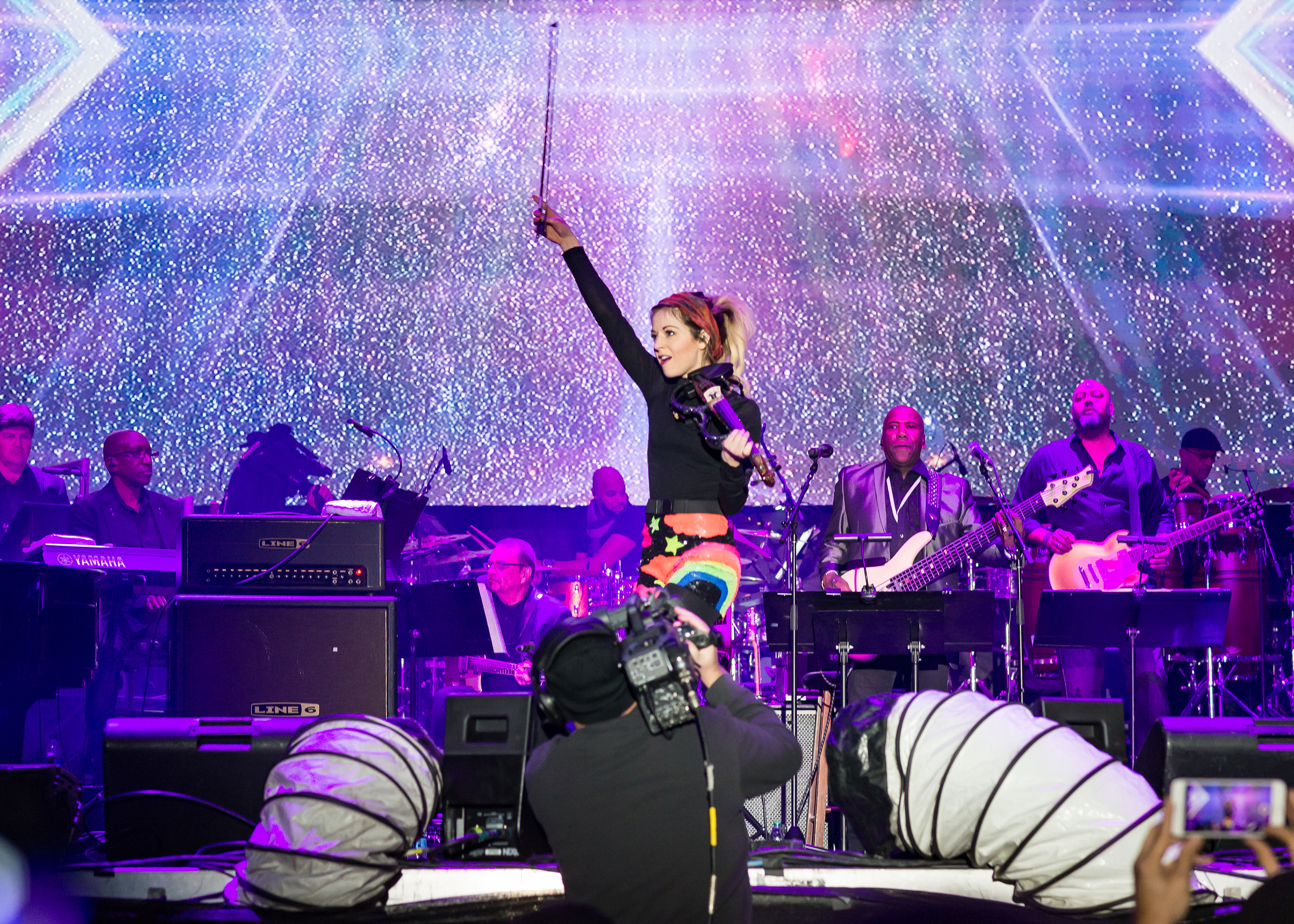
Stirling performing in 2018

Stirling and Evanescence announced they would be co-headlining together for the second leg of Evanescence's Synthesis Tour. They were also accompanied by a full orchestra.

=== The Wanderland Tour (2018) ===
On September 4, 2018, Stirling announced the 2018 Christmas-themed Wanderland Tour was slated to kick off in the fall on November 23 in Reno, Nevada. The tour concluded on December 22 in North Charleston, South Carolina.

=== Artemis Tour (2019–2022) ===
Stirling announced her Artemis World Tour in 2019 to support her latest album. The tour began in Mexico in 2019, before moving into Europe. The tour was scheduled to continue in 2020 through South America, Australia and later North America however these concerts were postponed due to COVID-19 restrictions. The North American tour was rescheduled and began in 2021.

=== Warmer in the Winter Tour (2019) ===
On September 18, 2019, Stirling announced the continuation of her Christmas-themed tour from previous years. The tour was slated to commence on November 19 in Fresno, California, at the Warnors Center for the Performing Arts and conclude on December 23 in Fort Myers, Florida, at the Barbara B. Mann Performing Arts Hall.

=== The Lindsey Stirling Christmas Program Tour (2021) ===
In October 2021, Stirling announced a U.S.-based Christmas tour. The tour ran across 22 dates. The tour began in Memphis, Tennessee, on November 26 and concluded on December 22 in Mobile, Alabama.

=== Snow Waltz Tour (2022) ===
In September 2022, Stirling announced via social media that she would be embarking on her fourth Christmas themed tour. The Snow Waltz Tour would take place during November and December 2022 across a number of dates in the United States, beginning in Grand Prairie, Texas, and concluding in Los Angeles, California. The tour is in support of her second festive album, Snow Waltz.

=== US tour (2023) ===
In early 2023, Stirling announced a US tour alongside Canadian band Walk off the Earth. The tour began in Bridgeport, Connecticut, on August 1 and concluded in Bend, Oregon, on September 2.

=== Snow Waltz Tour II (2023) ===
Stirling reprised her Christmas tour once again for 2023. It began in Stateline, Nevada, on November 16, and was scheduled to run until December 31 with the final performance in Chicago. The tour was scheduled to visit five European destinations including London, Paris, and Berlin.

=== Duality Tour (2024) ===
Stirling completed a 40 city North American tour starting on July 12 in at San Diego Civic Theatre. Bands Walk Off The Earth and Saint Motel supported Stirling at select dates.

=== Snow Waltz Tour III (2024) ===
In September 2024, Stirling confirmed she would undertake a Christmas-themed tour with 21 shows. It began in Toronto at Meridian Hall.

== Awards and nominations ==
Year	Association	Category	Nominee/Work	Result	Ref.
2014	Billboard Music Awards	Top Dance/Electronic Album	Lindsey Stirling	Nominated	
2015	Billboard Music Awards	Top Dance/Electronic Artist	Lindsey Stirling	Nominated	
2015	Billboard Music Awards	Top Dance/Electronic Album	Shatter Me	Won	
2017	Billboard Music Awards	Top Dance/Electronic Artist	Lindsey Stirling	Nominated	
2017	Billboard Music Awards	Top Dance/Electronic Album	Brave Enough	Won	
2014	German Echo Music Awards	Newcomer International	Lindsey Stirling	Nominated	
2014	German Echo Music Awards	Best Crossover Act	Lindsey Stirling	Won	
2015	German Echo Music Awards	Best Crossover Act	Shatter Me	Won	
2016	Libera Awards	Video of the Year	Take Flight	Nominated	
2014	Teen Choice Awards	Choice Web Star: Music	Shatter Me	Nominated	
2015	Teen Choice Awards	Choice Web Star: Music	Shatter Me	Nominated	
2013	Streamy Awards	Best Choreography	Lindsey Stirling	Won	
2014	Streamy Awards	Best Musical Artist	Lindsey Stirling	Won	
2015	Streamy Awards	Best Collaboration	Pentatonix and Lindsey Stirling	Nominated	
2015	Streamy Awards	Best Original Song	"Take Flight"	Nominated	
2016	Streamy Awards	Best Cover Song	"Hallelujah" by Leonard Cohen	Won	
2013	YouTube Awards	Response of the Year	"Radioactive" (with Pentatonix)	Won	
2015	YouTube Awards	Artist of the Year	Lindsey Stirling	Won	
2016	Shorty Awards	Best YouTube Musician	Lindsey Stirling	Won	
2019	Daytime Emmy Awards	Outstanding Musical Performance in a Daytime Program	Lindsey Stirling	Nominated	
2027	Grammy Awards	Best Instrumental Composition	"King of Coins"	Pending	

== See also ==
- List of female violinists
- List of electric violinists

Awards and achievements
Preceded by David Ross & Lindsay Arnold	Dancing with the Stars (US) runner up Season 25 (Fall 2016 with Mark Ballas)	Succeeded by Josh Norman & Sharna Burgess
