= Hold My Heart (song) =

Single by Lindsey Stirling featuring ZZ Ward

from the album Brave Enough
- Released: 19 August 2016 (album); 16 November 2016 (single)
- Genre: Dubstep; classical crossover; electro house; EDM
- Length: 3:50
- Label: Lindseystomp Records
- Songwriters: Lindsey Stirling, ZZ Ward, Andrew Goldstein, E. Kidd Bogart
- Producer: Andrew Goldstein

Lindsey Stirling singles chronology
"Prism" (2016)	"Hold My Heart" (2016)	"Love's Just a Feeling" (2017)

"Hold My Heart" is a 2016 single released by American violinist Lindsey Stirling featuring American blues singer ZZ Ward. It was released as the fourth single from Brave Enough on November 16, 2016.

== Background ==
"Hold My Heart" is the fourth single released from Stirling's album Brave Enough. The track features vocals by ZZ Ward. Stirling confirmed in an interview the basis for the lyrics she wrote with Ward:

"I came into the session saying, 'I don't want a man to hold my hand. I just want one to hold my heart. That's the tagline of the song. I knew the feeling for the music and ZZ and I wrote the lyrics together."

As part of the official album booklet Stirling wrote:

"All the strength and independence in the world will never fill the void of love"

"Hold My Heart" featured regularly on Stirling's tours during 2016-2018. Following Brave Enough reaching number one on the Billboard Classical Albums chart, Stirling and Ward were invited to perform the song at the Americana Lounge in Hollywood for the Grammy Awards in 2017.

== Music video ==
There were two music videos released for "Hold My Heart".

=== Official video ===
The video was released on 16 November 2016 in line with the single release date. The video was based on the story of Alice in Wonderland and featured Stirling as the White Rabbit and ZZ Ward as the Queen of Hearts. Alice became Alex for the video, which was directed by Sherif Higazy.

=== Phelba edition ===
A second video for "Hold My Heart" was released in March 2017. Stirling played an exaggerated version of herself, and also played her superfan — Phelba — made famous by Stirling on her own YouTube channel. ZZ Ward returned for this video, alongside guest appearances from Lilly Singh, Rosanna Pansino, iJustine and Cassey Ho. The video was produced as part of a collaboration with HP for their Sprocket campaign. The video was directed by Alissa Torvinen.

== Charts ==
"Hold My Heart" reached number 15 on the Billboard Dance/Electronic Streaming Songs chart.

Chart (2017)	Peak position
US Dance/Electronic Streaming Songs (Billboard)	15
