= Lindsey Stirling Artemis Tour =

2019–22 concert tour by Lindsey Stirling

Artemis Tour
- Tour by Lindsey Stirling
- Associated album: Artemis
- Start date: August 10, 2019
- End date: February 4, 2022
- No. of shows: 39 in North America; 25 in Europe; 64 in Total

Lindsey Stirling concert chronology
- The Wanderland Tour (2018); Artemis Tour (2019–2022); Warmer in the Winter Tour (2019)

The Artemis Tour is a worldwide concert tour by violinist Lindsey Stirling in support of her fourth album Artemis.

Starting in 2019, the tour continued until 2022 due to the effects of postponements from the COVID-19 pandemic.

== Background ==
The tour originally began in 2019 with Mexico and Europe the first legs of the tour. The first three concerts in Mexico were held at Mexico City, Guadalajara and Monterrey in August. In September, Stirling was in Europe for 25 concerts starting in Germany and ending in the United Kingdom.

For 2020, the Artemis Tour was due to begin in South America in March and then moving on to Australia in May. However, these dates were cancelled. The 2020 North American tour was also postponed. On August 20, 2020 Stirling performed a virtual concert under the title "Artemis Tour The Reprise" in association with Wave. The event was streamed live across Twitch, YouTube and Facebook live, as a benefit for St Jude's Children's Hospital. Stirling was turned into a digital avatar for the performance. The event raised over $55,000 for the hospital.

In May 2021, Stirling announced a rescheduled 35-date North American concert tour series with special guests Kiesza and Mako. The tour began in Kansas City in July and ended in September at Summerfest in Milwaukee.

Rescheduled dates for the Australian tour leg, and also dates for Russia, Belarus and Ukraine. However, these were later cancelled.

Stirling performed a one-off Artemis series concert for the opening of Bell Bank Park in Arizona in February 2022.

== Set list ==
The following set list is representative of the show in San Diego, California, on August 31, 2021. It is not representative of all concerts for the duration of the tour.

1. "Artemis"
2. "Til the Light Goes Out"
3. "Darkside"
4. "Shatter Me"
5. "Masquerade"
6. "Master of Tides"
7. "Love Goes On and On"
8. "Crystallize"
9. "Married Life / Once Upon a Dream / A Dream Is a Wish Your Heart Makes / You’ve Got a Friend in Me"
10. "Between Twilight"
11. "Sleepwalking"
12. "The Arena/Underground"
13. "Roundtable Rival/Don't Let This Feeling Fade"
14. "First Light"
15. "Mirage"

Encore

16. "Guardian/Lose You Now"

== Tour dates ==
Date	City	Country	Venue
North America
August 10, 2019	Mexico City	Mexico	Palacio de los Deportes
August 12, 2019	Guadalajara	Mexico	Teatro Diana
August 14, 2019	Monterey	Mexico	Auditorio CitiBanamex
Europe
September 12, 2019	Frankfurt	Germany	Jahrhunderthalle
September 13, 2019	Munich	Germany	Zenith
September 14, 2019	Milan	Italy	Alcatraz
September 16, 2019	Vienna	Austria	Gasometer
September 17, 2019	Leipzig	Germany	Haus Auensee
September 18, 2019	Kraków	Poland	Tauron Arena
September 19, 2019	Warsaw	Poland	Towar
September 20, 2019	Berlin	Germany	Columbiahalle
September 21, 2019	Strasbourg	France	Zenith
September 23, 2019	Copenhagen	Denmark	Falconer Hall
September 24, 2019	Hamburg	Germany	Barclaycard Arena
September 25, 2019	Aarhus	Denmark	Musikhuset Aarhus
September 26, 2019	Brussels	Belgium	Cirque Royal
September 27, 2019	Cologne	Germany	Palladium
September 28, 2019	Paris	France	La Seine Musicale
October 1, 2019	Floriac	France	Bordeaux Metropole Arena
October 2, 2019	Lyon	France	Halle Tony Garnier
October 4, 2019	Nantes	France	Zenith de Nantes Metropole
October 7, 2019	Budapest	Hungary	Budapest Arena
October 8, 2019	Prague	Czech Republic	O2 Universum
October 9, 2019	Zürich	Switzerland	Samsung Hall
October 10, 2019	Tilburg	Netherlands	013
October 11, 2019	Esch-sur-Alzette	Luxembourg	Rockhal
October 12, 2019	Brussels	Belgium	Cirque Royale
October 14, 2019	London	United Kingdom	Hammersmith Apollo
North America
July 3, 2021	Kansas City	United States	Starlight Theatre
July 5, 2021	Dubuque	United States	Five Flags Center
July 6, 2021	Omaha	United States	Baxter Arena
July 7, 2021	Morrison	United States	Red Rocks Amphitheater
July 8, 2021	Vail	United States	Gerald R. Ford Amphitheater
July 9, 2021	Grand Junction	United States	Amphitheater at Las Colonias Park
July 10, 2021	Salt Lake City	United States	USANA Amphitheater
July 23, 2021	Dallas	United States	The Pavilion at Toyota Music Factory
July 24, 2021	Houston	United States	Cynthia Woods Mitchel Pavilion
July 26, 2021	New Orleans	United States	Saenger Theater
July 27, 2021	Rogers	United States	Walmart Amphitheater
July 29, 2021	Raleigh	United States	Red Hat Amphitheater
July 31, 2021	Nashville	United States	Ascend Amphitheater
August 2, 2021	New York	United States	Beacon Theatre
August 3, 2021	Philadelphia	United States	The Met
August 6, 2021	Cincinnati	United States	PNC Pavilion
August 9, 2021	Minneapolis	United States	The Armory
August 10, 2021	Chicago	United States	Huntington Bank Pavilion at Northerly Island
August 11, 2021	Indianapolis	United States	The Amphitheater at White River State Park
August 12, 2021	Detroit	United States	Michigan Lottery Amphitheater at Freedom Hill
August 14, 2021	Cleveland	United States	Jacobs Pavilion at Nautica
August 16, 2021	Saratoga Springs	United States	Saratoga Performing Arts Center
August 17, 2021	Boston	United States	Rockland Trust Bank Pavilion
August 18, 2021	Oakdale	United States	Toyota Presents Oakdale Theater
August 19, 2021	Westbrook	United States	Maine Savings Pavilion at Rock Row
August 30, 2021	Los Angeles	United States	Microsoft Theater
August 31, 2021	San Diego	United States	San Diego Civic Theater
September 1, 2021	Phoenix	United States	Arizona Federal Theater
September 3, 2021	Concord	United States	Concord Pavilion
September 4, 2021	Reno	United States	Grand Sierra Theater
September 6, 2021	Portland	United States	Theater of the Clouds at Moda Center
September 7, 2021	Seattle	United States	WAMU Theater
September 9, 2021	Bonner	United States	KettleHouse Amphitheater
September 10, 2021	Milwaukee	United States	Summerfest
February 4, 2022	Mesa	United States	Bell Bank Park

=== Postponed and cancelled dates ===
Date	City	Country	Venue
March 12, 2020	Bogotá	Colombia	Teatro Jorge Eilecer Gaitan
March 14, 2020	Santiago	Chile	Teatro Caupolican
March 17, 2020	Lima	Peru	Centro de convenciones Maria Angola
March 19, 2020	São Paulo	Brazil	Unimed Hall
March 20, 2020	Uberlandia	Brazil	Sabiazinho Arena
March 23, 2020	Buenos Aires	Argentina	Luna Park Stadium
March 25, 2020	Montevideo	Uruguay	Auditorio Nacional del Sodre
February 24, 2022	Sydney	Australia	State Theatre
February 25, 2022	Melbourne	Australia	Plenary Theatre
March 1, 2022	Brisbane	Australia	The Fortitude Music Hall
March 3, 2022	Perth	Australia	Astor Theatre
March 12, 2022	Saint Petersburg	Russia	Yubileniey Arena
March 14, 2022	Novosibirsk	Russia	Expo Center Hall
March 16, 2022	Yekaterinburg	Russia	Congress Hall
March 17, 2022	Moscow	Russia	Crocus City Hall
March 19, 2022	Minsk	Belarus	Palace of the Republic
March 21, 2022	Kyiv	Ukraine	Palace "Ukraine"

== Personnel ==
Band

- Lindsey Stirling – violin
- Drew Steen – drums, percussion
- Kit Nolan – keyboards, guitars and samples
- Ryan Riveros – keyboards, guitars

Guest appearances

- Kiesza (North America)
- Mako (North America)
