= Brave Enough Tour =

2016–17 concert tour by Lindsey Stirling

- Tour by Lindsey Stirling
- Brave Enough Tour Poster for Stirling's Hamburg show in Germany
- Associated album: Brave Enough
- Start date: September 21, 2016
- End date: August 18, 2017
- No. of shows: 41 in North America; 26 in Europe; 5 in Oceania; 7 in South America; 79 in Total

Lindsey Stirling concert chronology
- Lindsey Stirling Summer Tour (2016); Brave Enough Tour (2016–2017); Warmer in the Winter Tour (2017)

The Brave Enough Tour was a worldwide concert tour by violinist Lindsey Stirling in support of her third album Brave Enough.

== Background ==
The tour began in North America in 2016, across 35 dates before heading to Europe for early 2017. Stirling then toured venues in Australia and New Zealand before returning to both North and South America.

The Brave Enough tour was Stirling's first world tour without Jason Gaviati, her long term keyboard player, who died in late 2015.

A documentary called Lindsey Stirling: Brave Enough was produced and filmed whilst Stirling was on tour. It was broadcast as paid streaming content on YouTube having been produced by YouTubeRed.

== Set list ==
The following set list is representative of the show in London on April 3, 2017.

1. "The Phoenix"
2. "Love's Just a Feeling"
3. "Prism"
4. "Shatter Me"
5. "Lost Girls"
6. "Elements"
7. "Mini Set (acoustic)"
8. "Something Wild"
9. "Gavi's Song"
10. "Those Days"
11. "Crystallize"
12. "Hold My Heart"
13. "The Arena"
14. "Mirage"
15. "Stars Align"

Encore

16. "Roundtable Rival / Don't Let This Feeling Fade"

== Tour dates ==
Date	City	Country	Venue
North America
September 21, 2016	San Diego	United States	Copley Symphony Hall
September 22, 2016	Oakland	United States	Fox Theater
September 24, 2016	Sacramento	United States	Bonney Field
September 27, 2016	Seattle	United States	McCaw Hall
September 28, 2016	Vancouver	Canada	Orpheum Theatre
September 30, 2016	Spokane	United States	Inb Performing Arts Center
October 1, 2016	Portland	United States	Arlene Schnitzer Concert Hall
October 3, 2016	Boise	United States	Summerfield at Memorial Stadium
October 4, 2016	Orem	United States	UCCU Center
October 5, 2016	Morrison	United States	Red Rocks Amphitheater
October 7, 2016	Kansas City	United States	Kansas City Music Hall
October 8, 2016	Memphis	United States	Orpheum Theatre
October 10, 2016	Nashville	United States	Andrew Jackson Hall
October 12, 2016	Minneapolis	United States	Northrop
October 13, 2016	Rosemont	United States	Rosemont Theatre
October 14, 2016	Milwaukee	United States	Riverside Theater
October 15, 2016	Louisville	United States	Palace Theatre
October 17, 2016	Detroit	United States	Fox Theatre
October 18, 2016	Toronto	Canada	Sony Centre for the Performing Arts
October 19, 2016	Montreal	Canada	Théâtre Saint-Denis
October 20, 2016	Boston	United States	Citi Performing Ars Center
October 21, 2016	New York	United States	Hammerstein Ballroom
October 24, 2016	Washington	United States	DAR Constitution Hall
October 26, 2016	Atlanta	United States	Cobb Energy Performing Arts Centre
October 27, 2016	Jacksonville	United States	Florida Theatre
October 28, 2016	Boca Raton	United States	Mizner Park Amphitheatre
October 29, 2016	Orlando	United States	Bob Carr Performing Arts Centre
November 1, 2016	Clearwater	United States	Ruth Eckerd Hall
November 3, 2016	New Orleans	United States	Saenger Theatre
November 4, 2016	Houston	United States	Revention Music Centre
November 5, 2016	Dallas	United States	Music Hall at Fair Park
November 7, 2016	Austin	United States	Bass Concert Hall
November 10, 2016	Los Angeles	United States	Dolby Theatre
November 11, 2016	Tucson	United States	Centennial Hall
November 12, 2016	Phoenix	United States	Comerica Theatre
Europe
February 18, 2017	Stockholm	Sweden	Vasateatern
February 20, 2017	Oslo	Norway	Sentrum Scene
February 21, 2017	Copenhagen	Denmark	DR Koncerthuset
February 24, 2017	Kraków	Poland	Tauron Arena
February 25, 2017	Poznań	Poland	MTP2
February 27, 2017	Budapest	Hungary	Budapest Sports Arena
March 1, 2017	Prague	Czech Republic	Forum Karlin
March 2, 2017	Munich	Germany	Zenith
March 6, 2017	Stuttgart	Germany	Porsche Arena
March 7, 2017	Vienna	Austria	Wiener Stadthalle
March 9, 2017	Berlin	Germany	Max Schmeling Halle
March 11, 2017	Hamburg	Germany	Sporthalle
March 13, 2017	Oberhausen	Germany	Koenig Pilsner Arena
March 14, 2017	Frankfurt	Germany	Jahrhunderthalle
March 15, 2017	Zürich	Switzerland	Hallenstadion
March 17, 2017	Tilburg	Netherlands	013
March 21, 2017	Luxembourg	Luxembourg	ROCKHAL
March 22, 2017	Antwerp	Belgium	Stadsschouwburg
March 23, 2017	Lille	France	Zenith
March 24, 2017	Lyon	France	Halle Tony Garnier
March 25, 2017	Paris	France	Zenith
March 27, 2017	Nantes	France	Zenith
March 29, 2017	Strasbourg	France	Zenith
March 31, 2017	Toulouse	France	Zenith
March 5, 2017	Dublin	Ireland	Vicar Street
April 3, 2017	London	England	Eventim Apollo
Oceania
April 12, 2017	Perth	Australia	Astor Theatre
April 14, 2017	Brisbane	Australia	The Tivoli
April 15, 2017	Sydney	Australia	Olympic Park
April 17, 2017	Melbourne	Australia	Sidney Myer Music Bowl
April 19, 2017	Auckland	New Zealand	Powerstation
North America
April 22, 2017	Honolulu	United States	The Republik
May 25, 2017	Milwaukee	United States	Riverside Theater
June 18, 2017	Lake Buena Vista	United States	House of Blues
South America
August 12, 2017	Bogotá	Colombia	Teatro Municipal Jorge Eliécer Gaitán
August 15, 2017	Montevideo	Uruguay	National Auditorium of Sodre
August 17, 2017	Buenos Aires	Argentina	Teatro Ópera
August 18, 2017	Buenos Aires	Argentina	Teatro Ópera
August 19, 2017	Buenos Aires	Argentina	Teatro Ópera
August 22, 2017	Santiago	Chile	Teatro Caupolicán
August 25, 2017	São Paulo	Brazil	Citibank Hall
August 26, 2017	Rio de Janeiro	Brazil	Km de Vantagens Hall
North America
August 29, 2017	Monterrey	Mexico	Auditorio Citibanamex
August 30, 2017	Mexico City	Mexico	Auditorio Nacional
August 31, 2017	Guadalajara	Mexico	Teatro Diana

== Personnel ==
Band

- Lindsey Stirling – violin
- Drew Steen – drums, percussion
- Kit Nolan – keyboards, guitars and samples
