= Brave Enough =

Studio album by Lindsey Stirling
- Released: August 19, 2016
- Recorded: 2016–2018
- Length: 55:21
- Label: Lindseystomp; Universal
- Producer: Rumors; Josh Abraham; Nico Stadi; AFSHeeN; Rock Mafia; Zedd; Robert DeLong; Keith Varon; Andrew Goldstein; Marty "Marø" Rod; Oligee; Gladius; Stephen Anderson; Silas; Vicetone; Nathaniel Motte

Lindsey Stirling chronology
Lindsey Stirling: Live from London (2015)	Brave Enough (2016)	Warmer in the Winter (2017)

Singles from Brave Enough
- 1. "The Arena" Released: June 28, 2016; 2. "Something Wild" Released: July 15, 2016; 3. "Prism" Released: October 14, 2016; 4. "Hold My Heart" Released: November 16, 2016; 5. "Love's Just a Feeling" Released: March 6, 2017; 6. "Lost Girls" Released: May 11, 2017; 7. "Mirage" Released: October 11, 2017; 8. "First Light" Released: June 28, 2018

Brave Enough is the third studio album by American electronic musician Lindsey Stirling, released independently on the imprint Lindseystomp Records on August 19, 2016. The album features guest vocalists Christina Perri, Carah Faye, Dan + Shay, ZZ Ward, Raja Kumari, Lecrae, Rivers Cuomo, Rooty and Andrew McMahon in the Wilderness. The album is composed of six instrumental tracks and eight tracks with featured vocalists.

== Singles ==
On June 28, 2016, "The Arena", the first single from the album was released. The music video for "The Arena" debuted the same day.

On July 15, the second single, "Something Wild" featuring Andrew McMahon was released and the music video was released on August 3.

On August 6, the third single, "Prism", which was produced by Robert DeLong, was released.

The fourth single "Hold My Heart" was released on November 16, 2016. The accompanying video costars Pretty Dudes actor Kyle Rezzarday.

On March 6, 2017, the fifth single, "Love's Just a Feeling" featuring Rooty was released, with the music video releasing the same day.

"Lost Girls" was released as the sixth single on May 11, 2017. "Mirage" as the seventh on October 11, 2017, and "First Light" as the eighth on June 28, 2018.

== Commercial reception ==
Brave Enough debuted at number 5 on the Billboard 200 chart with 49,000 album-equivalent units (including 45,000 in traditional album sales) in its first week, earning Stirling her second top 10 album. This figure marked the largest sales week for a dance/electronic album since Stirling's previous release, Shatter Me, sold 56,000 upon release in 2014. The album also debuted at No. 1 on the Top Classical Albums and Dance/Electronic Albums charts, her third consecutive chart-topper on each tally. Brave Enough won the Billboard Music Award for Top Dance/Electronic Album in 2017.

== In popular culture ==
"Something Wild" also features as the ending credits song for the Disney film Pete's Dragon.

"The Arena" and "Don't Let This Feeling Fade" (featuring Rivers Cuomo and Lecrae) were used as official theme songs of the 2017 CONCACAF Gold Cup.

The Bebe Rexha song "Small Doses" from her 2017 EP All Your Fault: Part 1 samples the violin used in "First Light", which Rexha credited Stirling for on Twitter.

== Track listing ==
Note: Stirling sent an exclusive track sung by herself titled "Firefly" to those who pre-ordered Brave Enough via PledgeMusic.

Standard edition
No.	Title	Writer(s)	Producer(s)	Length
1.	"Lost Girls"	Lindsey Stirling; Afshin Salmani	AFSHeeN	4:35
2.	"Brave Enough" (featuring Christina Perri)	Stirling; Keith Varon	Varon	4:23
3.	"The Arena"	Stirling; Peter Anthony Hanna; Taylor Bird	RUMORS	3:52
4.	"The Phoenix"	Stirling; Salmani; Tim James; Joshua Kissiah Cumbee; Antonina Armato	Josh Abraham; Oligee; Nico Stadi; Rock Mafia	4:04
5.	"Where Do We Go" (featuring Carah Faye)	Stirling; James; Carah Faye Charnow; Armato	Abraham; Stadi; Rock Mafia	4:15
6.	"Those Days" (featuring Dan + Shay)	Stirling; Hanna; Bird	RUMORS	3:50
7.	"Prism"	Stirling; Robert DeLong	DeLong	3:32
8.	"Hold My Heart" (featuring ZZ Ward)	Stirling; Zsuzsanna Eva Ward; Andrew Goldstein; E. Kidd Bogart	Goldstein	3:29
9.	"Mirage" (featuring Raja Kumari)	Stirling; Svetha Yallapragada Rao; Marty Rod	Marø	4:22
10.	"Don't Let This Feeling Fade" (featuring Rivers Cuomo and Lecrae)	Stirling; Lecrae Devaughn Moore; Hanna; Rivers Cuomo; Bird	RUMORS	3:36
11.	"First Light"	Stirling; James Wong	Gladius	3:23
12.	"Love's Just a Feeling" (featuring Rooty)	Stirling; Anton Zaslavski; Toby Gad; Autumn Rowe; Becky Hill; Nico Hartikainen	Zedd	3:49
13.	"Something Wild" (featuring Andrew McMahon)	Stirling; Andrew McMahon; Hanna; Bird	RUMORS; Abraham; Stadi	3:44
14.	"Gavi's Song"	Stirling; Jason Gaviati; Drew C. Lawrence; Stephen J. Anderson	Anderson	4:32
Total length:				55:21

Target deluxe edition
No.	Title	Writer(s)	Producer(s)	Length
15.	"Waltz"	Stirling; Mark Maxwell	SILAS	3:58
16.	"Afterglow"	Stirling; Ruben den Boer; Victor Pool	Vicetone	3:38
17.	"Powerlines"	Stirling; Nathaniel Motte	Motte	4:42
18.	"Forgotten Voyage"	Stirling; Motte	Motte	4:00
Total length:				71:34

Barnes and Noble Exclusive vinyl edition
No.	Title	Writer(s)	Length
15.	"Activate"	Stirling; Pete Nappi	3:08
Total length:			58:29

== Special vinyl editions ==
In total, four special edition copies of Brave Enough were released on vinyl.

- Red Swirl Disc Edition
- Barnes & Noble exclusive featuring the bonus track "Activate" on a white disc
- Urban Outfitters exclusive (limited to 500 copies) with an autographed postcard
- Record Store Day exclusive (limited to 650 copies) signed on gatefold

== Charts ==
=== Weekly charts ===
Chart (2016)	Peak position
Australian Albums (ARIA)	39
Austrian Albums (Ö3 Austria)	5
Belgian Albums (Ultratop Flanders)	39
Belgian Albums (Ultratop Wallonia)	36
Canadian Albums (Billboard)	7
French Albums (SNEP)	9
German Albums (Offizielle Top 100)	4
Italian Albums (FIMI)	66
New Zealand Heatseekers Albums (RMNZ)	2
Polish Albums (ZPAV)	22
Scottish Albums (OCC)	56
Swiss Albums (Schweizer Hitparade)	3
UK Albums (OCC)	100
UK Dance Albums (OCC)	4
US Billboard 200	5
US Top Classical Albums (Billboard)	1
US Top Dance Albums (Billboard)	1
US Independent Albums (Billboard)	2

=== Year end charts ===
Chart (2016)	Position
US Classical Albums (Billboard)	3
US Dance/Electronic Albums (Billboard)	2
US Independent Albums (Billboard)	15

Chart (2017)	Position
US Classical Albums (Billboard)	1
US Dance/Electronic Albums (Billboard)	19
US Independent Albums (Billboard)	38

Chart (2018)	Position
US Classical Albums (Billboard)	15

Chart (2020)	Position
US Classical Albums (Billboard)	25

== Music videos ==
List of music videos, showing year released and director
Title	Year	Director(s)	Notes
"The Arena"	2016	Austin M. Kerns	Featuring Derek Hough
"Something Wild"	2016	Unknown	Featuring collaborator Andrew McMahon; Includes footage from Pete's Dragon
"Firefly"	2016	Unknown	Includes footage from Barbie: Star Light Adventure
"Prism"	2016	Will Kindrick	Choreographed by Kyle Hanagami
"Hold My Heart"	2016	Sherif Higazy	Featuring collaborator ZZ Ward
"Love's Just a Feeling"	2017	Lindsey Stirling	Featuring Luke Valen, Brett Keating, Travis Leonard, and collaborator Rooty
"Hold My Heart" (alternate)	2017	Alissa Torvinen	Filmed as a promotional video for the HP Sprocket; Features Stirling as her recurring character "Phelba"
"Lost Girls"	2017	Unknown	Direct sequel to the "Shatter Me" music video; Stirling reprises the ballerina character from that video.
"Mirage"	2017	Lindsey Stirling	Choreographed by Kyle Hanagami and Ashley Gonzales
"First Light"	2018	Unknown	Choreographed by Ashley Gonzales
