= Warmer in the Winter =

Studio album by Lindsey Stirling
- Released: October 20, 2017
- Genre: Christmas music, classical crossover
- Length: 42:52
- Label: Lindseystomp; Concord

Lindsey Stirling chronology
Brave Enough (2016)	Warmer in the Winter (2017)	Artemis (2019)

Deluxe edition
- Deluxe edition released in 2018

Warmer in the Winter is the fourth studio album and first Christmas album by violinist and composer Lindsey Stirling, released on October 20, 2017. The album features Becky G, Trombone Shorty, Alex Gaskarth of All Time Low, and Sabrina Carpenter. The album is composed of ten Christmas cover tracks and three original tracks. The album opened at No. 32 on the Billboard 200, selling 15,000 copies, making her fourth Top 40 album. The deluxe edition, which features five bonus tracks, was released on October 19, 2018.

== Critical reception ==
AllMusic gave Warmer in the Winter three stars out of five, with reviewer James Christopher Monger writing that "Stirling has crafted a fun and flighty brew of modern holiday cheer that is most certainly of its time".

== Track listing ==
Standard edition
No.	Title	Writer(s)	Producer(s)	Length
1.	"Dance of the Sugar Plum Fairy"	Pyotr Ilyich Tchaikovsky; Traditional	Josh Abraham; NONFICTION; Oligee^{[a]}	2:39
2.	"You're a Mean One, Mr. Grinch" (featuring Sabrina Carpenter)	Albert Hague; Theodor S. Geisel	Abraham; Oligee^{[a]}; Brian Phillips^{[a]}	2:48
3.	"Christmas C'mon" (featuring Becky G)	Lindsey Stirling; Autumn Rowe; Jon Levine	Abraham; Levine	3:50
4.	"Carol of the Bells"	Mykola Leontovych; Traditional	Abraham; Oligee^{[a]}; Phillips^{[a]}	2:48
5.	"Angels We Have Heard on High"	Traditional	Abraham	4:22
6.	"I Saw Three Ships"	Traditional	Stephen J. Anderson	2:35
7.	"Let It Snow"	Jule Styne; Sammy Cahn	Abraham	2:53
8.	"Warmer in the Winter" (featuring Trombone Shorty)	Stirling; Evan Bogart; Phillips	Abraham	2:55
9.	"What Child Is This"	William Chatterton Dix; Traditional	Abraham	3:19
10.	"All I Want for Christmas"	Mariah Carey; Walter Afanasieff	Abraham	4:05
11.	"Time to Fall in Love" (featuring Alex Gaskarth)	Stirling; Jordan Witzigreuter; Cameron Alexander Walker-Wright	Witzigreuter; Rian Dawson^{[b]}	2:56
12.	"Jingle Bell Rock"	Joseph Beal; James Boothe	Abraham	3:48
13.	"Silent Night"	Franz Gruber; Joseph Mohr; Traditional	Abraham	3:54
Total length:				42:52

Target bonus tracks
No.	Title	Length
14.	"We Three Gentlemen"	2:59
15.	"O Come, Emmanuel"	3:52
Total length:		49:43

2018 deluxe edition
No.	Title	Length
14.	"I Wonder As I Wander"	4:26
15.	"We Three Gentlemen (Medley)"	2:58
16.	"Santa Baby"	3:23
17.	"Main Title From Home Alone (Somewhere In My Memory)"	3:59
18.	"Hallelujah"	3:18
Total length:		1:00:56

2018 Target Deluxe Edition
No.	Title	Length
14.	"I Wonder As I Wander"	4:26
15.	"We Three Gentlemen (Medley)"	2:58
16.	"Santa Baby"	3:23
17.	"Main Title From Home Alone (Somewhere In My Memory)"	3:59
18.	"Hallelujah"	3:18
19.	"Mary, Did You Know?"	3:33
20.	"Home For The Holidays"	2:31
Total length:		1:07:00

Notes

- ^{^[a]} signifies a co-producer
- ^{^[b]} signifies a vocal producer

== Charts ==
=== Weekly charts ===
Chart (2017)	Peak position
Austrian Albums (Ö3 Austria)	43
Belgian Albums (Ultratop Flanders)	150
Belgian Albums (Ultratop Wallonia)	75
Canadian Albums (Billboard)	90
French Albums (SNEP)	66
German Albums (Offizielle Top 100)	52
Swiss Albums (Schweizer Hitparade)	40
US Billboard 200	22
US Top Classical Albums (Billboard)	1
US Top Holiday Albums (Billboard)	1

=== Year end charts ===
Chart (2017)	Position
US Classical Albums (Billboard)	7

Chart (2018)	Position
US Classical Albums (Billboard)	2

Chart (2021)	Position
US Classical Albums (Billboard)	16

Chart (2022)	Position
US Classical Albums (Billboard)	18

Chart (2023)	Position
US Classical Albums (Billboard)	15

== Certifications ==
Region	Certification	Certified units/sales
United States (RIAA)	Gold	500,000^{‡}
^{‡} Sales+streaming figures based on certification alone.

== Music videos ==
List of music videos, showing year released and director
Title	Year	Director(s)	Notes
"Dance of the Sugar Plum Fairy"	2017	Unknown	
"Christmas C'mon"	2017	Unknown	Featuring vocalist Becky G Choreographed by Ashley Gonzales
"Carol of the Bells"	2017	Stephen Wayne Mallett	Choreographed by Ashley Gonzales
"Angels We Have Heard on High"	2017	Dream Team Directors; Bayou Bennett; Daniel Lir	Produced by Jenna Capozzi; Cross-promotion with Masterpass' relief efforts after Hurricane Maria.
"I Wonder As I Wander"	2018	Graham Fielder	Shot on location at White Horse Ranch in Landers, California. Concept by Lindsey Stirling.
"You're a Mean One, Mr. Grinch"	2018	Joshua Shultz; Lindsey Stirling	Featuring vocalist Sabrina Carpenter; Produced by Krizia Vega
"Santa Baby"	2018	Joshua Shultz; Lindsey Stirling	Produced by Krizia Vega
"Warmer in the Winter"	2018	Alissa Torvinen; Lindsey Stirling	Featuring Mark Ballas, Addie Byers, and Malece Miller; Produced by Tyler Zelinsky; Executive Producers: Kimberley Stuckwisch and Carlos Lopez Estrada
"We Three Gentlemen"	2019	Graham Fielder	Produced by Lindsey Stirling.
"Angels We Have Heard on High" (alternate video)	2020	Unknown	Cinematography by Rj Idos and Morgan Steinagel
"Carol of the Bells" (live)	2023	Navire Argo	Filmed at Lollapalooza Paris 2023; Live band: Drew Steen and Ryan Riveros; Dancers: Taylor Gagliano, Anika Kojima, Morgan Geraghty, Annelise Ritacca, Kailyn Rogers, and Selena Hamilton

== See also ==
- List of Billboard Top Holiday Albums number ones of the 2010s
