= Insomniac (promoter) =

American electronic music event promoter

- Type: Private
- Industry: Event promoter, electronic music
- Founded: 1993
- Headquarters: Beverly Hills, California, United States
- Key people: Pasquale Rotella (founder)
- Divisions: Insomniac Records, Insomniac Radio, Bassrush, Basscon, Dreamstate, Hard (music festival), Audiotistic Music Festival, Factory 93
- Subsidiaries: Club Glow
- Website: Insomniac.com

Insomniac (formerly Insomniac Events) is an American electronic music event promoter and music distributor. Founded by Pasquale Rotella, it is the organizer of various music festivals, including its flagship electronic music festival Electric Daisy Carnival (EDC) in Las Vegas.

Alongside EDC, Insomniac runs the electronic music events Beyond Wonderland and Nocturnal Wonderland, as well as drum and bass and dubstep-oriented events under the brand Bassrush, hardstyle events under the brand Basscon, and trance events under the brand Dreamstate.

Insomniac is also involved in the operation of nightclubs across major regions. The company manages three Los Angeles venues—Create (in partnership with SBE), Exchange L.A., and the underground warehouse Factory 93. In 2019, it acquired Miami's Club Space, and in 2020, Washington, D.C.'s Echostage and Soundcheck nightclubs, along with their operator Club Glow, which also oversees Project GLOW Festival and Moonrise Music Festival.

In 2014, Insomniac introduced a co-branded EDM record label known as Insomniac Records, initially in partnership with Interscope Geffen A&M. In 2018, Insomniac took its A&R and distribution operations in-house as Insomniac Music Group .

== Overview and partnerships ==
Insomniac has been described as placing a larger emphasis on fan experiences over profits and ticket sales, with Rotella having argued that music festivals did not require "big acts who sell out arenas" (going as far as to praising Burning Man for being an "event by the people for the people" where "the organizers just provide an open space" and "people go all out").

In June 2013, Insomniac announced a number of partnerships, including one with Dick Clark Productions to produce a dance music awards show, and a "creative partnership" with Live Nation that would give Insomniac access to Live Nation's resources, while leaving them creative control over their events. While specifics of the deal were not revealed, Rotella emphasized the deal was not an acquisition.

In August 2015, Rotella announced his new radio show, Night Owl Radio, on SiriusXM's Electric Area. Electric Area was later replaced by Diplo's Revolution in 2018. In the summer of 2018, Insomniac Radio launched on SiriusXM. In May 2019, Insomniac partnered with Dash Radio as its flagship station. In June 2019, Insomniac acquired a controlling stake in Soundslinger, LLC, the organizer of the Okeechobee Music & Arts Festival. The event returned from a one-year hiatus in 2020 with a revamped production, carrying artistic aspects of other Insomniac festivals. In July 2019, Insomniac acquired a majority stake in Miami's Club Space nightclub.

In response to the COVID-19 pandemic (which resulted in the postponement of all of its in-person festivals), Insomniac began to stream a rotation of sets from previous editions of its festivals on its YouTube and Twitch channels under the "Insomniac Rewind" banner, and live "virtual" festivals. In October 2020, Insomniac began a residency of drive-in "Park 'N Rave" concerts at the NOS Events Center in San Bernardino, and announced its first in-person concert event since the beginning of the pandemic—Boo! Orlando—on October 30 and 31 at Orlando's newly-opened venue The Vanguard. The event featured enhanced safety protocols, including face masks and face shields being issued to all attendees. In December 2020, Insomniac announced a "drive-through audiovisual experience" event known as the "Electric Mile" at Santa Anita Park—featuring installations separated into "worlds" inspired by its main festival brands.

In February 2021, Insomniac announced a number of new brands, including Lost in Dreams—a record label and upcoming festival focusing upon future bass and melodic dubstep, and a bass music event at The Vanguard known as Abduction.

In March 2022, Insomniac announced a partnership with Unity Technologies to develop a "persistent" online world for virtual concerts.

In April 2025, Soundslinger stated that Insomniac was no longer involved in the Okeechobee festival.

In August 2025, Insomniac launched a short-term residency at Sphere Las Vegas known as Unity, in collaboration with the Tomorrowland festival. In January 2026, Insomniac announced a second collaboration with Tomorrowland, hosting a daytime festival event based on its Core stage at Los Angeles State Historic Park. In November 2026, Insomniac and Tomorrowland announced that Core would return in 2027.

== Insomniac Music Group ==
Insomniac Records
- Founded: 2014
- Founder: Pasquale Rotella
- Status: Active
- Genre: Electronic dance music
- Country of origin: United States
- Official website: insomniacrecords.com

In May 2014, Insomniac announced the formation of Insomniac Records, an EDM record label created in partnership with Interscope Geffen A&M. The label aimed to attract both "undiscovered" and "established" producers. Arty was announced as the first artist to be signed to the label. Other artists such as Bingo Players and Chris Lake were also signed.

In December 2018, Insomniac announced the formation of Insomniac Music Group, which provides A&R and distribution services for its in-house imprints (which includes brand extensions of some of its festivals) and other electronic music labels. Alongside Insomniac Records, its imprints include:

- Basscon Records
- Bassrush Records
- Discovery Project
- Dreamstate Records
- Gud Vibrations
- HARD Recordings
- In / Rotation
- Lost in Dreams
- What To Do

== Events ==
- Apocalypse: Zombieland
- Audiotistic Music Festival
- Beyond Wonderland
- Boo Seattle
- Core (collaboration with Tomorrowland)
- Countdown New Year’s Eve
- Daytrip
- Dreamstate
- Electric Daisy Carnival (Las Vegas, Mexico, Orlando, and Portugal. UK, India, Puerto Rico, and Brazil discontinued)
- Electric Forest (collaboration with Madison House under Anschutz Entertainment Group)
- Escape Halloween (formerly Escape From Wonderland)
- Forbidden Kingdom
- Give Thanks Festival
- Hard
- EDSea
- Nocturnal Wonderland
- Project GLOW

=== Inactive ===
- Bay Nites
- Crush (Southern California, San Francisco, Phoenix, Dallas)
- Together as One
- White Wonderland
- Middlelands
- Okeechobee Music & Arts Festival
- We Are NRG
- Holy Ship!
- Project Z

== Related media ==
- Electric Daisy Carnival (2000 album)
- Electric Daisy Carnival, Vol. 1 (2010 album)
- Electric Daisy Carnival Experience (2011 film)
- "Under the Electric Sky" (2013 film)

== See also ==
- SFX Entertainment
