= Jonathon Crawford =

American professional baseball pitcher

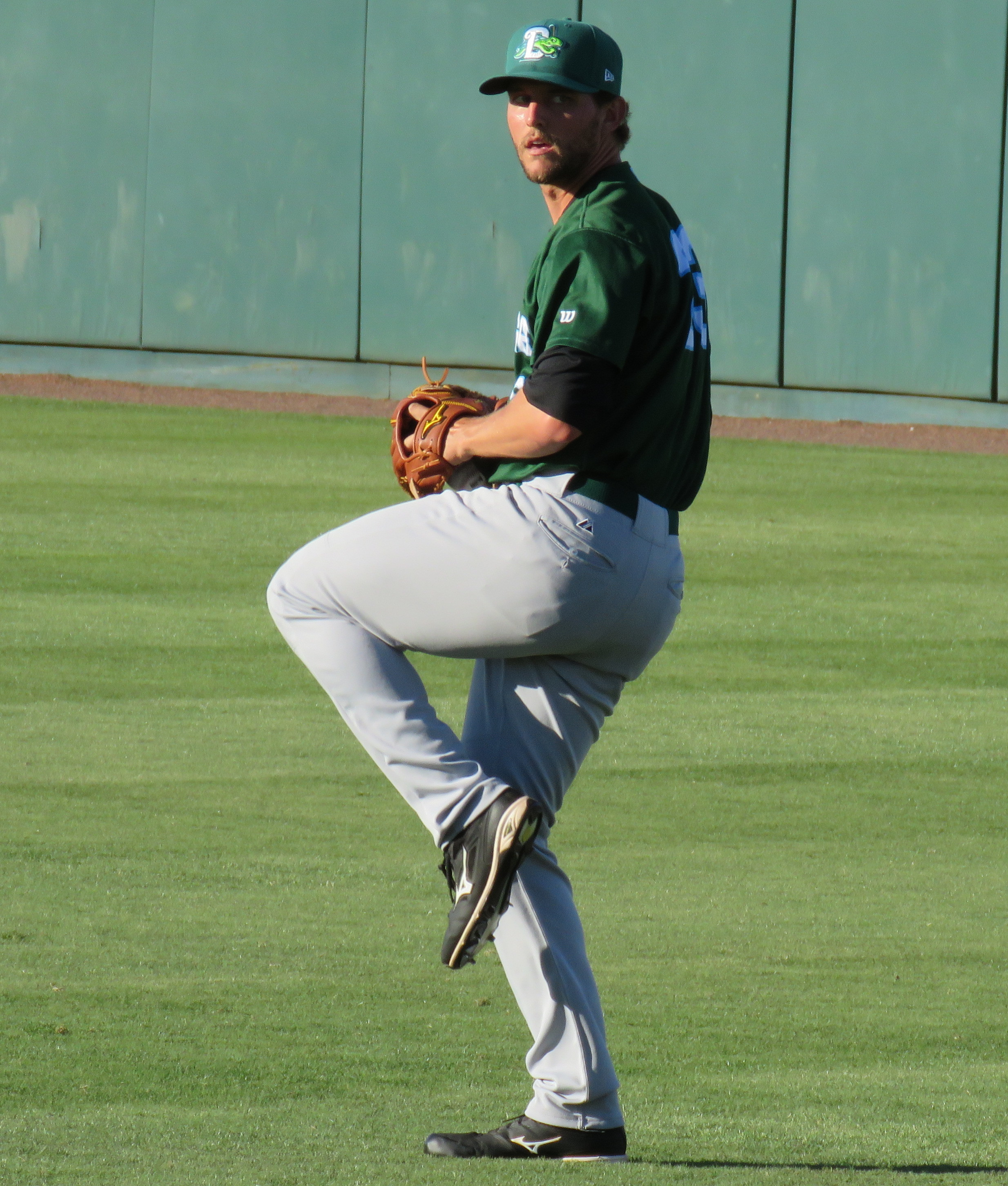
- Crawford with the Daytona Tortugas
- Pitcher
- Born: November 1, 1991 (age 34); Stuart, Florida, U.S.
- Bats: Right Throws: Right
- Stats at Baseball Reference

Jonathon Neal Crawford (born November 1, 1991) is an American former professional baseball pitcher. He was a first round draft pick in 2013, but he never played in Major League Baseball (MLB).

== Amateur career ==
Crawford attended Okeechobee High School in Okeechobee, Florida. He then enrolled at the University of Florida, where he played college baseball for the Florida Gators. On June 1, 2012 he threw a no-hitter against Bethune-Cookman. In his three years at Florida, he went 9–8 with a 3.51 earned run average (ERA) with 146 strikeouts.

In the summer of 2012, he played for the United States collegiate national team. In 7 games, he was 3–0 with a 2.02 ERA. He pitched seven scoreless innings before allowing 2 runs in the 8th inning as the U.S. lost to Cuba in the semifinal of the Haarlem Baseball Week tournament.

== Professional career ==
=== Detroit Tigers ===
The Detroit Tigers drafted Crawford in the first round of the 2013 Major League Baseball draft. He signed on June 14, 2013. Crawford made his professional debut that season with the Connecticut Tigers. He finished the year with a 1.89 ERA over eight starts. In 2014, Crawford pitched for the West Michigan Whitecaps. He started 23 games, going 8–3 with a 2.85 ERA with 85 strikeouts in 123 innings.

=== Cincinnati Reds ===
On December 11, 2014, the Tigers traded Crawford and Eugenio Suárez to the Cincinnati Reds for Alfredo Simón. He began 2015 on the disabled list before beginning to rehab with the AZL Reds in late June, pitching three games for them. He then pitched two games for the Daytona Tortugas, giving up five runs in 5.1 innings, but was placed on the disabled list again, and missed the remainder of the season. In 2016, Crawford once again began the season on the disabled list, and did not begin rehabbing in the AZL until June. He returned to Daytona in August and spent the last half of the season there, pitching to a 1–3 record and 6.35 ERA in six starts. He spent 2017 back with Daytona where he was 0–10 with a 5.65 ERA ad 1.96 WHIP in 22 starts.

Crawford missed all of 2019 with an undisclosed injury and elected free agency following the season on November 4, 2019.

=== Team Texas ===
In July 2020, Crawford signed on to play for Team Texas of the Constellation Energy League (a makeshift 4-team independent league created as a result of the COVID-19 pandemic) for the 2020 season.

=== Chicago Dogs ===
On April 1, 2021, Crawford signed with the Chicago Dogs of the American Association of Professional Baseball. Crawford struggled to a 9.36 ERA in 14 appearances with the Dogs and was released on July 19.

=== High Point Rockers ===
On August 7, 2021, Crawford signed with the High Point Rockers of the Atlantic League of Professional Baseball. In 21 games down the stretch, he posted a 4-0 record and 2.70 ERA with 33 strikeouts in 23.1 innings pitched. He became a free agent following the season.

On April 8, 2022, Crawford re-signed with the Rockers for the 2022 season. Crawford made 29 appearances for the Rockers, pitching to a 4.82 ERA with 44 strikeouts in 28 innings of work before he was released on August 8. On April 6, 2023, Crawford re-signed with the Rockers.

=== Staten Island FerryHawks ===
On April 28, 2023, Crawford signed with the Staten Island FerryHawks of the Atlantic League. He made 2 starts for the FerryHawks, surrendering 5 runs (8 earned) on 12 hits and 5 walks with 5 strikeouts in 7 1/3 innings of work. Crawford was released on June 6.

=== Charleston Dirty Birds ===
On June 11, 2023, Crawford signed with the Charleston Dirty Birds of the Atlantic League. After 2 games for Charleston, in which he logged a 6.23 ERA with 5 strikeouts in 4 1/3 innings, Crawford was released by the team on June 20.

In October 2023, Crawford retired from professional baseball and became a real estate agent.

== Personal life ==
Crawford's brother, Kutter, is also a professional baseball player. Kutter made his MLB debut in 2021 with the Boston Red Sox.
