= Mike Relm =

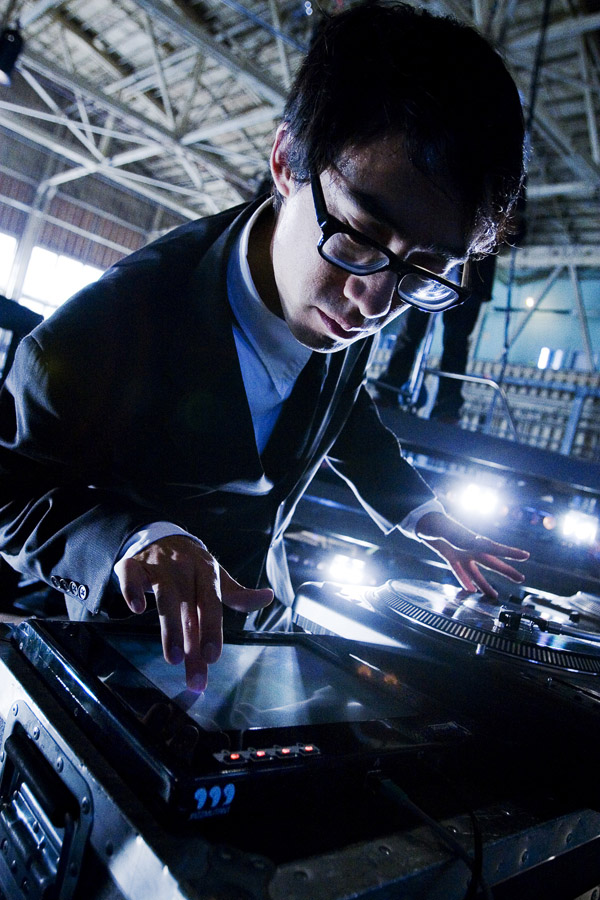
- Mike Relm performing

Background information
- Also known as: Mike Relm, DJ Relm
- Born: Michael Wong; March 12, 1978 (age 48); San Francisco, California, U.S.
- Origin: San Francisco State University
- Genres: Turntablism Hip hop Dance Electronic
- Occupations: DJ/VJ, Director, Editor
- Instruments: Technics 1210 M5G turntables, Serato DJ Pro, Pioneer S9 mixer
- Website: mikerelm.com

Michael Wong (born 1978), better known by his stage name Mike Relm, is an American disc jockey, turntablist, director, and VJ from San Francisco, California.

== Biography ==
He has performed with notable hip-hop artists The Pharcyde, Lyrics Born, Money Mark, Gift of Gab, Del tha Funkee Homosapien, Mike Patton, and D-Sharp. In 1999 he won the International Turntablist Federation's USA competition. More recently he toured as part of Mike Patton's Peeping Tom project. As a solo artist, Relm is known for live performances which feature a series of audio mashups paired with video images, manipulated in real-time with turntables and Serato DJ Pro.

Mike Relm toured with Blue Man Group from 2007 to 2008 and Tony Hawk in 2008. He performed at the 2007 Coachella Valley Music and Arts Festival and Bonnaroo, as well as the Audiotistic-Future Sound Festival which featured Outkast and Mos Def. In 2005 he released a DVD called Suit Yourself, which documents his time on the "Fourth Dimensional Rocketships" tour with Gift of Gab. He most recently opened for Diggnation Live at the House of Blues in San Diego, California.

In 2008, he released "Everytime" featuring Del the Funky Homosapien; producing the song as well as directing the music video.

In addition to producing music, he has been hired to direct music videos, commercials, and short films. He directed the Jabbawockeez in their first music video "Devastating Stereo", as well as Funeral Party in "New York City Moves to the Sound of LA" and "Just Because".

In 2010 he launched his Relmvision channel on YouTube where he features remixes of films, commercials, viral videos, and television shows in which he re-edits visual elements over music he composes. His unique style helped him gain over 120,000 subscribers in under 12 months, and his videos views are in the millions. Notable remixes include Iron Man 2, Old Spice, Scott Pilgrim Vs. The World, Doctor Who, and Harry Potter. His Punisher/Spirit/Transporter remix won the 2009 Webby Award for Best Mashup/Remix.

In 2014, Relm was listed on New Media Rockstars Top 100 Channels, ranked at #79.

In 2015, he became The Pharcyde's tour DJ/VJ.

In 2019, Relm produced and performed the opening for the Fortnite World Cup at the Arthur Ashe Stadium in New York.

== Remix discography ==
- Iron Man 2 (TV Spot)
- Back to the Future (TV Spot)
- The Cornetto Trilogy
- Baby Driver
- Amy Schumer
- Child's Play
- Parasite
- Avengers Endgame
- Shazam!
- Swoozie's 99 Princess Problems
- Joker
- It
- Home Alone
- Wonder Woman
- Deadpool
- The Jungle Book
- Star Wars
- The Walking Dead
- Vsauce
- Everly
- Godzilla
- Get Out
- MIB International
- Cowboys & Aliens
- Harry Potter
- Scott Pilgrim vs. the World
- The Devil's Double
- 0000
- Happy Endings
- Philip DeFranco
- Aziz Ansari
- Burlesque
- S'leb Suit
- Key of Awesome
- Smosh 2010
- MysteryGuitarMan
- Limitless
- Smosh 2011
- Texas Chainsaw 3D
- ShaneDawsonTV
- Smosh 2012
- Smosh 2013
- Smosh 2014
- Smosh 2015
- Smosh 2016

== Discography ==
- Radio Fryer (self-released, 2005)
- Spectacle (Radiofried Records, 2008)

== Battle records ==
- Leave it to Beaver (BEAVER001-VINYL, STA Records, 1999)
- Jugglin' Jaws (JAWZ001-VINYL, Thud Rumble, 2001)
- Aaahs: Session 1 (WIZ-002, Wizard Records, 2003)
- The Zodyax Scop System

== Videography ==
- Scratch (Palm, 2000)
- Along Came Polly (Universal, 2004)
- Suit Yourself (self-released, 2006)
- Clown Alley: Relm's first film experience.
- Blue Man Group: How to Be a Megastar Live! (Blue Man Group/Rhino, 2008)

== Album features ==
- Awaken (Electromatrix, 2000)

== Other credits ==
- Skratchcon 2000 (documentary film, Director, Co-Editor; 2000)
