= Okeechobee High School (1925) =

1925 school building in Okeechobee, Florida, US

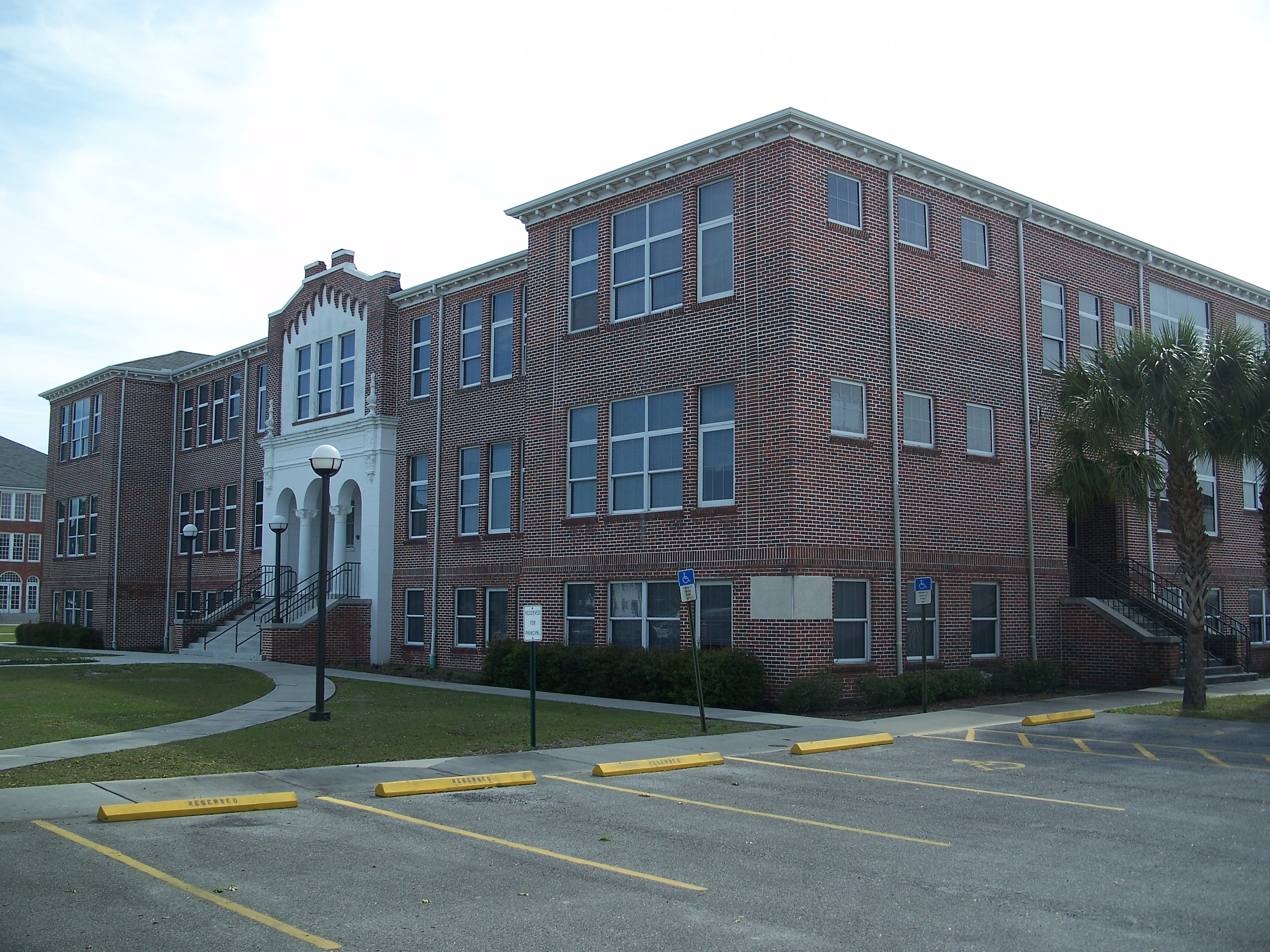
- Interactive map of the Okeechobee High School (1925) area

General information
- Architectural style: Southern Colonial Revival,
- Location: 610 SW 2nd Ave. Okeechobee, Florida, United States
- Coordinates: 27.23724°N 80.83157°W
- Construction started: 1925
- Completed: 1925
- Client: Okeechobee County Schools

Design and construction
- Architects: William Hatcher and Lawrence Funke
- Engineer: Builder: Rogers and Duncanson

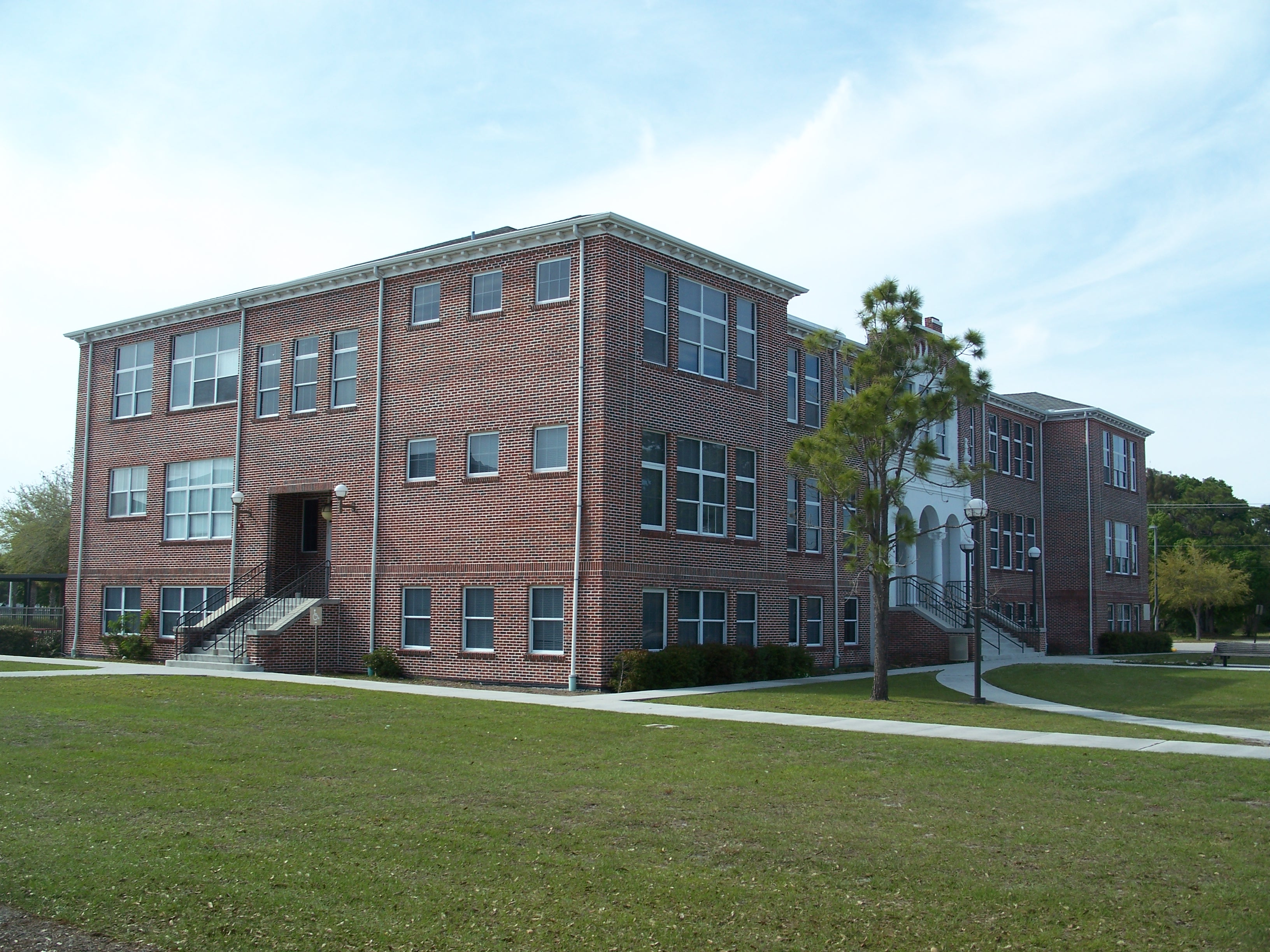

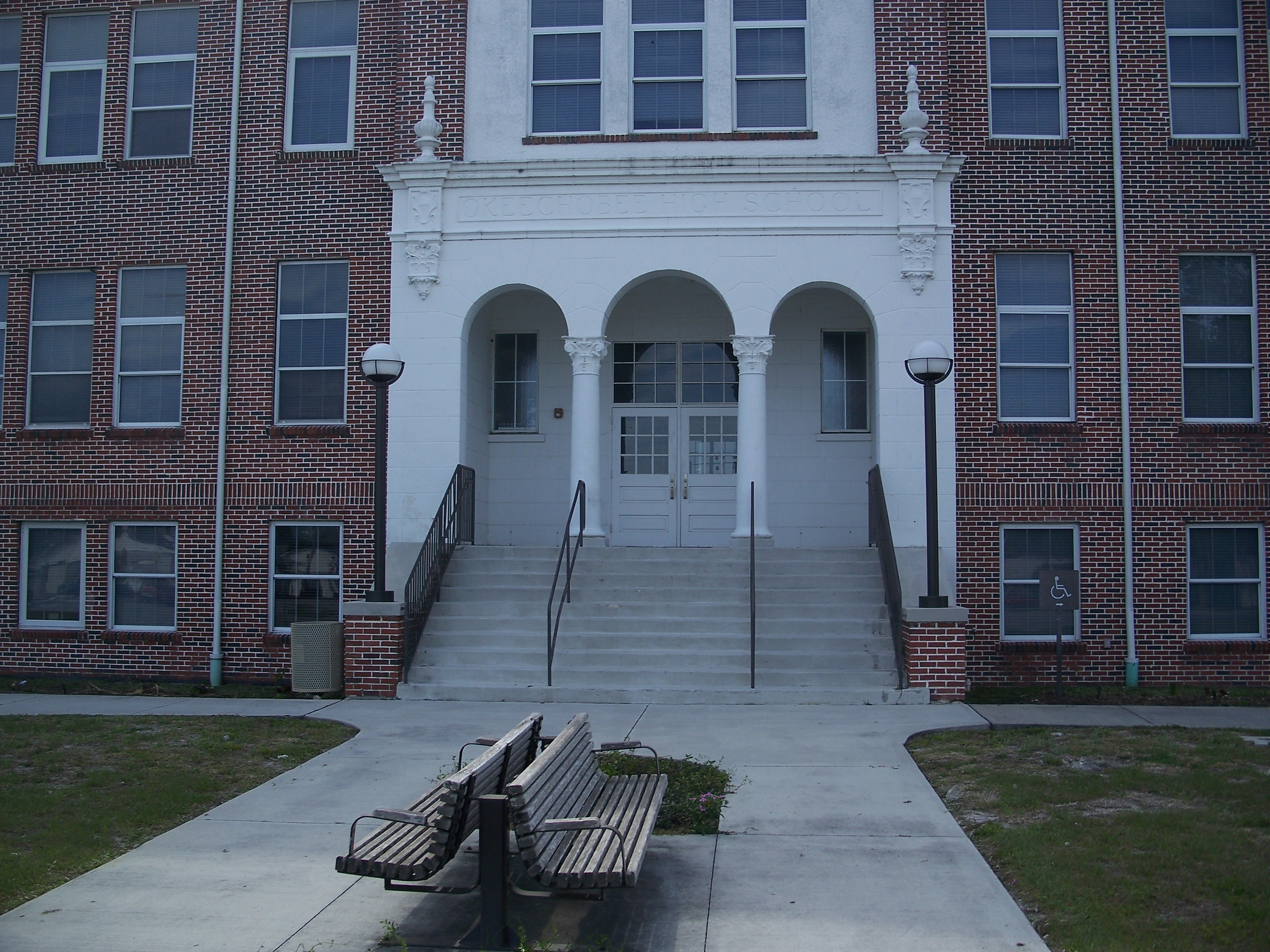

The Okeechobee High School (1925) is an historic redbrick school building located at 610 SW 2nd Avenue in Okeechobee, Florida. Designed by architects William Hatcher and Lawrence Funke, it was built in 1925 by Rogers and Duncanson. In 1989, it was listed in A Guide to Florida's Historic Architecture, published by the University of Florida Press.

The new Okeechobee High School is now located at 2800 Highway 441 North and the 1925 building is the Okeechobee Freshman Campus.
