= Okeechobee Music & Arts Festival =

Annual festival in Florida, US

Coordinates: 27.3598°N 80.7335°W

Okeechobee Music and Arts Festival
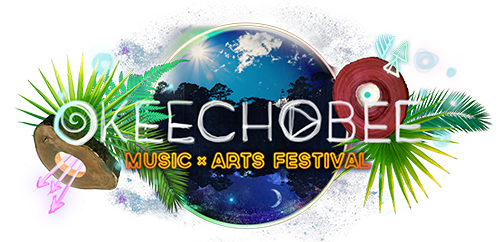
- Genre: Rock, jam bands, alternative rock, indie, hip hop, R&B, funk, reggae, EDM, jazz, Americana, country, folk, gospel, reggae, world
- Locations: Sunshine Grove; 12517 NE 91st Ave; Okeechobee, Florida 34972, USA
- Years active: 2016–2018, 2020, 2022-present
- Founders: Soundslinger, LLC
- Website: okeechobeefest.com

The Okeechobee Music and Arts Festival (commonly referred to as Okeechobee) is an annual four-day music and arts festival. It is held at the 800-acre Sunshine Grove property in Okeechobee, Florida.

== History ==
The first Okeechobee Music and Arts Festival was held March 4–6, 2016. With artists such as Bassnectar, Skrillex, Kendrick Lamar, and Mumford & Sons, the festival drew around 32,000 attendees in its first year. The festival is produced by Soundslinger, LLC, an independent company founded by Steve Sybesma, formerly of Sunshine Promotions, Paul Peck formerly of Superfly (Bonnaroo Music Festival), and a team of producers who have presented other major festivals and concerts around the globe. It was announced in late 2016 that both Sybesma and Peck would be leaving the company on good terms, and Kevin Collinsworth was appointed CEO. Soundslinger is headquartered in Miami, with offices in New York City.

After announcing in November 2018 that it would go on hiatus, EDM promoter Insomniac acquired a controlling stake in Soundslinger in June 2019. The festival returned in 2020 with an upgraded production and redesigned stages patterned after the visual style of other Insomniac festivals (such as Electric Daisy Carnival), while maintaining the existing mix of genres. The festival went on hiatus in 2024 and 2025, with Soundslinger telling the Miami New Times that Insomniac would no longer be involved. The festival returned in 2026, with no news yet for future dates.

== Festival summary by year ==
| Edition | Year | Dates | Headliners |
|---|---|---|---|
| 1st | 2016 | March 4–6 | Mumford & Sons; Kendrick Lamar; Skrillex |
| 2nd | 2017 | March 2–5 | Kings of Leon; Usher & the Roots; Flume |
| 3rd | 2018 | March 1–4 | Arcade Fire; Bassnectar (two sets); Halsey; Travis Scott |
| 4th | 2020 | March 5–8 | Rüfüs Du Sol; Bassnectar; Vampire Weekend; Mumford & Sons |
| 5th | 2022 | March 3-6 | Tame Impala; Porter Robinson; Megan Thee Stallion; Rezz; GRiZ |
| 6th | 2023 | March 2-5 | Excision; Odesza; GRiZ; Goose; Baby Keem |
| 7th | 2026 | March 19-22 | Cage the Elephant; GRiZ; Fisher (musician); LCD Soundsystem; The Lumineers |
