= Evan Neal =

American football player (born 2000)

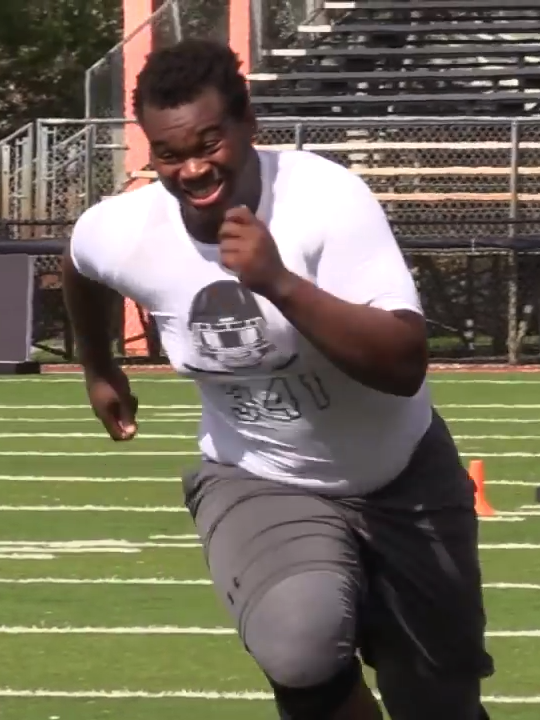
- Neal in 2017

No. 79 – Philadelphia Eagles
- Position: Guard
- Roster status: Practice squad

Personal information
- Born: September 19, 2000 (age 26); Okeechobee, Florida, U.S.
- Listed height: 6 ft 7 in (2.01 m)
- Listed weight: 340 lb (154 kg)

Career information
- High school: IMG Academy (Bradenton, Florida)
- College: Alabama (2019–2021)
- NFL draft: 2022: 1st round, 7th overall pick

Career history
- New York Giants (2022–2025); Las Vegas Raiders (2026)*; Philadelphia Eagles (2026–present)*
- * Offseason or practice squad member only

Awards and highlights
- CFP national champion (2020); Consensus All-American (2021); First-team All-SEC (2021)

Career NFL statistics as of 2025
- Games played: 29
- Games started: 27
- Stats at Pro Football Reference

Evan Neal (born September 19, 2000) is an American professional football guard for the Philadelphia Eagles for the National Football League (NFL). He played college football for the Alabama Crimson Tide and was selected seventh overall by the New York Giants in the 2022 NFL draft.

== Early life ==
Neal was born on September 19, 2000, in Okeechobee, Florida. He originally attended Okeechobee High School before transferring to IMG Academy in Bradenton, Florida. He played in the 2019 Under Armour All-America Game. A five-star recruit, Neal committed to play college football at the University of Alabama.

== College career ==
Neal started all 13 games at left guard during his freshman year in 2019 before moving to right tackle in 2020. He was a starting member of the team that won the 2021 College Football Playoff National Championship. Following the 2021 season, Neal announced that he would forgo his senior year and enter the 2022 NFL draft.

== Professional career ==
Pre-draft measurables
Height	Weight	Arm length	Hand span	Wingspan
6 ft 7 1/2 in (2.02 m)	337 lb (153 kg)	34 in (0.86 m)	10 1/8 in (0.26 m)	6 ft 11 in (2.11 m)
All values from NFL Combine

=== New York Giants ===
Neal was selected seventh overall by the New York Giants in the 2022 NFL draft. In Week 8 against the Jacksonville Jaguars, Neal suffered a grade 2 MCL sprain. He returned in week 13. He played in and started 13 regular season games and both of the Giants' playoff games as a rookie.

When asked about the booing Giants fans following a week 4 2023 season loss to the Seattle Seahawks where Daniel Jones was sacked eleven times, Neal responded with "Why would a lion concern himself with the opinion of a sheep? ... I genuinely don't care. Why should I? I'm in the National Football League. The person that's commenting on my performance, what does he do? Flip hot dogs and hamburgers somewhere?”. After receiving a large amount of backlash, he posted an apology on social media the next day. On December 24, 2023, the Giants placed him on injured reserve.

In the 2025 offseason, the Giants switched Neal from tackle to guard. On April 25, 2025, the Giants declined the fifth-year option of Neal's rookie contract making him a free agent in 2026. On November 15, he was placed on injured reserve with a hamstring injury.

On March 11, 2026, Neal re-signed with the Giants on a one-year contract for a veteran-minimum salary and received a clean slate with a new coaching staff. He was released by New York as a part of final roster cuts on August 30.

=== Las Vegas Raiders ===
On September 3, 2026, Neal signed with the Las Vegas Raiders' practice squad. He was released from the practice squad on October 19.

=== Philadelphia Eagles ===
On October 22, 2026, Neal signed to the Philadelphia Eagles practice squad.

== Personal life ==
Neal's father, Eddie, played linebacker at Tulane while three uncles — Frankie Neal, Cleveland Gary, and Jimmie Jones — played in the NFL.
