= Doran Chambers =

American DJ and electronic music producer

Background information
- Also known as: DJ Doran
- Origin: Los Angeles, California
- Genres: Progressive trance ambient
- Years active: 1995–2001
- Labels: Rampant, Fragrant Music; City of Angels; Crush Recordings
- Website: Official Web site

Doran Chambers is a trance and house disc jockey and electronic music producer from Los Angeles, California, who performs under the name DJ Doran. His DJ mix CDs include Planet Rampant Vol. 1, Planet Rampant Vol. 2, Fragrant Sense, Monuments, Electric Daisy Carnival and Automatic. Doran has released tracks and remixes on various labels including Rampant, Fragrant, Max Music, and City of Angels record labels.

Due to ear-related problems, Doran has recently retired from DJing. He now works full-time running his Flash design/development company, dCent designs.

DJ Doran also performed at the Electric Daisy Carnival electronic music festival in Southern California in 2001. The tracks that he chose to play there were released on an album by the same name.

== Discography ==
- Monuments, 1998
- Fragrant Sense, 1999
- Electric Daisy Carnival, 2000
