= Reggie Rembert =

American football player (born 1966)

No. 88, 80
- Position: Wide receiver

Personal information
- Born: December 25, 1966 (age 59); Okeechobee, Florida, U.S.
- Listed height: 6 ft 5 in (1.96 m)
- Listed weight: 200 lb (91 kg)

Career information
- High school: Okeechobee (Okeechobee, Florida)
- College: Independence; West Virginia
- NFL draft: 1990: 2nd round, 28th overall pick

Career history
- Cincinnati Bengals (1990–1993)

Awards and highlights
- Third-team All-American (1989); 2× First-team All-East (1988, 1989)

Career NFL statistics
- Receptions: 36
- Receiving yards: 437
- Touchdowns: 1
- Stats at Pro Football Reference

Reginald Bernard Rembert (born December 25, 1966) is an American former professional football player who was a wide receiver in the National Football League (NFL). He was selected in the second round (28th overall) of the 1990 NFL draft by the New York Jets. He played college football for the West Virginia Mountaineers.

Rembert played only three of four seasons in the NFL. He did not play as a rookie, as he never signed with the Jets and was traded to the Cincinnati Bengals.

== Early life ==
Rembert began his football career at the age of seven, when he joined a Pee Wee league. He became the Most Valuable Player, but was cut from his seventh-grade team.

To begin his high school career, Rembert played tailback. However, in his senior year, he was moved to receiver. Then at 6'4" and 160-pounds, he recorded 15 touchdown receptions and All-State honors, but could not qualify for a scholarship.

== College career ==
=== Start at West Virginia ===
After being named an All-American at the Independence Community College junior college, Rembert was picked up in the summer of 1987 by the Mountaineers and enrolled at West Virginia for the 1988 season. He was coached by receivers coach Doc Holliday, and was reported by Holliday to have run a 4.3 40-yard dash.

=== Junior (Juco. transfer 1988) ===
As a junior, Rembert was All-American quarterback Major Harris' favorite target for the Fiesta Bowl-bound Mountaineers. He reeled in 23 passes for 516 yards and seven touchdowns as a major deep threat, averaging 22.7 yards per catch. He also ran the end-around nine times for 144 yards and two touchdowns. After the season, he made the Associated Press All-East Team. at independence community college.

=== Senior (1989) ===
As a senior in 1989, Rembert increased his numbers to 47 catches for 850 yards and 11 touchdowns. His best game was against Pitt in the Backyard Brawl, when he caught a career-high 145 yards on five receptions.

Rembert is often considered one of the greatest Mountaineer receivers in the university's football history, along with other greats such as Jerry Porter and Chris Henry. Rembert ended his career close to many West Virginia football records, and is ranked high on many of the career receiving statistic lists.

=== Career statistics ===
Rembert ranks 16th on WVU's all-time leading receivers.

			Receiving				
Year	Team	G	Rec	Yards	Y/R	TD	LNG
1988	West Virginia Mountaineers	--	23	516	22.7	7	--
1989	West Virginia Mountaineers	--	47	850	18.0	11	--
Total		--	70	1,366	19.5	18	--

== Professional career ==
=== New York Jets ===
Rembert was selected by the New York Jets in the second round, 28th overall in the 1990 NFL draft. Rembert never played during the 1990 season for the Jets as they were unable to come to an agreement on a contract, and eventually his rights were traded to the Cincinnati Bengals before the 1991 NFL season.

=== Cincinnati Bengals ===
Rembert was signed by the Cincinnati Bengals for the 1991 season. Although he played in all 16 games, Rembert only recorded nine receptions for 117 yards and a touchdown. The following season, 1992, Rembert only played in nine games, but had his best statistical season of his career. He caught 19 passes for 219 yards on the season from quarterback Boomer Esiason, who was playing his final season in Cincinnati.

In Rembert's final season, 1993, he played in just three games. He recorded eight receptions for 101 yards to end his career.

=== Career statistics ===
			Receiving				
Year	Team	G	Rec	Yards	Y/R	TD	LNG
1990	New York Jets	0	0	0	0.0	0	0
1991	Cincinnati Bengals	16	9	117	13.0	1	23
1992	Cincinnati Bengals	9	19	219	11.5	0	27
1993	Cincinnati Bengals	3	8	101	12.6	0	21
Total		28	36	437	12.1	1	27

== Personal ==
Rembert is considered one of the all-time "Impact Recruits" for WVU, ranking in at #7.

He has five children, one of whom, Reggie, was a walk-on at West Virginia and played wide receiver.
