= Electric Daisy Carnival (album) =

Studio album by DJ Doran
- Released: 2000
- Genre: Trance
- Label: 1500 Records
- Producer: Doran Chambers

DJ Doran chronology
Fragrant Sense	Electric Daisy Carnival

Electric Daisy Carnival is a 2000 trance album by Los Angeles-based DJ Doran. The album shares the same name of an electronic music festival held yearly in Las Vegas, though formally in Southern California.

== Track listing ==
1. Doran - "Tulare (E.D.C Remix)"
2. D & A - "Crystal"
3. Slipstream - "Krakatao"
4. Manhattan - "Your Spirit (Magic Alex Mix)"
5. Monteverde - "Interface"
6. Task Force - "Touch Me (Thrillseekers Mix)"
7. Nylon - "If You Love Me"
8. Doran vs. Joshua Ryan - "Redivider (Doran's Euroflex Mix)"
9. Sleepwalker - "Face To Face"
10. I-Ching - "The Forgotten Dream"
11. Cygnus X - "Superstring (Rank 1 Mix)"

== History ==
The CD cover gives a short history of the music gathering and Doran Chamber's contributions.

There have been several Electric Daisy Carnivals produced by Insomniac. Year 2000 was headlined by DJ Doran Chambers. "Saturday June 24th 2000, 25,0000 ravers headed out to California's Central Valley...for the ninth annual.... The Electric Daisy Carnival CD captures the best of Doran's trance set from the event."

== The festival ==
The annual festival, commonly referred to as EDC, was held in Southern California from its debut in 1997 until 2010. Due to controversy surrounding the festival, the event moved states from California to Las Vegas, Nevada, where it has been ever since.
