= Kutter Crawford =

American baseball player (born 1996)

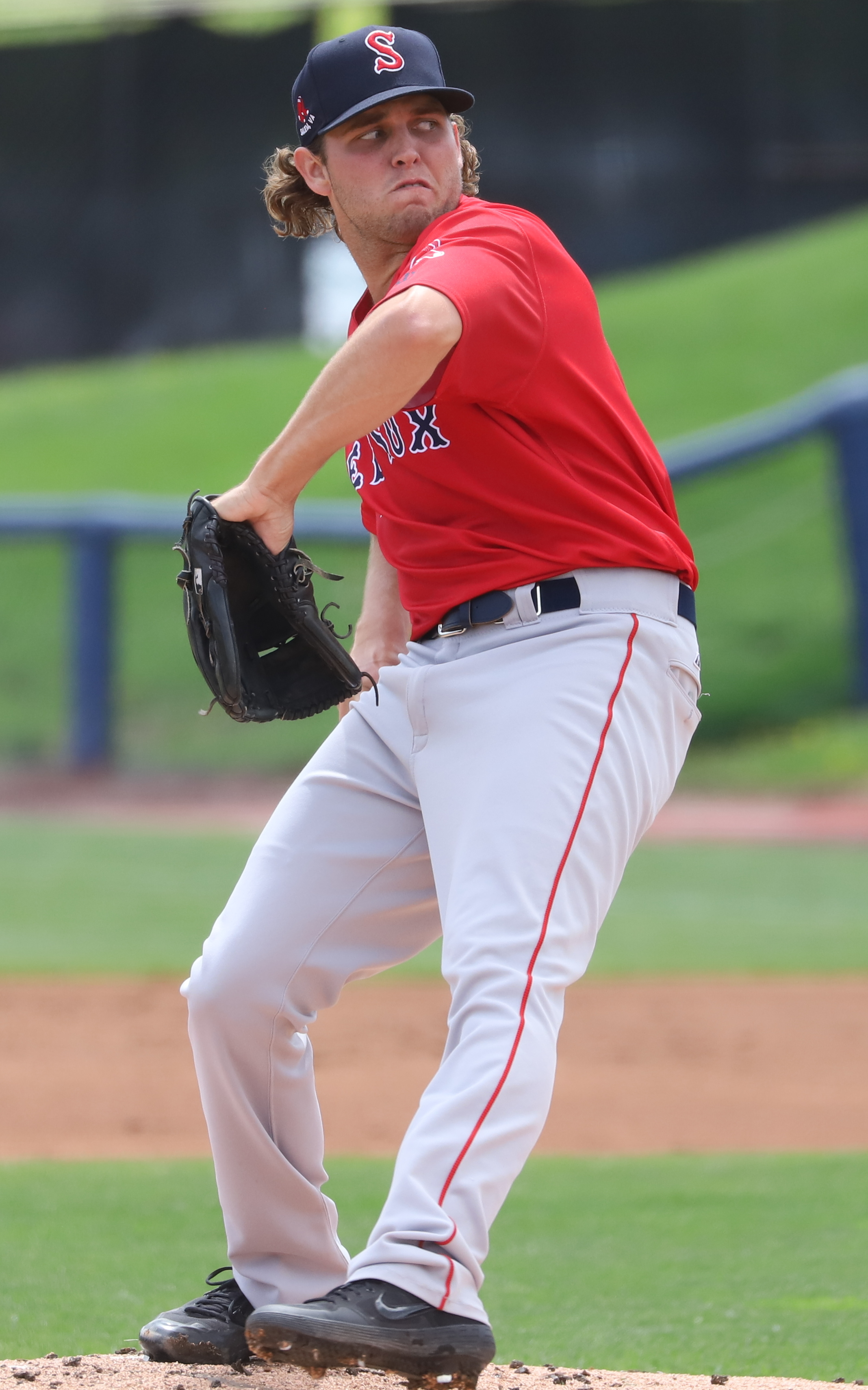
- Crawford with the Salem Red Sox in 2019

Boston Red Sox – No. 50
- Pitcher
- Born: April 1, 1996 (age 30); Okeechobee, Florida, U.S.
- Bats: Right Throws: Right

MLB debut
- September 5, 2021, for the Boston Red Sox

MLB statistics (through 2024 season)
- Win–loss record: 18–31
- Earned run average: 4.56
- Strikeouts: 389
- Stats at Baseball Reference

Teams
- Boston Red Sox (2021–2024)

Kutter Martin Crawford (born April 1, 1996) is an American professional baseball pitcher for the Boston Red Sox of Major League Baseball (MLB). He made his MLB debut in 2021. Listed at 6 feet 1 inch (1.85 m) and 209 pounds (95 kg), he throws and bats right-handed.

== Early life ==
Crawford is the son of Neal and Kristy Crawford. He attended Okeechobee High School in Okeechobee, Florida where he was a four-year letterman in baseball and golf. He posted a .340 batting average his senior season, which was the highest on the team. He was named the Okeechobee High School MVP. Crawford attended his freshman and sophomore years of college at Indian River State College. During his freshman year at Indian River in 2015, he made 9 appearances and went 3–2 with a 4.15 ERA. He was a member of the FCSAA All-Academic Team and Dean's List. During his sophomore season in 2016, he made 14 appearances and posted a 1–2 record with a 4.05 ERA. He ranked 2nd on the team with 80.0 IP and struck out a team-leading 69 batters. After his first two seasons, he transferred to Florida Gulf Coast University. During his time at FGCU, he was named ASUN First Team All-Conference after leading the ASUN and ranking 8th in the NCAA with a 1.71 ERA. He was the first Eagle taken in the MLB Draft as the Boston Red Sox selected him in the 16th round.

== Professional career ==
Crawford made his professional debut in 2017, making a single start with the Low-A Lowell Spinners of the New York–Penn League. He split time during 2018 with the Single-A Greenville Drive and High-A Salem Red Sox, making a total of 27 starts and compiling a 7–7 win–loss record with a 3.26 earned run average (ERA). Crawford returned to Salem in 2019, and was promoted to the Portland Sea Dogs of Double-A. He pitched in only one game after mid-July, and ultimately underwent Tommy John surgery in October 2019. He did not pitch professionally during 2020, due to cancellation of the minor league season because of the COVID-19 pandemic, and had surgery mid-year to remove bone spurs in his elbow.

Crawford began 2021 in Portland before being promoted to the Worcester Red Sox of Triple-A. On September 5, Boston added Crawford to their active roster as a COVID-19 replacement. He started that day's game against the Cleveland Indians, taking the loss after allowing five runs in two innings. He was returned to Worcester the following day and removed from the 40-man roster. Between Worcester and Portland, Crawford made 20 minor-league appearances (19 starts), pitching to a 6–6 record with 4.28 ERA. Crawford was later named the recipient of the Red Sox' Lou Gorman Award. He played in the Dominican Professional Baseball League (LIDOM) during the offseason. On November 19, in advance of the Rule 5 draft, the Red Sox added Crawford to their 40-man roster.

Crawford was named to Boston's active roster to start the 2022 season. He was placed on the restricted list in late April prior to a series in Toronto, as he was apparently not vaccinated against COVID-19 (required to enter Canada); he rejoined the team on April 29 in Baltimore. On May 14, the Red Sox optioned Crawford to Worcester. He was recalled in June for a week, and again in early July. On September 4, Crawford was placed on Boston's injured list with a right shoulder impingement. Overall with the Red Sox during 2022, Crawford compiled a 3–6 record in 21 games (12 starts) with a 5.47 ERA while striking out 77 batters in 77 1/3 innings.

Crawford began the 2023 season with Boston, and was optioned to Worcester on April 11 when Garrett Whitlock was activated from the injured list. He was recalled two days later, when Zack Kelly was placed on the injured list. On May 5, Crawford was placed in the injured list, due to a left hamstring strain. On May 6, Crawford was ejected from a game and fined for not leaving the field after the conclusion of the national anthem despite an umpire's warning. Philadelphia Phillies pitcher Matt Strahm was also ejected for taking part in the "anthem standoff" where players compete to leave the field last. The ejection and subsequent fine was largely due to the introduction of the pitch clock, intended to speed up the game and prevent unnecessary delays. Crawford was activated from the injured list on May 19. In 31 appearances (23 starts) for Boston, he logged a 6–8 record and 4.04 ERA with 135 strikeouts across 129 1/3 innings pitched.

Crawford made a league-leading 33 starts for Boston during the 2024 campaign, compiling a 9–16 record (his 16 losses were also a league-high) and 4.36 ERA with a career-high 175 strikeouts across 183 2/3 innings pitched.

In 2025, Crawford began spring training behind schedule due to lingering knee soreness, later specified as patellar tendinopathy, an issue which ultimately caused him to begin the season on the injured list. He was transferred to the 60-day injured list on May 16, 2025. While attempting to progress towards a rehab assignment, Crawford was shut down due to a wrist issue. On June 25, manager Alex Cora announced that Crawford would undergo wrist surgery and likely miss the remainder of the season. Crawford also missed the entire 2026 season due to injury marking the second straight without an appearance.

== Personal life ==
Crawford is the younger brother of Jonathon Crawford, who was selected in the first round of the 2013 MLB draft by the Detroit Tigers.

In December 2025, Crawford got engaged to his girlfriend, Alexandra.

Awards
Preceded by Trevor Kelley	Lou Gorman Award; 2021	Succeeded by Zack Kelly
