= Club Glow =

American electronic music event promoter

Coordinates: 38°54′7.7″N 77°1′58.1″W

- Interactive map of Club Glow
- Location: Washington, D.C.
- Owner: Subsidiary of Insomniac Events
- Type: Dance party

Construction
- Opened: 1999; 27 years ago

Website
- Club Glow

Club Glow is the longest running electronic music event promoter on the East Coast and venue owner based in Washington, D.C. Established in 1999. They currently operate the venues Echostage and Soundcheck and host numerous large-scale events and music festivals at the DC Armory and RFK Stadium, including Project GLOW and Moonrise Music Festival. Club Glow regularly brings top international talent to Echostage, and in 2021 the venue obtained the first place in the world by DJ Magazine's "Top 100 Clubs," and has been voted as "the best electronic music venue in North America" since 2017. Club Glow became a subsidiary of Insomniac Events in 2020 and the creative partnership has helped the company expand throughout the East Coast.

== History ==
- March 1999: Club Glow founder Antonis Karagounis and partner Pete Kalamoutsos attend the Winter Music Conference in Miami. After hearing trance artist George Acosta perform, they decide to bring him to DC, giving birth to Club Glow.
- 2001: Upcoming Dutch trance producer Armin van Buuren performs at Club Glow in his second U.S. booking. He and Ferry Corsten share alternating, bi-monthly DJ residencies at Club Glow through 2003.
- August 29, 2001: Club Glow hosts its first international party at Space nightclub in Ibiza with George Acosta and Talla 2XLC.
- March 25, 2002: Club Glow hosts its first event at Winter Music Conference, featuring Ferry Corsten and Armin van Buuren.
- December 28, 2002: Edgar V and Paul Van Dyk play at GLOW. This was the first time that Paul Van Dyk ever came to GLOW. Some notable tracks he played include Otro Dia, For an Angel, and Three Drives - Carrera 2 (Nu-NRG Mix)
- November 4, 2003: Club Glow's Pete Moutso releases "One Night At Glow," becoming the first American DJ to release a record on Tiësto's Black Hole Recordings record label.
- September 15, 2007: As part of the Elements of Life World Tour, Club Glow hosts Tiesto before an audience of 8,000 people in the outdoor lot outside Love Nightclub in Northeast DC.
- March 2011: Club Glow receives a nomination for "Best U.S. Club" at the 2011 International Dance Music Awards.
- April 9, 2011: Club Glow hosts Tiesto at the DC Armory before a sold-out crowd of 10,000 people. The event gains the attention of The Washington Post, drawing speculation about Tiesto's musical evolution as a "trance-house-dubstep" DJ.
- August 18, 2011: Partnership with Live Nation enables Club Glow to host Identity Festival at Jiffy Lube Live in Bristow, Virginia.
- November 18–19, 2011: Club Glow hosts Super Glow at DC Armory, drawing nearly 20,000 people. Concerts feature Avicii and Armin van Buuren.
- September 22, 2012: Club Glow hosts first event ever at Echostage with Sander Van Doorn, Sunnery James and Ryan Marciano.
- October 30, 2020: Insomniac Events announces their acquisition of Club Glow, Echostage, and Soundcheck. The deal had closed over a year before the official announcement, with the COVID-19 pandemic delaying initial plans to announce the acquisition at the 2020 Winter Music Conference. Club Glow CEO Pete Kalamoutsos will remain in Washington to manage Echostage.
- January 11, 2022: Club Glow and Insomniac announce Project Glow Festival: A celebration of 20 years of dance culture in the District. The two-day festival took place at the RFK Stadium Festival Grounds with headliners such as Martin Garrix; mixing veteran global electronic acts such as Above & Beyond, popular American DJs such as Diplo, and emerging talent like John Summit.
- May, 1st 2022: The second location of Project GLOW is announced in Philadelphia for October 1 and 2 at Subaru Park. Headliners include Alison Wonderland, Illenium, Troyboi, Dom Dolla B2B Green Velvet and more.

== References in Media ==
- David Guetta listed Club Glow as his top club of 2010 in an interview with DJ Magazine.
- Armin van Buuren listed Club Glow's venue, Lima Lounge, as his "best new club visited this year" in 2010 in an interview with DJ Magazine.
- Armin van Buuren featured live DJ sets recorded at Club Glow on episodes 052, 067, 087, and 105 of his A State of Trance radio show.
- After the inaugural Project GLOW, Dancing Astronaut declared the festival a large and impactful addition to the East Coast festival scene.

== See also ==
- List of electronic dance music venues
- Echostage
