= Nathan Shepherd =

Canadian-born American football player (born 1993)

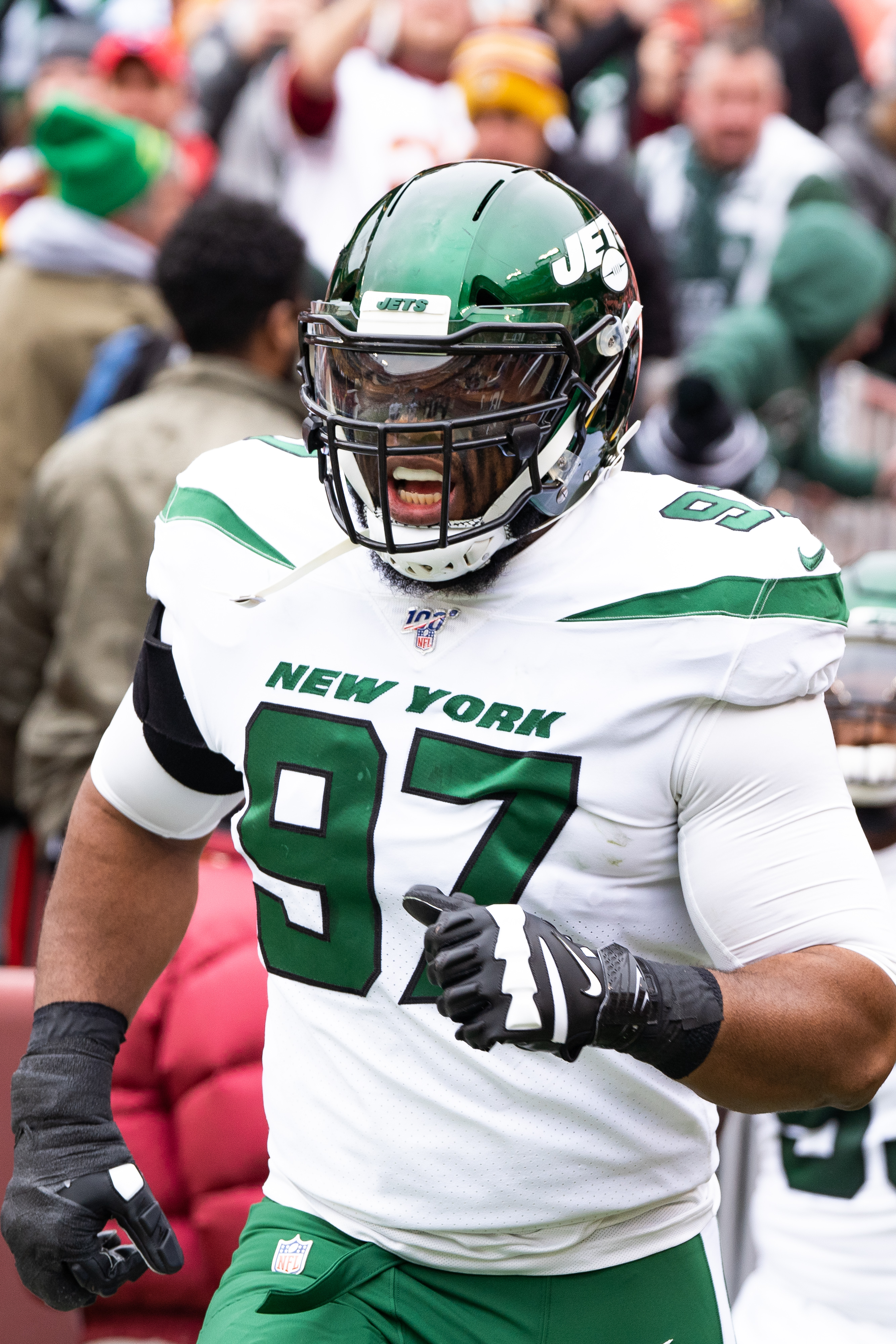
- Shepherd with the New York Jets in 2019

No. 93 – New Orleans Saints
- Position: Defensive tackle
- Roster status: Active

Personal information
- Born: October 9, 1993 (age 33); Ajax, Ontario, Canada
- Listed height: 6 ft 4 in (1.93 m)
- Listed weight: 315 lb (143 kg)

Career information
- High school: J. Clarke Richardson Collegiate (Ajax, Ontario, Canada)
- College: Simon Fraser (2012); Fort Hays State (2015–2017)
- NFL draft: 2018: 3rd round, 72nd overall pick

Career history
- New York Jets (2018–2022); New Orleans Saints (2023–present)

Awards and highlights
- MIAA Defensive Player of the Year (2017)

Career NFL statistics as of 2025
- Total tackles: 238
- Sacks: 14
- Forced fumbles: 1
- Stats at Pro Football Reference

Nathan Daniel Shepherd (born October 9, 1993) is a Canadian professional football defensive tackle for the New Orleans Saints of the National Football League (NFL). He played college football for the Simon Fraser Clan and Fort Hays State Tigers.

== Early life ==
Shepherd grew up in Ajax, Ontario, where he played youth football with the Ajax/Pickering Dolphins Football Club.

== College career ==
At Simon Fraser University, Shepherd redshirted his first year and was able to start every game his second year as a defensive end. He left the university after a total of two years, as he was no longer able to pay tuition. After leaving Simon Fraser, Shepherd spent time in various jobs including working in a plant nursery, electrical construction, and a cardboard box factory. Fort Hays State University later reached out to Shepherd, and Shepherd was able to pay his first semester of tuition before being put on athletic scholarship. After his 2017 season, Shepherd was named the Mid-America Intercollegiate Athletics Association Defensive Player of the Year. He was also invited to play in the 2018 Senior Bowl.

== Professional career ==
=== Pre-draft ===
On November 20, 2017, it was announced that Shepherd had accepted his invitation to play in the 2018 Senior Bowl. He became the first player from Fort Hays State to receive an invitation to the Senior Bowl. Shepherd was productive during Senior Bowl practices and had his draft stock rise significantly after displaying speed, power, and technique while going up against the top offensive linemen in the nation. Shepherd suffered a broken hand during Senior Bowl practice and was unable to participate in the official game.

External videos
- Shepherd: journey to top DT prospect
- Shepherd suffers hand injury at Senior Bowl

“NFL body, NFL movement skills. I’ve had a couple NFL people tell me that he’s actually bigger than Malik Jackson, but offers that kind of versatility of inside-outside. He’s a powerful man and very raw. A guy that could affect quarterbacks and the run game”

— Mike Mayock

Shepherd attended the NFL Scouting Combine in Indianapolis and completed the majority of combine drills, but opted to skip the bench press due to his fractured hand. His performance continued to raise his draft stock and garnered him attention throughout the draft process. On March 12, 2018, Shepherd held a pro day at Fort Hays State, but opted to stand on his combine numbers and only performed positional drills for the scouts and team representatives from 16 NFL teams that attended. Shepherd attended ten private meetings with team and also performed at private workouts for multiple teams, that included the Dallas Cowboys, Arizona Cardinals, Atlanta Falcons, and Houston Texans. At the conclusion of the pre-draft process, Shepherd was projected to be a second or third round pick by NFL draft experts and scouts. He was ranked as the sixth best defensive tackle prospect in the draft by DraftScout.com and Scouts Inc.

External videos
- Nathan Shepherd's NFL Combine Workout
- Nathan Shepherd runs 40-yard dash
- NFL Draft Profile: Nathan Shepherd

Pre-draft measurables
Height	Weight	Arm length	Hand span	Wingspan	40-yard dash	10-yard split	20-yard split	20-yard shuttle	Three-cone drill	Vertical jump	Broad jump
6 ft 3 3/4 in (1.92 m)	315 lb (143 kg)	32 3/8 in (0.82 m)	10 1/8 in (0.26 m)	6 ft 8 1/2 in (2.04 m)	5.09 s	1.77 s	2.94 s	4.53 s	7.50 s	31 in (0.79 m)	9 ft 4 in (2.84 m)
All values from NFL Combine

=== New York Jets ===
The New York Jets selected Shepherd in the third round (72nd overall) in the 2018 NFL draft. Shepherd was the sixth defensive tackle drafted in 2018 and became only the third player to be drafted in the history of Fort Hays State. He became the first player to be drafted from Fort Hays State since Frankie Neal was selected by the Green Bay Packers in the third round (71st overall) of the 1987 NFL draft. On May 14, 2018, the Jets signed Shepherd to a four-year, $3.87 million contract that includes a signing bonus of $987,724.

External videos
- Jets draft Nathan Shepherd 72nd overall

Shepherd was suspended for six games for violating the NFL's performance-enhancing drugs policy on September 10, 2019. It was revealed that Shepherd underwent a sports hernia surgery in the off-season plus battling a shoulder issue and a herniated disc in his back. Shepherd confessed about using the PEDs in an effort to speed up his recovery, which eventually led to his suspension. He was reinstated from suspension on October 29, 2019, and was activated on November 1, 2019.

On March 16, 2022, Shepherd signed a one-year contract extension with the Jets.

=== New Orleans Saints ===
On March 17, 2023, Shepherd signed a three-year, $15 million contract with the New Orleans Saints. He ended the 2023 season with a career-best 50 tackles and 3.5 sacks. In 2024, during the Saints' Week 8 game against the Los Angeles Chargers, Shepherd attempted to sack Justin Herbert, failed, and fell to the ground. As Shepherd lay on the ground, he spends several seconds trying to bring the standing Herbert down by torquing his knee through an unnatural angle, despite the fact Herbert had shovel-passed the football before Shepherd had even hit the ground. Shepherd continued until Herbert was brought down and had to be pulled off by Charger's center Bradley Bozeman. Upon appeal the NFL rescinded his fine for the incident, as he claims to have not deliberately tried to injure Herbert during the play.

In Week 10 of the 2025 season, Shepherd blocked a field goal in the fourth quarter of a 17-7 win over the Carolina Panthers, earning NFC Special Teams Player of the Week.

== Career statistics ==
Legend
**Bold**	Career high

=== Regular season ===
Year	Team	Games		Tackles					Fumbles		
Year	Team	GP	GS	Cmb	Solo	Ast	Sck	TFL	FF	FR	Yds
2018	NYJ	16	5	15	5	10	0.0	1	0	0	0
2019	NYJ	9	0	11	6	5	2.0	**5**	0	0	0
2020	NYJ	14	3	17	8	9	2.5	3	0	0	0
2021	NYJ	17	1	28	17	11	0.0	0	0	0	0
2022	NYJ	17	3	33	16	17	1.5	4	0	0	0
2023	NO	17	17	**50**	**27**	23	**3.5**	4	0	0	0
2024	NO	16	13	37	16	21	1.5	3	0	0	0
2025	NO	16	8	47	23	**24**	3.0	4	**1**	0	0
Career		122	50	238	118	120	14	24	1	0	0
