= Echostage =

Music venue in the United States

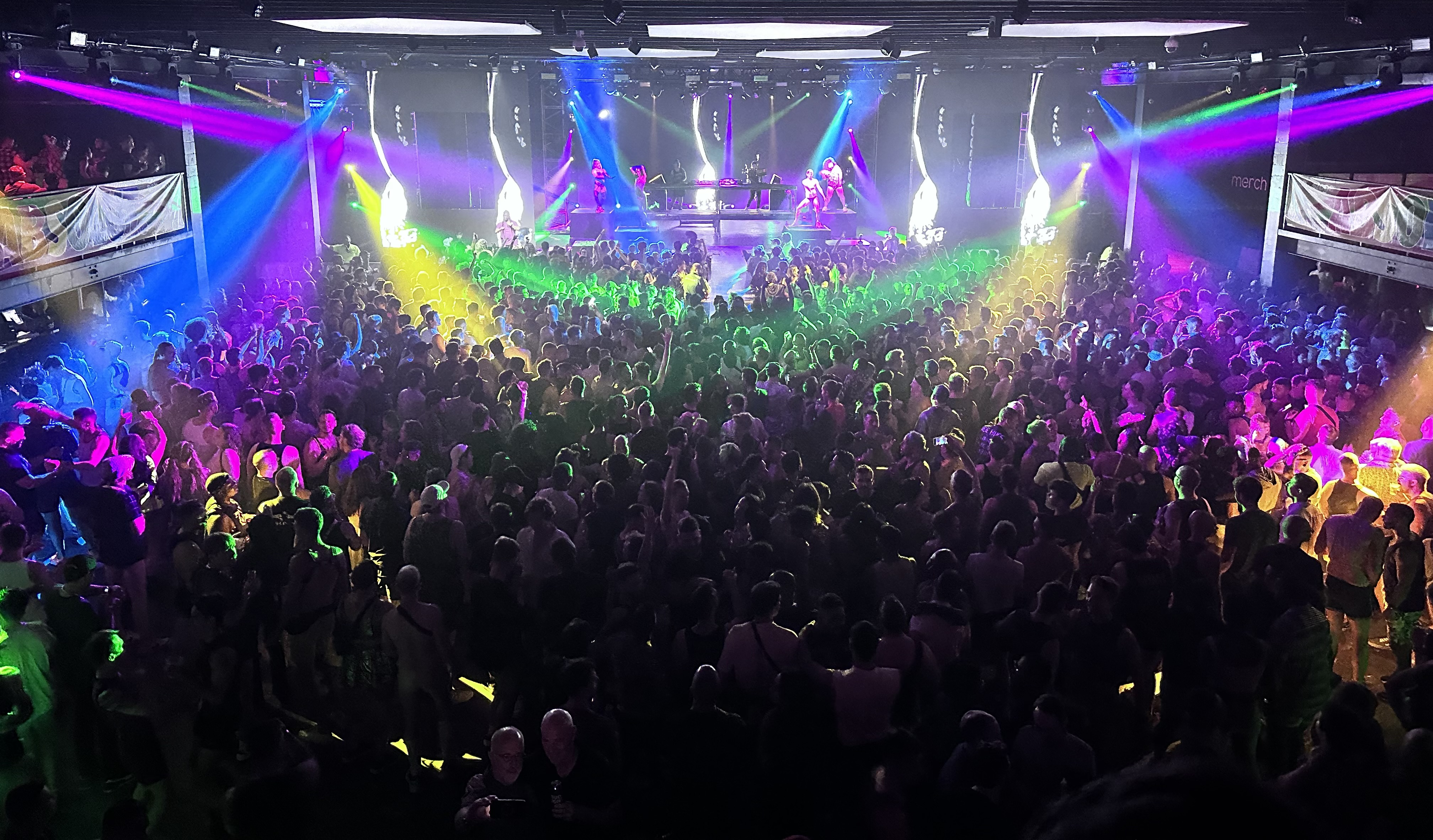
Echostage in 2024

Echostage is a music venue located in the Langdon neighborhood of Washington, D.C.

Opened in 2012, the hybrid nightclub and concert hall has over 30,000 square feet of space with a maximum capacity of 3,000 guests. Upon opening, it was the largest nightlife concert venue in D.C. (a distinction it held until The Anthem opened in 2017). The club is a venue for EDM and other dance music with performances by bands, singers, and DJs, including Tiësto, Avicii, Subtronics, Calvin Harris, Sexyy Red, Hardwell, David Guetta, and others. Echostage also hosts events for local law enforcement.

Events are managed by Club Glow, which subsequently opened Soundcheck in 2015, a smaller EDM venue located Downtown. The electronic music event promotion company Insomniac acquired Echostage in 2020, along with Club Glow and sister club Soundcheck.

The venue was voted the number one club in the world in the 2021 DJ Magazine reader's poll, having been annually ranked in the poll's top ten since 2017.

== Recognition ==
=== DJ Magazine Top 100 Clubs ===
Year	Position	Notes	Ref.
2013	38	New Entry	
2014	19	—N/a	
2015	18	—N/a	
2016	13	—N/a	
2017	8	—N/a	
2018	4	—N/a	
2019	2	—N/a	
2020	3	—N/a	
2021	1	—N/a	
2022	2	—N/a	
2023	4	—N/a	
2024	3	—N/a	
2025	5	—N/a	
