= Audiotistic Music Festival =

Music festival at the Shoreline Amphitheatre

- Genre: Electronic dance music, rap and hip hop, drum & bass, dubstep, etc.
- Locations: Southern California, USA Northern California, USA
- Years active: 1997 to 2003, 2009 to 2011, 2013-present
- Founders: Meelo Solis, Insomniac Events (recent owner)
- Website: Official website

Audiotistic Music Festival is a music festival that occurs annually in Northern California at the Shoreline Amphitheatre. Audiotistic is known for sporting a diverse assortment of genres, ranging from rap and hip hop to electronic genres drum & bass and dubstep. Previously, it was held in Southern California, US, from 1997 to 2003 and from 2009 to 2011, in various venues such as the National Orange Show Events Center in San Bernardino, the L.A. Sports Arena, and the Long Beach Convention and Entertainment Center. However, on July 15, 2017, the festival returned but this time to the Bay Area with two main stages. The festival would continue to expanding by adding an additional day in 2018.

== History ==
Audiotistic Music Festival began in 1997 from promoter Meelo Solis. He ran it with his brother Ben, and investment bankers Darin Feinstein and Bevan Cooney, with U.S. Concerts. It began as a mostly techno, strictly underground event. After failing to hold the event from 2004 to 2008, Solis teamed up with Insomniac CEO Pasquale Rotella to bring Audiotistic back to Southern California. The first Audiotistic Festival drew in 2,500 people. In 2001, the festival drew in 15,000; the next year it packed 35,000 into the National Orange Show Events Center. Despite the size of the crowd, police reported no incidents, and fans seemed remarkably controlled. By 2010, the festival was drawing in 25,000. The festival drew a smaller number in 2011 totaling 19,000 but was lauded as a success.

In 2002, in addition to its music lineup, Audiotistic tried to plug into Los Angeles skateboarding culture by erecting a makeshift skate park inside the Orange Center's pavilion that was free to use for anyone willing to lug their board along. The park was designed by pro skater Chad Muska, whose company, Circa Footwear, also hosted a $5,000 best trick contest at the event.

On November 20 and 21, 2021, the festival also took place for the first time in San Diego, California, at North Island Credit Union Amphitheatre.

== Controversies ==
Following the death of a 15-year-old girl at Insomniac's Electric Daisy Carnival in Los Angeles in 2010, Insomniac enacted a new 18 & over policy for all shows within the United States. Despite the increase in average age of attendees at the event, San Bernardino police still arrested more than two dozen partygoers. Twenty-one people were arrested on suspicion of felony drug and other offenses, and several more were arrested on suspicion of misdemeanor crimes, police said. Similarly, in 2011, 43 arrests were reported. Of those, 35 involved possession or sale of illegal narcotics, according to the police department.

On May 21, 2012, Rotella announced via Twitter that there would be no Audiotistic that summer, and that it would not come back until 2013.

== Line-ups ==
=== 2002 ===
Audiotistic featured OutKast, Kanye West and the Roots. Along with leading alternative hip hop artists such as Oakland's Blackalicious and Black Star, and turntablists including QBert and DJ Swamp, Audiotistic also showcased techno and its numerous offshoots. Other acts included Mos Def, King Britt, Talib Kweli, house DJ Roy Davis Jr., trance DJ Dan. On the drum-and-bass stage, Craze, DJ Markie and MC Skibadee warmed up the crowd for Roni Size and Dynamite with a blend of fast-paced beats and Jamaican dance-hall vocals.

=== 2003 ===
Headliners featured Nas, Big Boi (of OutKast) and the Chemical Brothers. Other acts included Talib Kweli, King Britt, Sandra Collins, Blackalicious and Donald Glaude. DJ King Britt delivered a mix of down-tempo, jazzy grooves, while hip hop act Blackalicious also stood out for its blend of funk hip-hop and positive beats.

=== 2009 ===
Progressive Orange Pavilion	Electro Citrus Building	Open Air Hip Hop Stage	Drum & Bass
David Delano & Modern Romance, Joaquin Bamaca, Lenny Vega, DJ Micro, Donald Glaude, Menno De Jone, Thrillseekers, Above & Beyond (live featuring Zoe Johnston)	Kuru, DJ Sin, Thee Mike B, Villains, DJ Funk, Flosstradamus, Junior Sanchez, Does It Offend You, Yeah? (DJ Set), Chromeo (live), Armand Van Helden, Le Castlevania, Kill The Noise	Peepshow, Far East Movement, Luckyiam, Them Jeans, Amanda Blank, The Cool Kids, Reflection Eternal (featuring Talib Kweli & DJ Hi-Tek), Z Trip, The Roots	Subflo, Hazen, Raw, AAron Lacrate, Shimon, Mike Relm, Goldie, Ed Rush & Optical, Lemonde and Dillinja

=== 2010 ===
The Boombox	Speaker Temple	Sound Arcade	Bass Frequency
DJ Sin, Eskmo, The Cool Kids, N.A.S.A., Talib Tweli, Nick Catchdubs, Bassnectar, Kid Cudi, Rusko, Daedelus, Nosaj Thing	Lenny V., Sonic C, Chris Lake, Donald Glaude & Kill The Noise, Wippenberg, Cosmic Gate, Marco V	We A.R.E., Dances With White Girls, Flosstradamus, AC Slater, Harvard Bass, Riva Starr, A-Trak, Treasure Fingers	Dumbsteppaz, Camo UFO's, Star Eyes, Breakage, Craze, Nero, Ed Rush & Optical, TC

=== 2011 ===
Wolfgang Gartner filled in for Sebastian Ingrosso, who had to cancel his Audiotistic appearance at the last minute, due to him needing to receive minor surgery.

Treble Frequency	Speaker Temple	Bass Frequency	The Boombox
Crunch Theory, Zoo Brazil, Morten Breum, Bobby Burns, Bingo Players, Chris Lake, Porter Robinson, Flux Pavilion & Doctor P, Diplo, Crystal Castles, Wolfgang Gartner	Norin & Rad, Menno De Jong, Marcel Woods, Jaytech, Mat Zo, Arty, Super8 & Tab, Showtek	Deco, Fury, Flinch, Plastician, Ed Rush & Optical, Lazaro Casanova, Bobby Burns, Benga, Datsik, DJ Fresh	DJ Sin, King Fantastic, Thee Mike B, Araabmuzik, Nick Catchdubs, Hoodie Allen, Chiddy Bang, AC Slater, Daedelus, The Cool Kids, Craze, Lil B, Major Lazer

=== 2017 ===
Audiotistic came to the Bay Area for the first time on July 15, 2017, at the Shoreline Amphitheatre. It featured two main stages Frequency 1.1 and Frequency 2.2.

Frequency 1.1	Frequency 2.2
Marshmello, Flosstradamus, Lil Uzi Vert, Nghtmre, Slander, Ghastly, Habstrakt	Dj Dials, Keys N Krates (live), Joyryde, Playboi Carti, Point Point, Dombresky, Anglez, Young Nudy

=== 2018 ===
Audiotistic returns to the Shoreline Amphitheater but this time with a two day event on July 14 & 15th.

Frequency 1.1	Frequency 2.2
4B, Born Dirty, Cray, Drezo, Jai Wolf, Joyryde, Kaskade, Kayzo, Lil Wayne, Loudpvck, Louis The Child, Quix, Rezz, Rich The Kid + Famous Dex, Virtual Self, Whipped Cream	Dombresky, Ekali, GG MAGREE, Habstrakt, Judge, K?D, Lil Skies, Medasin, Nghtmre b2b Slander, Nitti Gritti, Party Favor, Phantoms (Dj Set), Ray Volpe, Saymyname, Shiba San, Slushii

== See also ==
- List of electronic music festivals
