= Okeechobee High School =

Public high school in Okeechobee County, Florida, United States

Location
- 610 SW 2nd Ave; Okeechobee, Florida 34972; United States
- 27.2376908°N 80.8318545°W

Information
- School district: Okeechobee County School District
- NCES District ID: 1201410
- Superintendent: Dylan Tedders
- CEEB code: 101270
- NCES School ID: 120141001358
- Principal: Christina Norman
- Teaching staff: 83.53 (FTE)
- Grades: 9-12
- Age range: 15-18
- Enrollment: 1,741 (2023-2024)
- Student to teacher ratio: 20.84
- Language: English, Spanish
- Hours in school day: Seven
- Campus type: Rural
- Colors: Deep purple and old gold
- Mascot: Brahman Bull
- Team name: Brahmans
- Newspaper: Purple & Gold Newsletter
- Website: https://www.okeeschools.org/o/ohs

Okeechobee High School is a public high school for grades 9–12 in Okeechobee County, Florida, United States.

The school belongs to the Okeechobee County School District.

== Notable alumni ==
- Gene Harris (1982), former MLB pitcher
- Frankie Neal (1983), former NFL wide receiver
- Jimmie Jones (1984), former NFL defensive tackle
- Reggie Rembert (1984), former NFL wide receiver
- Kulsoom Abdullah (1994), weightlifter
- Lonnie Pryor (2008), former NFL fullback
- Jonathon Crawford (2009), former MLB draft first round pick
- Kutter Crawford (2014), pitcher for the Boston Red Sox
- Mason Adams (2018), pitcher in the Chicago White Sox organization
- Evan Neal (2019), offensive lineman for the New York Giants

== See also ==
- List of high schools in Florida
- Okeechobee High School (1925), original building, still in use as Okeechobee Freshman Campus
