= Under the Electric Sky =

EDC 2013: Under the Electric Sky
- Film poster
- Directed by: Dan Cutforth; Jane Lipsitz
- Produced by: Kevin Mann; Rachel Miller
- Cinematography: Reed Smoot
- Edited by: Steve Lichtenstein; Dava Whisenant
- Music by: Kaskade
- Production companies: Haven Entertainment; Insomniac Events
- Distributed by: Focus Features
- Release dates: January 18, 2014 (Sundance); May 29, 2014 (United States)
- Running time: 85 minutes
- Country: United States
- Language: English

EDC 2013: Under the Electric Sky is an American musical documentary film co-directed by Dan Cutforth and Jane Lipsitz. The film also features Pasquale Rotella, producer of the Electric Daisy Carnival.

The film had its world premiere at 2014 Sundance Film Festival on January 18, 2014. The film later screened at Sundance London Film Festival on April 25, 2014.

Focus Features acquired the distribution rights of the film.

== Synopsis ==
The film chronicles the community and life of festival-goers during Electric Daisy Carnival in Las Vegas, the largest dance and music festival held in the US.

== Reception ==
EDC 2013: Under the Electric Sky received mixed reviews from critics. Justin Lowe in his review for The Hollywood Reporter praised the film by saying that "Colorful 3D eye candy provides minimal cinematic nourishment." Katie Hasty of HitFix, praised the film by saying that "For electronic and dance music lovers, that storyline may hit the spot, especially with the non-stop throb and the colorful scenery. There is no competing version, which is “Under the Electric Sky’s” triumph, and also its problem." Dennis Harvey in his review for Variety said that "Those who suspect that EDM is possibly the most vapid form of 'alternative' music will have their suspicions confirmed by this 3D documentary."
