= Okeechobee, Florida =

- City
- City of Okeechobee
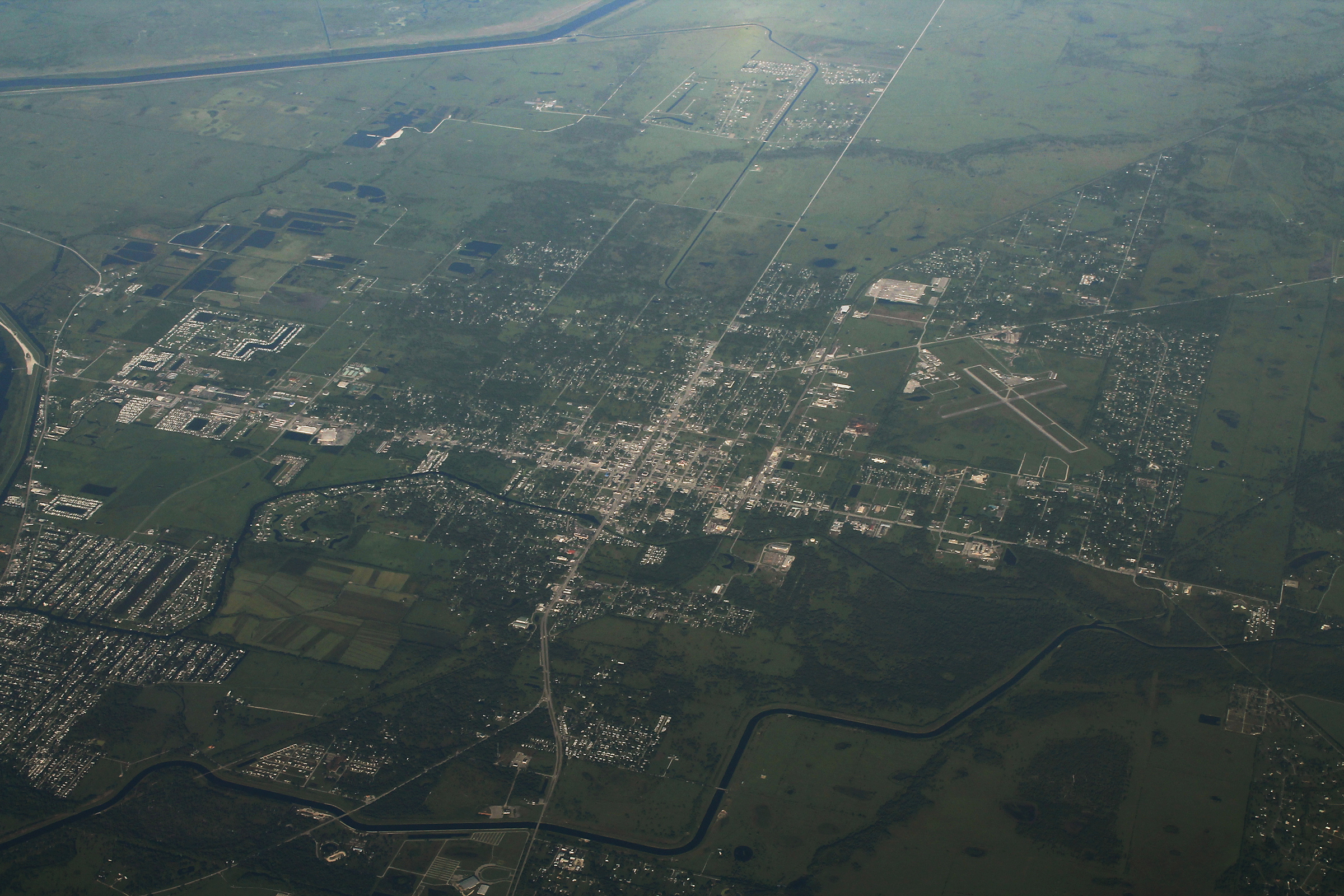
- Aerial view of the city in 2013

- Seal

- Location in Okeechobee County and the state of Florida
- Coordinates: 27°14′48″N 80°49′49″W
- Country: United States
- State: Florida
- County: Okeechobee
- Incorporated: June 4, 1915

Government
  - Type: Mayor-Council

Area
  - Total: 4.15 sq mi (10.76 km^{2})
  - Land: 4.05 sq mi (10.50 km^{2})
  - Water: 0.097 sq mi (0.25 km^{2}) 0.96%
- Elevation: 26 ft (7.9 m)

Population (2020)
  - Total: 5,254
  - Density: 1,296/sq mi (500.2/km^{2})
- Time zone: UTC−5 (Eastern (EST))
  - Summer (DST): UTC−4 (EDT)
- ZIP codes: 34972-34974
- Area code: 863
- FIPS code: 12-51200
- GNIS feature ID: 2404424
- Website: http://www.cityofokeechobee.com

Okeechobee (US: /oʊkiˈtʃoʊbi/ OH-kee-CHOH-bee) is a city in and the county seat of Okeechobee County, Florida, United States. As of the 2020 US census, the city's population was 5,254.

Okeechobee is served by the Okeechobee County Airport.

== History ==
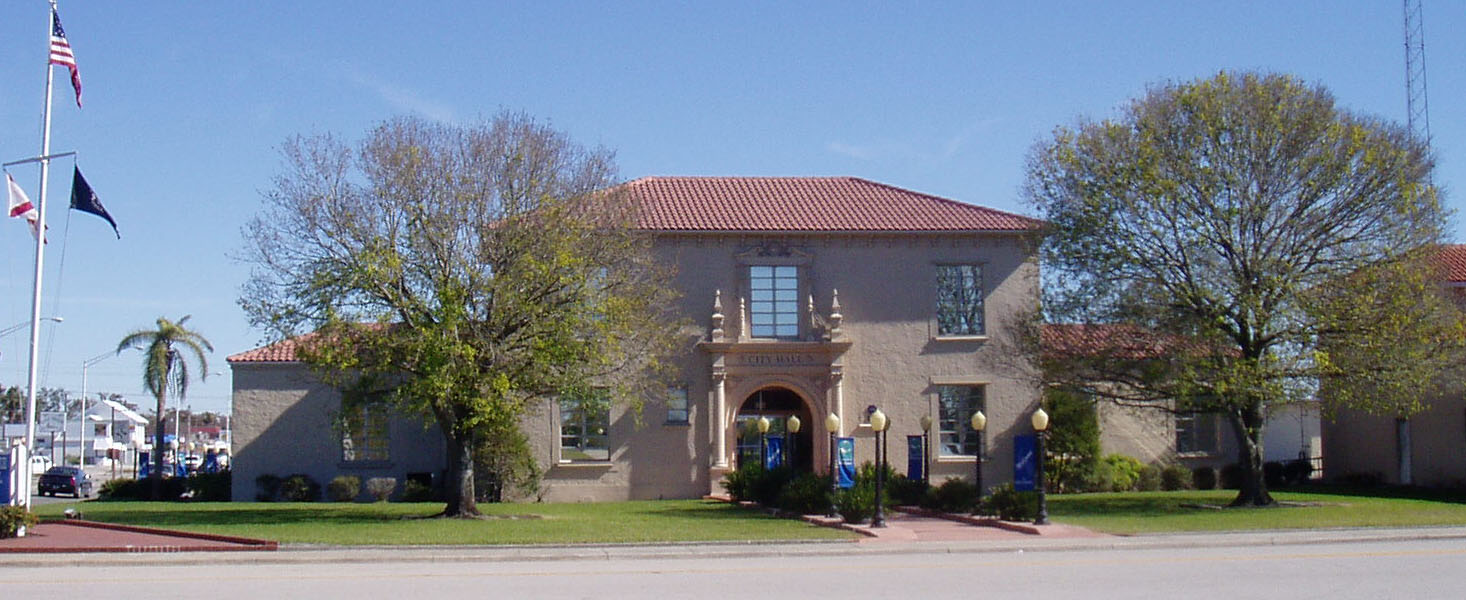
The city hall of the town

Okeechobee is close to the site of the Battle of Lake Okeechobee, a major battle of the Second Seminole War, fought between forces under the command of Zachary Taylor and Seminole warriors resisting forced removal to Indian Territory west of the Mississippi River in the 1830s. (This territory was later admitted as the state of Oklahoma in 1907.)

The Lake Okeechobee area was severely damaged in the 1928 Okeechobee Hurricane, the first recorded Category 5 hurricane in the North Atlantic. This was one of the deadliest hurricanes ever to strike the US.

From 1918 to 1929, the international drink company Coca-Cola had a plant to bottle their drinks in Okeechobee in the current location of Jersey Mike's Subs. Damages sustained from the 1928 Okeechobee Hurricane was the primary reason they stopped bottling in Okeechobee.

In the 1930s, Okeechobee was the commercial center for the surrounding area, shipping hundreds of train cars of winter vegetables annually. It had poultry farms, a catfish shipping plant, and a bullfrog breeding industry.

The Florida guide described bullfrog breeding in the Okeechobee region:

Frog legs, or 'saddles,' bring high prices in the winter when frogs usually hibernate and are difficult to capture. Frog farmers enclose bottom lands, ponds, or swamps; as frogs live on insects, breeders strew the runs with rotting meat to attract blowflies. Some plant flowers and shrubs to lure bugs, and occasionally install electric lights to attract moths, beetles, and other nocturnal insects. A female frog lays from 10 to 30 thousand eggs a year; tadpoles appear from 60 to 90 days later, but frogs are seldom marketed before they are two years old.

— Federal Writers'Project, "Part III: The Florida Loop", Florida: A Guide to the Southernmost State (1947)

Lakefront Estates, a planned Orthodox Jewish community, is currently under construction on a 550-acre site in Okeechobee.

== Geography ==
Okeechobee is located just north of Lake Okeechobee. Taylor Creek flows through the east side of the town. The area is served by US routes 98 and 441 and state routes 70, 700 and 15.

According to the United States Census Bureau, the city has a total area of 4.2 square miles (11 km^{2}), of which 4.1 square miles (11 km^{2}) is land and 0.04 square miles (0.10 km^{2}) (0.96%) is water.

=== Climate ===
Okeechobee has a humid subtropical climate (Cfa), with hot, humid summers and warm, drier winters.

Climate data for Okeechobee, Florida, 1991–2020 normals, extremes 1945–2011
Month	Jan	Feb	Mar	Apr	May	Jun	Jul	Aug	Sep	Oct	Nov	Dec	Year
Record high °F (°C)	87 (31)	87 (31)	94 (34)	97 (36)	100 (38)	100 (38)	101 (38)	101 (38)	99 (37)	98 (37)	91 (33)	89 (32)	101 (38)
Mean maximum °F (°C)	83.0 (28.3)	84.3 (29.1)	87.1 (30.6)	90.1 (32.3)	93.6 (34.2)	95.3 (35.2)	96.7 (35.9)	96.5 (35.8)	94.7 (34.8)	92.0 (33.3)	87.0 (30.6)	83.7 (28.7)	97.8 (36.6)
Mean daily maximum °F (°C)	74.4 (23.6)	76.9 (24.9)	82.3 (27.9)	84.4 (29.1)	88.5 (31.4)	90.3 (32.4)	92.0 (33.3)	91.9 (33.3)	90.1 (32.3)	86.2 (30.1)	80.3 (26.8)	75.9 (24.4)	84.4 (29.1)
Daily mean °F (°C)	63.2 (17.3)	65.8 (18.8)	70.5 (21.4)	74.2 (23.4)	78.3 (25.7)	81.8 (27.7)	83.3 (28.5)	83.4 (28.6)	81.8 (27.7)	77.0 (25.0)	70.2 (21.2)	65.4 (18.6)	74.6 (23.7)
Mean daily minimum °F (°C)	52.1 (11.2)	54.8 (12.7)	58.7 (14.8)	64.0 (17.8)	68.1 (20.1)	73.2 (22.9)	74.5 (23.6)	74.8 (23.8)	73.5 (23.1)	67.8 (19.9)	60.1 (15.6)	55.0 (12.8)	64.7 (18.2)
Mean minimum °F (°C)	33.8 (1.0)	37.3 (2.9)	41.9 (5.5)	48.6 (9.2)	58.6 (14.8)	67.0 (19.4)	69.4 (20.8)	70.5 (21.4)	67.6 (19.8)	54.6 (12.6)	45.3 (7.4)	36.9 (2.7)	30.9 (−0.6)
Record low °F (°C)	16 (−9)	26 (−3)	29 (−2)	37 (3)	49 (9)	54 (12)	63 (17)	65 (18)	60 (16)	41 (5)	33 (1)	20 (−7)	16 (−9)
Average precipitation inches (mm)	2.47 (63)	2.12 (54)	2.96 (75)	2.86 (73)	4.15 (105)	7.28 (185)	5.90 (150)	7.31 (186)	7.23 (184)	3.80 (97)	1.89 (48)	2.33 (59)	50.30 (1,278)
Average precipitation days (≥ 0.01 in)	6.1	6.3	6.2	5.6	7.3	15.8	13.2	13.7	13.6	7.2	4.9	6.8	106.7
Source: NOAA (mean maxima/minima 1981–2010)

== Demographics ==
Historical population
Census	Pop.	Note	%±
1920	900		—
1930	1,795		99.4%
1940	1,658		−7.6%
1950	1,849		11.5%
1960	2,947		59.4%
1970	3,715		26.1%
1980	4,225		13.7%
1990	4,943		17.0%
2000	5,376		8.8%
2010	5,621		4.6%
2020	5,254		−6.5%
U.S. Decennial Census

=== Racial and ethnic composition ===
Okeechobee racial composition (Hispanics excluded from racial categories) (NH = Non-Hispanic)
Race	Pop 2010	Pop 2020	% 2010	% 2020
White (NH)	3,524	3,196	62.69%	60.83%
Black or African American (NH)	496	502	8.82%	9.55%
Native American or Alaska Native (NH)	58	40	1.03%	0.76%
Asian (NH)	46	71	0.82%	1.35%
Pacific Islander or Native Hawaiian (NH)	2	2	0.04%	0.04%
Some other race (NH)	7	18	0.12%	0.34%
Two or more races/Multiracial (NH)	70	165	1.25%	3.14%
Hispanic or Latino (any race)	1,418	1,260	25.23%	23.98%
Total	5,621	5,254		

=== 2020 census ===
As of the 2020 census, Okeechobee had a population of 5,254. The median age was 40.1 years. 23.1% of residents were under the age of 18 and 20.8% of residents were 65 years of age or older. For every 100 females there were 92.6 males, and for every 100 females age 18 and over there were 89.9 males age 18 and over.

99.8% of residents lived in urban areas, while 0.2% lived in rural areas.

There were 1,962 households in Okeechobee, of which 35.9% had children under the age of 18 living in them. Of all households, 42.5% were married-couple households, 17.8% were households with a male householder and no spouse or partner present, and 30.7% were households with a female householder and no spouse or partner present. About 25.7% of all households were made up of individuals and 13.8% had someone living alone who was 65 years of age or older.

There were 2,257 housing units, of which 13.1% were vacant. The homeowner vacancy rate was 2.7% and the rental vacancy rate was 9.6%.

In 2020, there were 1,316 families residing in the city.

=== Demographic estimates ===
Of the city's population in 2020, 6.7% were under 5 years old. 47.7% of the population was female. There were 383 veterans living in the city and 14% of residents were foreign-born persons.

In 2020, the median household income was $40,149 with a per capita income of $21,449. 21.8% of the population lived below the poverty threshold.

=== 2010 census ===
As of the 2010 United States census, there were 5,621 people, 1,839 households, and 1,152 families residing in the city.

== Education ==
The sole school district in the county is Okeechobee County School District.

== Points of interest ==
On 25 December 1837, Lake Okeechobee became the site of an important battle in the Second Seminole War, fought between a number of Seminole Native American groups, the United States government, and allied militias. The battlefield is now the site of a 145-acre (0.59 km^{2}) park, and annual reenactments.

In 2016, the Okeechobee Music & Arts Festival was organized for the first time. This multi-day, multi-genre music festival attracted approximately 30,000 people to the city in its first year.

== Notable people ==
- Janet Bonnema, civil engineer
- Kutter Crawford, MLB baseball player
- Evan Neal, NFL football player
- Lonnie Pryor, NFL football player
- Reggie Rembert, NFL football player
- Thomas Rooney, U.S. House of Representatives, Florida's 17th congressional district
- Gerald Solomon, New York U.S. House of Representatives
