= Frankie Neal =

American football player (born 1965)

No. 80
- Position: Wide receiver

Personal information
- Born: October 1, 1965 (age 61); Sebring, Florida, U.S.
- Listed height: 6 ft 1 in (1.85 m)
- Listed weight: 202 lb (92 kg)

Career information
- High school: Okeechobee (FL)
- College: Florida; Fort Hays State
- NFL draft: 1987: 3rd round, 71st overall pick

Career history
- Green Bay Packers (1987)

Awards and highlights
- PFWA All-Rookie Team (1987)

Career NFL statistics
- Receptions: 36
- Receiving yards: 420
- Touchdowns: 3
- Stats at Pro Football Reference

Frankie Leon Neal (born October 1, 1965) is an American former professional football player who was a wide receiver in the National Football League (NFL) for a single season in 1987. Neal played college football for University of Florida and Fort Hays State University, and thereafter, he played professionally for the Green Bay Packers of the NFL. He was released by the Packers after one season and subsequently was arrested multiple times.

== Early life ==
Neal was born in Sebring, Florida. He attended Okeechobee High School in Okeechobee, Florida, where he played high school football for the Okeechobee Brahmans.

== College career ==
Neal attended the University of Florida in Gainesville, Florida, where he played for coach Charley Pell and coach Galen Hall's Florida Gators football teams from 1983 to 1985. Memorably, Neal was part of one of the ten greatest pass plays in Gators football history when he caught a pass from quarterback Kerwin Bell to go eighty-two yards from scrimmage for a touchdown against the Florida State Seminoles in 1985. He finished the 1985 season with twenty receptions for 487 yards, which is still the Gators' single-season record for most yards per catch (24.4 yards).

== Professional career ==
The Green Bay Packers selected Neal in the third round of the 1987 NFL draft. He played for the Packers during the 1987 season. He finished his rookie season as a pro with thirty-six receptions for 420 yards and three touchdowns.

== See also ==
- Florida Gators football, 1980–89
- List of Fort Hays State Tigers in the NFL draft
