= Electric Daisy Carnival =

Largest electronic dance music festival in the world

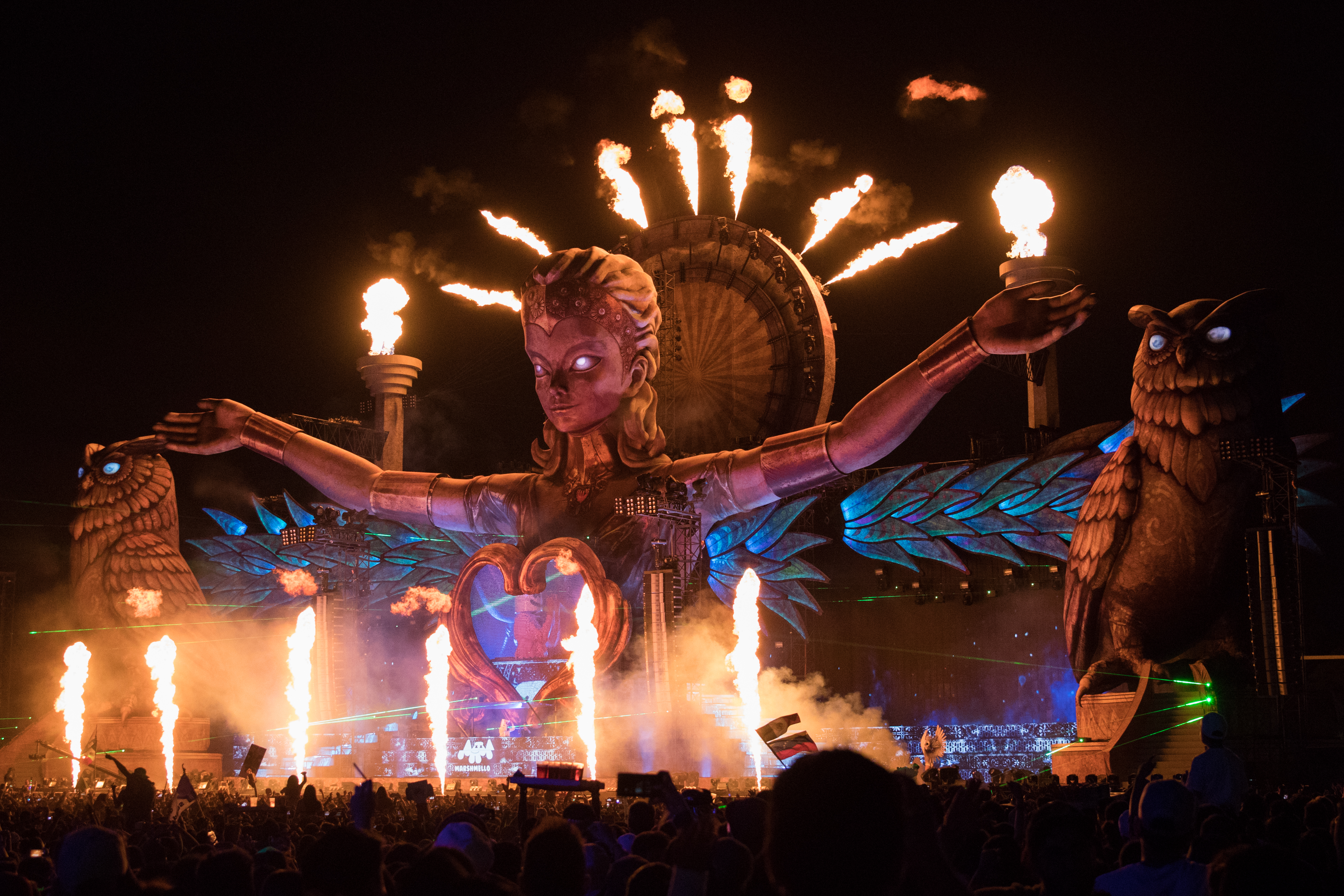
- Marshmello playing the main stage of EDC Mexico in 2018
- Genre: Electronic dance music
- Date: EDC Las Vegas: May 15–17 (2026)
- Locations: Flagship: Las Vegas, Nevada; Other locations: Orlando, Florida; Mexico City, Mexico; Medellín, Colombia; Suzhou, China; Phuket, Thailand; Seoul, South Korea
- Years active: 1991–1993 (first incarnation); 1997–present (Insomniac)
- Attendance: 500,000 (2026, 3 days total)
- Capacity: 175,000 (all stages combined)
- Website: electricdaisycarnival.com

The Electric Daisy Carnival, commonly known as EDC, is a major electronic dance music festival organized by promoter and distributor Insomniac. The annual flagship event, EDC Las Vegas, is held in May at the Las Vegas Motor Speedway and is the largest electronic dance music festival worldwide, with over 500,000 people attending the 3-day festival each year.

The event incorporates a variety of electronic music producers and DJs, which are spread across nine stages and roaming art cars; traditionally, the Las Vegas edition has operated under a dusk-to-dawn schedule, with lineups beginning in the late-evening, and concluding at sunrise the following morning on each day. The festival grounds also include various art installations and other attractions, including carnival entertainers and amusement rides.

Since its inception, other EDC events have been held in other states and abroad, including Mexico, Puerto Rico, the UK, Brazil, Japan and India. As of 2026, EDC is held annually in Las Vegas and Orlando, along with international editions in China, Colombia, Mexico, South Korea, and Thailand.

In 2009, EDC became a two-day event, and in 2011, a three-day event. In 2018, EDC Las Vegas expanded the festival to include an on-site camping experience. The festival features nine stages, each catering to different genres of EDM, with its largest, Kinetic Field, being able to accommodate 70,000 people for headliners. It also has 18 carnival rides, four Ferris wheels, and over 5,000 staff members. In 2019, access to purchasing tickets to EDC was expanded to mobile phone apps for convenience. In 2017, EDC won the Festival of the Year award at the Electronic Music Awards. In 2023, the festival had a record attendance of 525,000 people over three days. Starting in 2027, the festival will expand to two weekends.

== History ==
=== 1986–1999 ===
The Electric Daisy Carnival had its roots in 1986, when Stephen Hauptfuhr first started throwing underground parties. He organised the first Electric Daisy Carnival in 1991 in Chino, California. It had an outdoor carnival and drew 3,500 people who were impressed by the carnival atmosphere. He subsequently organised the 1992 and 1995 editions as well.

Philip Blaine—Pasquale's partner—made the deal to grant use of the name Electric Daisy Carnival in 1995 to Pasqualle Rotella CEO of Insomniac Events. Between 1995 and EDC, Philip and Pasquale created the now legendary Organic '96 event.

Insomniac debuted their signature event, Electric Daisy Carnival, in 1997 at the Shrine Expo Hall in Los Angeles, California.

In 1999, Electric Daisy Carnival took place at Lake Dolores Waterpark in Newberry Springs, California.

=== 2000–2009 ===
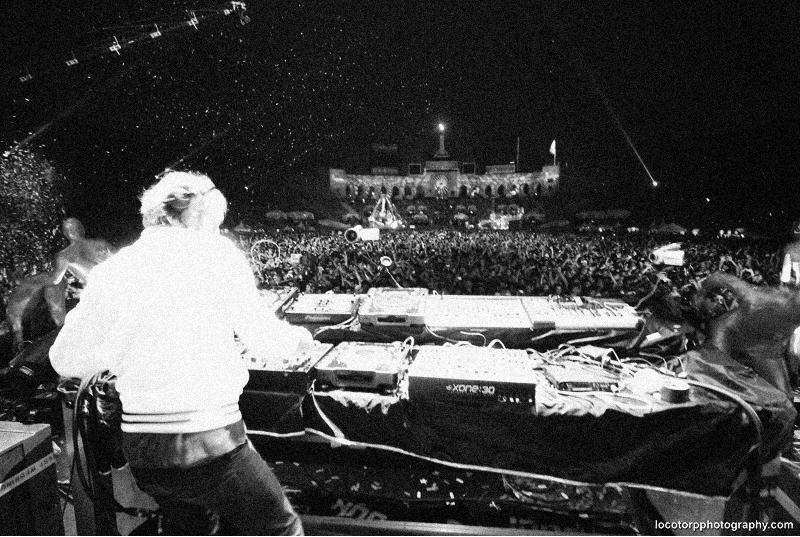
Benny Benassi at EDC Los Angeles 2009

In 2000, the Electric Daisy Carnival was held at the International Agri-Center in Tulare, California, attracting 24,000 attendees as well as complaints about noise. The International Agri-Center subsequently cancelled its contract to host subsequent editions of the Electric Daisy Carnival.

In 2001, Electric Daisy Carnival was held at Hansen Dam in Southern California, expanding for the first time to multiple stages: the Merry Go Round, the Fun House, Clown Alley, the Confusin' & Amuzin' Mirror Maze, Bassrush Arena and Cosmic Healing Temple. In the same year, the first EDC Texas was held at the Thunderhill Raceway Park in Austin, Texas.

EDC 2002 was held at Queen Mary Events Park in Long Beach, California. A second edition was planned to be held at the Travis County Exposition Center in Austin, Texas, but the venue cancelled in the days before an event. A make-up show with a different line-up was held a week later for anyone who did not just get a refund.

From 2003 to 2006, Electric Daisy Carnival was held at the NOS Events Center in San Bernardino, California.

In 2007, Electric Daisy Carnival was held at the Los Angeles Memorial Coliseum in Los Angeles' Exposition Park.

In 2008, The California event was held June 28 at the Los Angeles Memorial Coliseum and Exposition Park. The EDC Colorado event took place on June 14 at the Arapahoe County Fairgrounds in Aurora.

At the Nocturnal Festival in 2008, EDC revealed its plan to host a two-day festival in California. The event was held June 26–27. On Friday, approximately 55,000 attendees were present and Saturday saw a crowd of approximately 99,000. EDC 2009 was held at the Los Angeles Memorial Coliseum and used the entire southern half of Exposition Park. The Colorado event was held at the Arapahoe County Fairgrounds in Aurora on June 13. It was headlined by Infected Mushroom, Paul Van Dyk, and several others. The first EDC Puerto Rico was held in 2009 at the Arena Fairgrounds in San Juan, on August 14.

=== 2010–2019 ===
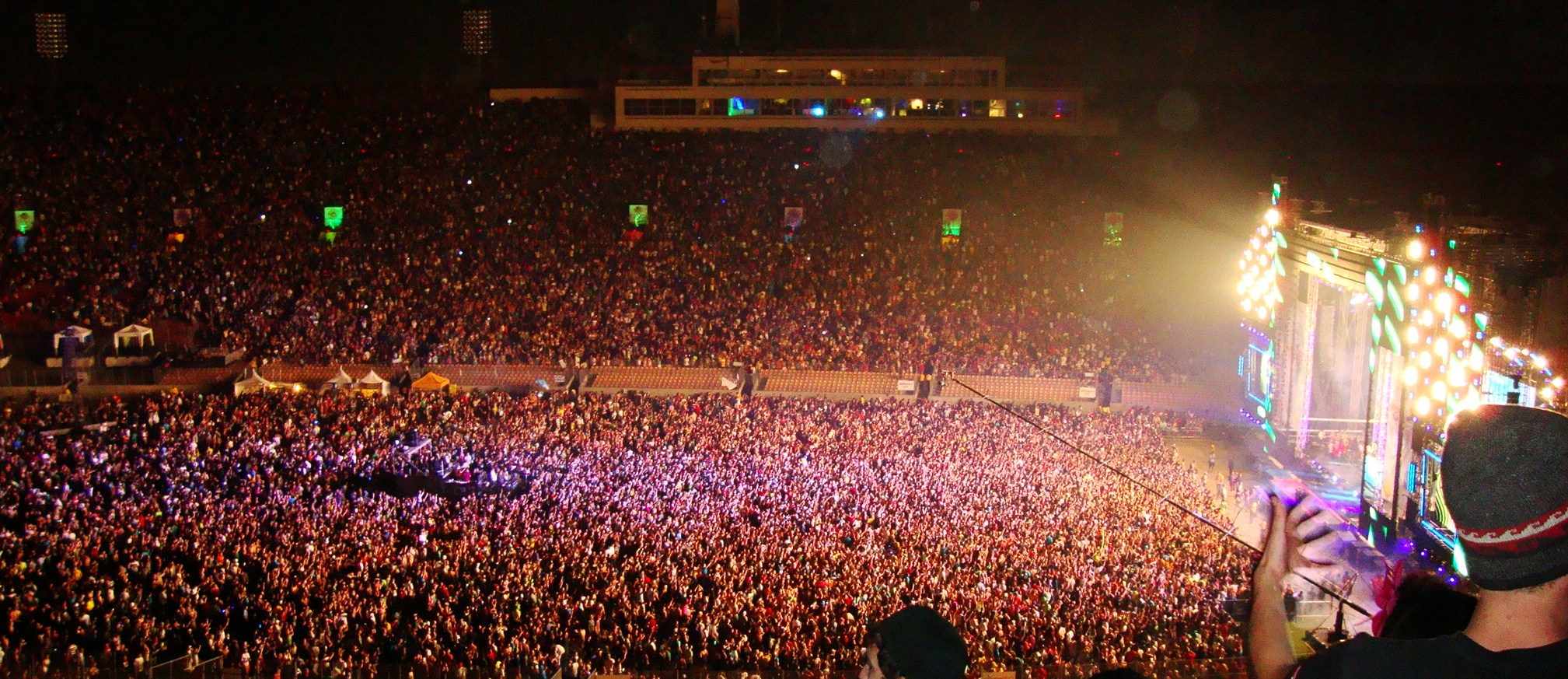
EDC Los Angeles, 2010

EDC Los Angeles had an attendance of about 185,000 people. Though tickets were starting at $60, some attendees paid over $100 per ticket. It drew criticism from local authorities and promoters after people under the required age of 16 gained entrance, and more than 100 ravers were hospitalized after a crowd stampede. A 15-year-old attendee, Sasha Rodriguez, died after taking MDMA, a psychoactive drug. The city of Los Angeles placed a suspension on all remaining events scheduled for 2010 and for future events, pending the outcome of the new security and safety provisions. The new provisions included the hiring of on-site doctors, and stated attendees must be over 18 years of age. An EDC Colorado event was held on June 12 at the Arapahoe County Fairground in Aurora. EDC Dallas was held on June 19 at Fair Park in Dallas. 11,000 people were in attendance. EDC Puerto Rico was held on August 28, 2010, at the Estadio Sixto Escobar at Puerta de Tierra, San Juan.

In 2011, due to the previous controversy of EDC's former residence in Los Angeles, EDC moved its flagship festival to Las Vegas, Nevada. The event was held at the Las Vegas Motor Speedway from June 24–26. Reportedly 230,000 people had attended the 3 day festival. EDC Orlando 2011 was held May 27–28 at Tinker Field, and the grounds adjacent to the Florida Citrus Bowl. EDC Orlando 2011 had approximately 12,000 on Friday and 20,000 on Saturday. EDC Colorado the same year was held at the Arapahoe County Fairgrounds in Aurora on June 11. Electric Daisy Carnival Dallas was held June 18 at Fair Park with an estimated 25,000 attendees. Temperatures above 110 degrees led to dozens of hospitalizations and at least one death, which made it the last EDC held in Dallas. EDC Puerto Rico took place in San Juan at the Estadio Sixto Escobar on August 27

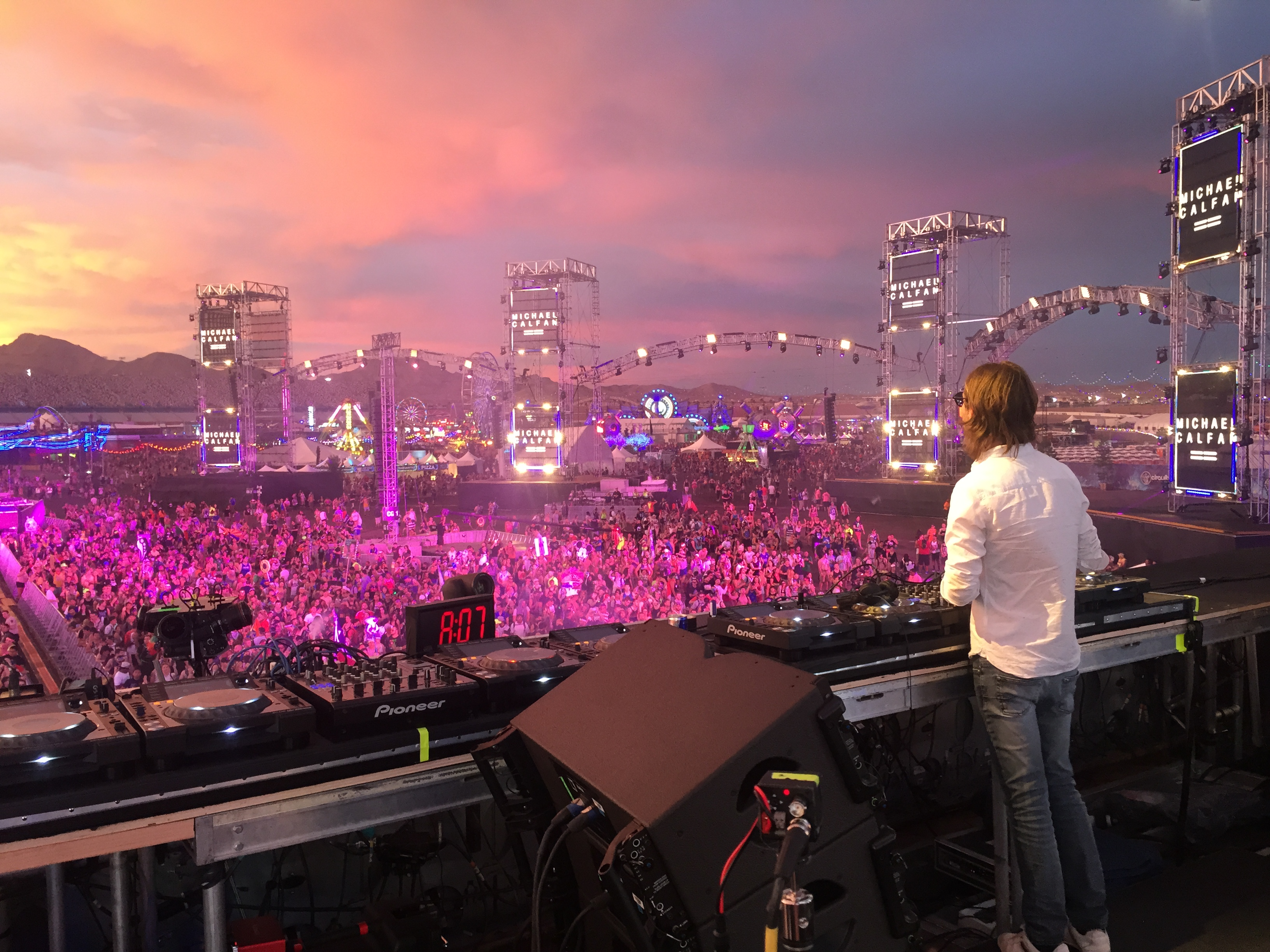
Michael Calfan at EDC Las Vegas 2016

In 2012, the three-day EDC in Vegas (June 8–10) saw attendance increase by 30%, to a total of 320,000 attendees. A 31-year-old male from Florida died after being struck by a truck as he left EDC at the Las Vegas Motor Speedway on June 11. Friends reported that he had been drinking and smoking. The second night had to shut down early at 1 a.m. due to high winds, of up to 30 MPH that started around 8 p.m. 90,000 fans were directed to the speedway's bleachers. DJs Markus Schulz and Steve Aoki, who were both scheduled to play that night, performed impromptu sets on the Insomniac Wide Awake art car, a much smaller, mobile stage, for a short period, before officials ordered it to close as potentially dangerous winds were expected until 5 a.m. In order to make up for the cancellation, Insomniac allowed those with Saturday passes to return on Sunday. EDC Orlando was held at Tinker Field on November 9–10. This coincided with the annual Dayglow event in Fort Lauderdale, Florida, called "Dancegiving" held the weekend after Thanksgiving. EDC New York was held May 18–20 at the MetLife Stadium at the Meadowlands Sports Complex in East Rutherford, New Jersey. Although the venue was located in New Jersey, the festival was coined Electric Daisy Carnival New York due to the proximity to New York City. The event drew 45,000 attendees per day.

In 2013, EDC Las Vegas was held June 21–23. EDC was held in London for the first time, along with events in Chicago, New York, San Juan, Puerto Rico, and Orlando, Florida.

In 2014, EDC was held at the Las Vegas Motor Speedway on June 20–22, 2014. Insomniac Events announced that all 345,000 tickets to the three-day festival had been sold by June 18, 2014. At the conclusion of the 2014 event, the massive three-day festival drew in roughly 134,000 per day. The setup at the event also led Insomniac to set the record for the largest structural stage in North America. EDC events were also held in Milton Keynes, England, San Juan, Orlando, Florida, and New York. The first EDC Mexico was held March 15–16, 2014. A documentary film called Under the Electric Sky about the festival premiered at the 2014 Sundance Film Festival.

EDC Las Vegas 2015 was held in Las Vegas, Nevada, at the Las Vegas Motor Speedway on June 19, 20 & 21. Its stage featured a blinking owl as background theme. EDC Las Vegas 2015 was met with unwanted publicity for the death of a UC Irvine graduate on the second night of the festival. Death was ruled as related to MDMA, which has side effects of dehydration and increase in body temperature. EDC was also held at Orlando, Florida at Tinker Field on November 6 & 7, and East Rutherford, New Jersey at MetLife Stadium on May 23 & 24. Internationally, EDC was held at Estadio Sixto Escobar in San Juan, Puerto Rico for the sixth time on February 21 & 22, Autódromo José Carlos Pace in São Paulo, Brazil for the first time December 4 & 5, Autódromo Hermanos Rodríguez in Mexico City, Mexico for the second time on February 28 – March 1, and the National Bowl in Milton Keynes, UK for the third time on July 17.

In 2016, EDC Las Vegas was held at Las Vegas Motor Speedway from June 17–19. The event saw DJ Marshmello removing his helmet in a gimmick to be the DJ Tiësto. EDC Mexico was held for the third time at Autódromo Hermanos Rodríguez in Mexico City, from February 27–28, 2016. EDC New York was held at Citi Field in Queens, NY, from May 14–15, 2016. EDC UK was held at Milton Keynes, England on 9 July 2016. EDC Orlando was held at Tinker Field in Orlando, Florida, from November 4–5, 2016. EDC India was held at Buddh International Circuit in New Delhi, India, from November 12–13, 2016.

In 2017, EDC returned to the Las Vegas Motor Speedway from June, with over 135,000 attendees on opening night. Heat-related health incidents saw a significant increase, with double the medical-related calls on opening night year-over-year. A 34-year-old man died after taking MDMA and TFMPP, a drug similar to MDMA, with heat exposure as a contributing factor. EDC was held for the fourth time in Mexico City at Autódromo Hermanos Rodríguez from 25 to 26 February. EDC UK 2017, due to be held at Milton Keynes, England in July 2017, was cancelled. EDC Orlando 2017 was held at Tinker Field on November 10–11, 2017.

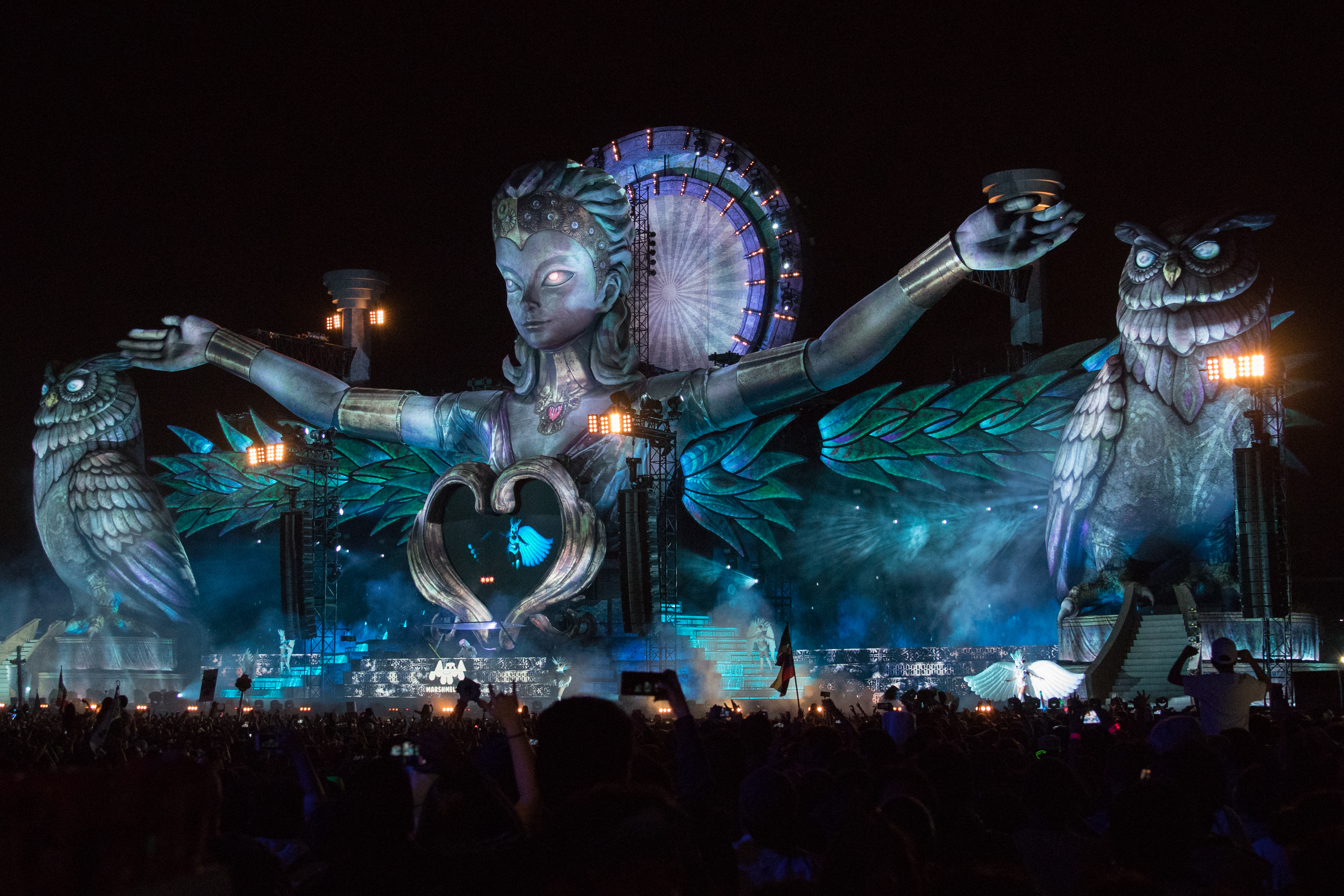
Marshmello playing the main stage of EDC Mexico City 2018

In 2018, EDC Orlando was held at Tinker Field from November 9–10. EDC Las Vegas was held at the Las Vegas Motor Speedway from May 18–20; the festival was moved from its traditional June scheduling so that it will be held in relatively cooler conditions. The festival also introduced on-site camping (including rentable campers and RV parking) and earlier opening times in order to reduce traffic congestion. An estimated 411,400 people attended the festival over the three days, which a record for the festival. EDC Mexico in Mexico City was planned for February 24–25 at Autodromo Hermanos Rodriguez. EDC Japan was held in Chiba, Japan May 12 & 13 at Zozo Marine Stadium and Makuhari Beach Park. Heavy Rains caused equipment issues. EDC China in Shanghai, April 29 & 30, debut at Shanghai International Music Park.

In 2019, EDC Las Vegas returned to the Las Vegas Motor Speedway for May 17–19 with a record of 465,000 people in attendance. On the second day, high winds forced stage closures. Due to wording of the message displayed on screens, and the played audio message instructing them to "take cover in your car", some attendees were led to believe that the entire festival was being shut down for the night and subsequently left the speedway. Upon learning at the exit that only certain areas were closed for safety precautions some people tried to re-enter the grounds but were not allowed back in due to the event's strict no-reentry policy. Las Vegas police announced 65 arrests during the festival, including 2 DUIs and 51 felony or gross misdemeanor arrests. EDC Mexico in Mexico City returned to Autodromo Hermanos Rodriguez for February 23–24, 2019. EDC Orlando is now held for 3 days, instead of the normal 2 days. It will remain at Tinker Field, outside of Camping World Stadium. EDC Japan was held in Chiba on May 11 & 12, 2019 at ZOZO Marine Stadium & Makuhari Beach Park. EDC Korea was held on 31 August & 1 September at Seoul Land, Gwacheon, South Korea.

=== 2020–present ===
In 2020, EDC Mexico in Mexico City was held at Autódromo Hermanos Rodríguez for February 28–March 2. It was announced that the 2020 festival would utilize more of the Las Vegas Motor Speedway grounds, with Rotella pointing out that the speedway had removed a large number of RV hookups that had made certain areas of the grounds unusable. The festival was originally scheduled to take place from May 15–17, but was postponed to October 2–4, and then ultimately cancelled, due to the COVID-19 pandemic.

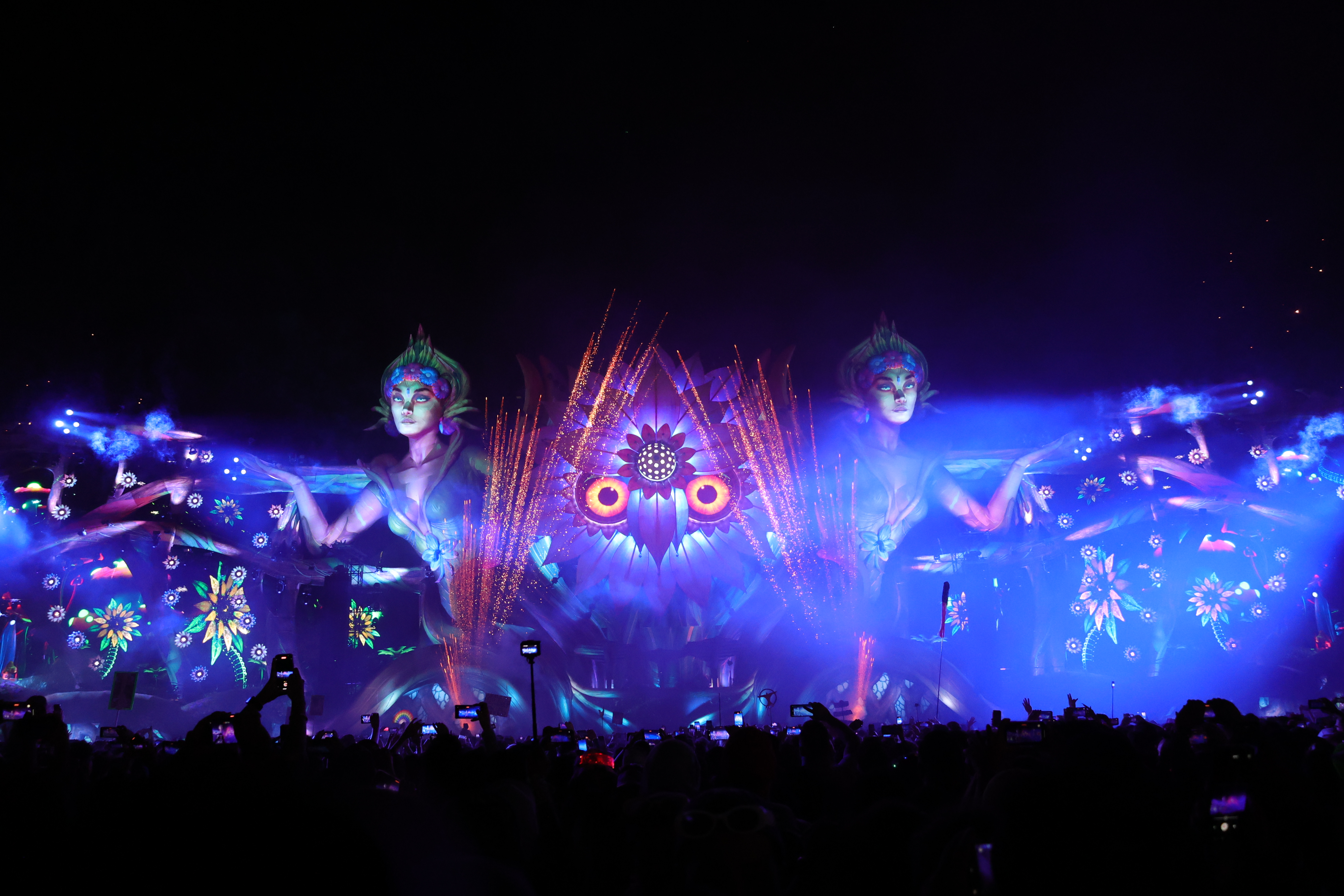
Kinetic Bloom Mainstage EDC Mexico, 2023

EDC Las Vegas returned in 2021, being postponed from May 21–23 to October 22–24 due to the lifting of COVID-19 restrictions in Nevada. The festival was observed as the "25th anniversary" of the festival, as well as the 10th anniversary of the festival's relocation from Los Angeles to Las Vegas. In 2022, EDC Mexico debuted a new house-oriented stage known as the Bionic Jungle, which made its EDC Las Vegas debut later that year. In January 2023, Insomniac announced a new spin-off event known as "EDSea", a festival cruise from Miami to the Bahamas on the Norwegian Joy.

EDC Thailand debuted in 2025 at the Boat Avenue Lakefront in Phuket from January 17–19 . During the festival, two foreign tourists died in suspected drug-related incidents, while three others were also arrested for use or possession of drugs.

Following the conclusion of EDC Las Vegas 2026—which was observed as EDC's 30th anniversary—Insomniac announced that EDC Las Vegas will expand to two weekends with identical lineups in 2027, being held from May 14–16 and 21–23. The two weekends—branded as "Dusk" and "Dawn" respectively—will have identical lineups; Rotella stated that the changes—and an associated reduction in capacity and ticket prices—would help to reduce congestion on the festival grounds and improve access to transport and accommodations. Outside of the festival, Insomniac will also hold curated side events across Las Vegas from May 13–24, promoted as the "Disk Till Dawn Experience".

== List of events ==
Year	Event	Dates	Venue	Attendance
1991	EDC		Chino, California	3,500
1992	EDC		El Mirage Lake, California	
1993	EDC			
1994	Not organised			
1995	EDC			
1996	Not organised			
1997	EDC	March 29	Shrine Auditorium and Expo Hall, Los Angeles, California	
1998	Not organised			
1999	EDC	June 26	Lake Dolores Waterpark, Newberry Springs, California	
2000	EDC	June 24	International Agri-Center, Tulare, California	24,000
2001	EDC	June 30	Hansen Dam, Lakeview, California	
2001	EDC Texas	May 5	Thunderhill Raceway, Austin, Texas	
2002	EDC	June 29	Queen Mary Events Park, Long Beach, California	
2002	EDC Texas	August 17	Travis County Expo Center, Austin, Texas	
2003	EDC	June 28	NOS Events Center, San Bernardino, California	
2004	EDC	June 26	NOS Events Center, San Bernardino, California	
2005	EDC	June 25	NOS Events Center, San Bernardino, California	
2006	EDC	June 24	NOS Events Center, San Bernardino, California	
2007	EDC Los Angeles	June 30	Los Angeles Memorial Coliseum, Los Angeles, California	
2008	EDC Colorado	June 14	Arapahoe County Fairgrounds, Aurora, Colorado	
2008	EDC Los Angeles	June 28	Los Angeles Memorial Coliseum, Los Angeles, California	154,000
2009	EDC Colorado	June 13	Arapahoe County Fairgrounds, Aurora, Colorado	
2009	EDC Los Angeles	June 26–27	Los Angeles Memorial Coliseum, Los Angeles, California	154,000
2009	EDC Puerto Rico	August 14	Arena Fairgrounds, San Juan, Puerto Rico	
2010	EDC Colorado	June 12	Arapahoe County Fairgrounds, Aurora, Colorado	
2010	EDC Dallas	June 19	Fair Park, Dallas, Texas	11,000
2010	EDC Los Angeles	June 26–27	Los Angeles Memorial Coliseum, Los Angeles, California	185,000
2010	EDC Puerto Rico	August 28	Estadio Sixto Escobar, San Juan, Puerto Rico	
2011	EDC Orlando	May 27-28	Tinker Field, Orlando, Florida	
2011	EDC Colorado	June 11	Arapahoe County Fairgrounds, Denver, Colorado	
2011	EDC Dallas	June 19	Fair Park, Dallas, Texas	
2011	EDC Las Vegas	June 24–26	Las Vegas Motor Speedway, North Las Vegas, Nevada	230,000
2011	EDC Puerto Rico	August 27	Estadio Sixto Escobar, San Juan, Puerto Rico	
2012	EDC New York	May 18–20	MetLife Stadium, East Rutherford, New Jersey	
2012	EDC Las Vegas	June 8–10	Las Vegas Motor Speedway, North Las Vegas, Nevada	320,000
2012	EDC Puerto Rico	September 15	Panamerican Pier Complex, Isla Verde, Puerto Rico	
2012	EDC Orlando	November 9–10	Tinker Field, Orlando, Florida	
2013	EDC New York	May 17–18	MetLife Stadium, East Rutherford, New Jersey	
2013	EDC Chicago	May 24–25	Chicagoland Speedway, Joliet, Illinois	
2013	EDC Las Vegas	June 21–23	Las Vegas Motor Speedway, North Las Vegas, Nevada	345,000
2013	EDC London	July 20	Queen Elizabeth Olympic Park, London, England	
2013	EDC Puerto Rico	September 13–14	Parque Luis Muñoz Marín, San Juan, Puerto Rico	
2013	EDC Orlando	November 8–9	Tinker Field, Orlando, Florida	
2014	EDC Mexico	March 15–16	Autódromo Hermanos Rodríguez, Mexico City	
2014	EDC New York	May 24–25	MetLife Stadium, East Rutherford, New Jersey	
2014	EDC Las Vegas	June 20–22	Las Vegas Motor Speedway, North Las Vegas, Nevada	400,000
2014	EDC UK	July 12–13	Milton Keynes Bowl, Milton Keynes, England	
2014	EDC Orlando	November 7–8	Tinker Field, Orlando, Florida	
2015	EDC Puerto Rico	February 21–22	Estadio Sixto Escobar, San Juan, Puerto Rico	
2015	EDC Mexico	February 28-March 1	Autódromo Hermanos Rodríguez, Mexico City	
2015	EDC New York	May 23–24	MetLife Stadium, East Rutherford, New Jersey	
2015	EDC Las Vegas	June 19–21	Las Vegas Motor Speedway, North Las Vegas, Nevada	405,000
2015	EDC UK	July 12–13	National Bowl, Milton Keynes, England	
2015	EDC Orlando	November 6–7	Tinker Field, Orlando, Florida	
2015	EDC Brasil	December 4–5	Autódromo José Carlos Pace, São Paulo, Brazil	
2016	EDC Mexico	February 27–28	Autódromo Hermanos Rodríguez, Mexico City	
2016	EDC New York	May 14–15	Citi Field, Queens, New York	
2016	EDC Las Vegas	June 17–19	Las Vegas Motor Speedway, North Las Vegas, Nevada	400,000
2016	EDC Orlando	November 4–5	Tinker Field, Orlando, Florida	
2016	EDC India	November 12–13	Buddh International Circuit, New Delhi, India	
2017	EDC Mexico	February 25–26	Autódromo Hermanos Rodríguez, Mexico City	
2017	EDC Japan	April 29-30	Zozo Marine Stadium, Chiba, Japan	
2017	EDC Las Vegas	June 16–18	Las Vegas Motor Speedway, North Las Vegas, Nevada	400,000
2017	EDC UK	Cancelled		
2017	EDC Orlando	November 10–11	Tinker Field, Orlando, Florida	
2018	EDC Mexico	February 24–25	Autódromo Hermanos Rodríguez, Mexico City	
2018	EDC China	April 29–30	Shanghai International Music Park, Shanghai, China	
2018	EDC Japan	May 12–13	Zozo Marine Stadium, Chiba, Japan	
2018	EDC Las Vegas	May 18–20	Las Vegas Motor Speedway, North Las Vegas, Nevada	411,400
2018	EDC Orlando	November 9–10	Tinker Field, Orlando, Florida	110,000
2018	EDC Guangdong	November 24–25	Chimelong International Ocean Tourist Resort, Zhuhai, Guangdong, China	
2019	EDC Mexico	February 23–24	Autódromo Hermanos Rodríguez, Mexico City	120,000
2019	EDC Japan	May 11–12	Zozo Marine Stadium, Chiba, Japan	
2019	EDC Las Vegas	May 17–19	Las Vegas Motor Speedway, North Las Vegas, Nevada	465,000
2019	EDC Korea	August 31-September 1	Seoul Land, Gwacheon, South Korea	
2019	EDC Orlando	November 8–10	Tinker Field, Orlando, Florida	225,000
2020	EDC Mexico	February 28–March 1	Autódromo Hermanos Rodríguez, Mexico City	
2020	EDC Las Vegas	Cancelled due to the COVID-19 pandemic		
2020	EDC Korea	Cancelled due to the COVID-19 pandemic		
2020	EDC Orlando	Cancelled due to the COVID-19 pandemic		
2021	EDC Mexico	September 3–5	Autódromo Hermanos Rodríguez, Mexico City	
2021	EDC Las Vegas	October 22–24	Las Vegas Motor Speedway, North Las Vegas, Nevada	500,000
2021	EDC Orlando	November 12–14	Tinker Field, Orlando, Florida	
2022	EDC Mexico	February 25–27	Autódromo Hermanos Rodríguez, Mexico City	
2022	EDC Las Vegas	May 20–22	Las Vegas Motor Speedway, North Las Vegas, Nevada	498,000
2022	EDC Portugal	June 17–19	Praia da Rocha, Portimão, Portugal	
2022	EDC Orlando	November 11–13	Tinker Field, Orlando, Florida	
2023	EDC Mexico	February 24–26	Autódromo Hermanos Rodríguez, Mexico City	
2023	EDC Las Vegas	May 19–21	Las Vegas Motor Speedway, North Las Vegas, Nevada	525,000
2023	EDC China	October 2–3	Yang Cheng Lake Resort, Suzhou, China	
2023	EDSea	November 4–8	Norwegian Joy	
2023	EDC Orlando	November 10–12	Tinker Field, Orlando, Florida	300,000
2024	EDC Mexico	February 23–25	Autódromo Hermanos Rodríguez, Mexico City	
2024	EDC Las Vegas	May 17–19	Las Vegas Motor Speedway, North Las Vegas, Nevada	525,000
2024	EDC China	Cancelled due to Typhoon Bebinca		
2024	EDSea	November 2–6	Norwegian Joy	Planned
2024	EDC Orlando	November 8–10	Tinker Field, Orlando, Florida	Planned
2025	EDC Thailand	January 17–19	Boat Avenue Lakefront, Phuket, Thailand	Planned
2025	EDC Mexico	February 21–23	Autódromo Hermanos Rodríguez, Mexico City	Planned
2025	EDC China	March 22–23	Yang Cheng Lake Resort, Suzhou, China	Planned
2025	EDC Korea	April 25–26	Inspire Arena, Incheon, South Korea	Planned
2025	EDC Las Vegas	May 16–18	Las Vegas Motor Speedway, North Las Vegas, Nevada	Planned
2025	EDSea	November 1–6	Norwegian Joy	Planned
2025	EDC Orlando	November 7–9	Tinker Field, Orlando, Florida	Planned
2026	EDC Thailand	January 16–18	Boat Avenue Lakefront, Phuket, Thailand	Planned
2026	EDC Mexico	February 20–22	Autódromo Hermanos Rodríguez, Mexico City	Planned
2026	EDC Las Vegas	May 15–17	Las Vegas Motor Speedway, North Las Vegas, Nevada	Planned
2026	EDC Korea	October 3–4	Inspire Arena, Incheon, South Korea	Planned
2026	EDC Colombia	October 10–11	Estadio Atanasio Girardot, Medellín, Colombia	Planned
2026	EDC Orlando	November 6–8	Tinker Field, Orlando, Florida	Planned
2026	EDC Thailand	December 18–20	Boat Avenue Lakefront, Phuket, Thailand	Planned
2027	EDSea	January 26–31	Norwegian Joy	Planned
2027	EDC Mexico	February 19–21	Autódromo Hermanos Rodríguez, Mexico City	Planned
2027	EDC Las Vegas	May 14–16	Las Vegas Motor Speedway, North Las Vegas, Nevada	
2027	EDC Las Vegas	May 21–23	Las Vegas Motor Speedway, North Las Vegas, Nevada	

== Charity ==
For every flagship festival held, Insomniac Care donates a percentage of ticket sales to national charities and community organizations. In the past, EDC Las Vegas has partnered with Surreal, a fundraising platform, to raise money from festival goers who enter in sweepstakes for helicopter rides and other activities with popular DJs. Since 2011, over two million dollars have been donated to groups. Some organizations are named below.

- Rock the Vote
- Families for Effective Autism Treatment
- Injured Police Officers Fund
- Boys and Girls Club of Southern Nevada
- Nevada Childhood Cancer Foundation
- The Las Vegas Academy for Arts

== Media ==
A documentary film, Under the Electric Sky, premiered at the 2014 Sundance Film Festival. The film chronicles the community and life of festival-goers during EDC Las Vegas 2013.

== Awards and nominations ==
=== International Dance Music Awards ===
==== 2010–2016 ====
Year	Category	Work	Result	Ref.
2010	Best Music Event	Electric Daisy Carnival – Los Angeles, California	Nominated	
2011	Best Music Event	Electric Daisy Carnival – Los Angeles, California	Nominated	
2012	Best Music Event	Electric Daisy Carnival – Las Vegas, Nevada	Nominated	
2013	Best Music Event	Electric Daisy Carnival – Las Vegas, Nevada	Nominated	
2014	Best Music Event	Electric Daisy Carnival – Las Vegas, Nevada	Nominated	
2015	Best Music Event	Electric Daisy Carnival – Las Vegas, Nevada	Nominated	
2016	Best Music Event	Electric Daisy Carnival – Las Vegas, Nevada	Nominated	

==== 2018–present ====
No award ceremony was held in 2017. In 2018 winners were chosen by the Winter Music Conference themselves. 2019 marks the first year of public voting since the Winter Music Conference's restructure.

Year	Category	Work	Result	Ref.
2019	Best Festival	Electric Daisy Carnival	Nominated	
2020	Best Festival	Electric Daisy Carnival	Nominated	

=== DJ Magazine ===
Year	Category	Work	Result	Ref.
2022	Top 100 Festivals	Electric Daisy Carnival	3rd	
2023	Top 100 Festivals	Electric Daisy Carnival	4th	
2024	Top 100 Festivals	Electric Daisy Carnival	2nd	

== See also ==
- List of electronic music festivals
