= Music of South Carolina =

South Carolina in United States

South Carolina is one of the Southern United States and has produced a number of renowned performers of jazz, rock, blues, R&B, country, bluegrass and other popular styles.

== Official music ==
South Carolina is noted for being the birthplace of beach music, an offshoot of early R&B and rock 'n' roll that featured a shuffling beat which spawned the dance called The Shag. This Myrtle Beach-area dance is the official State Dance, although South Carolina has also contributed to two other famous dances, the Charleston in the 1920s, and the Big Apple in the 1930s.

South Carolina also has three official state songs: "Carolina", composed in 1911 with words by Henry Timrod and music by Anne Custis Burgess, "South Carolina on My Mind", written in 1985 by Buzz Arledge and Hank Martin, and "Carolina When I Die," originally written in 2019 and updated in 2026 by Patrick Davis and performed with Darius Rucker and Edwin McCain. The State also has an "official music", Negro spirituals, sacred Christian songs originally developed in the 19th century.

== South Carolina musicians ==
Perhaps the best known rock band to hail from South Carolina is Columbia's Hootie & the Blowfish, but other groups such as Spartanburg's The Marshall Tucker Band, The Swinging Medallions, Maurice Williams and the Zodiacs, alternative metal band Crossfade from Columbia, Charleston's indie Band of Horses, Southern rock band Needtobreathe, Marcus King, and Blue Dogs also hail from the Palmetto State.

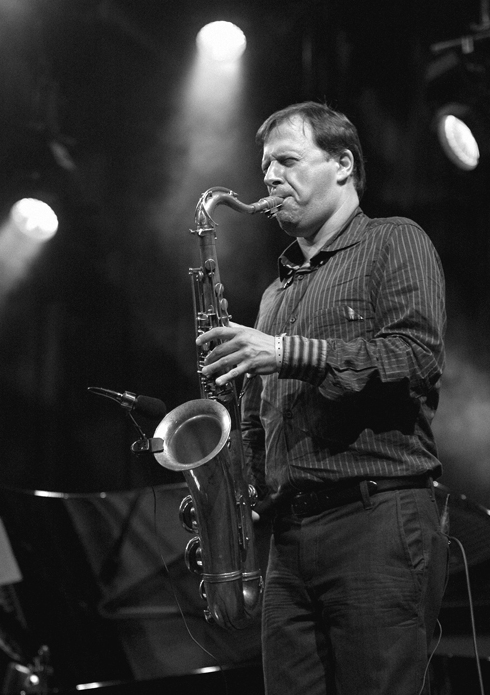
Chris Potter

Jazz saxophonist Chris Potter from Columbia has released 20 CDs as a leader and performed as a sideman on more than 150 other albums. He is the leader of the Chris Potter Underground and has regularly performed with many world-class jazz musicians including Dave Holland and Pat Metheny. In the December, 2014 issue of Down Beat magazine, which featured the results of the annual readers poll, Potter was named the number one tenor saxophonist in the world.

Other prominent musicians and singers born and/or raised in the state include soul/jazz musicians James Brown, Brook Benton, Maxine Brown, Dizzy Gillespie, Chubby Checker, Eartha Kitt, Peabo Bryson, Arthur "Guitar Boogie" Smith, Cat Anderson, Tom Delaney, Freddie Green, Drink Small, Johnny Helms, Terry Rosen, Jabbo Smith, Bill Benford, Tommy Benford, Nick Ashford, Darius Rucker; and rock/country musicians John Phillips, Josh Turner, Bill Anderson, Edwin McCain, Duncan Sheik, Rob Thomas, Marcus King, Walter Hyatt, David Ball, and Esquerita.

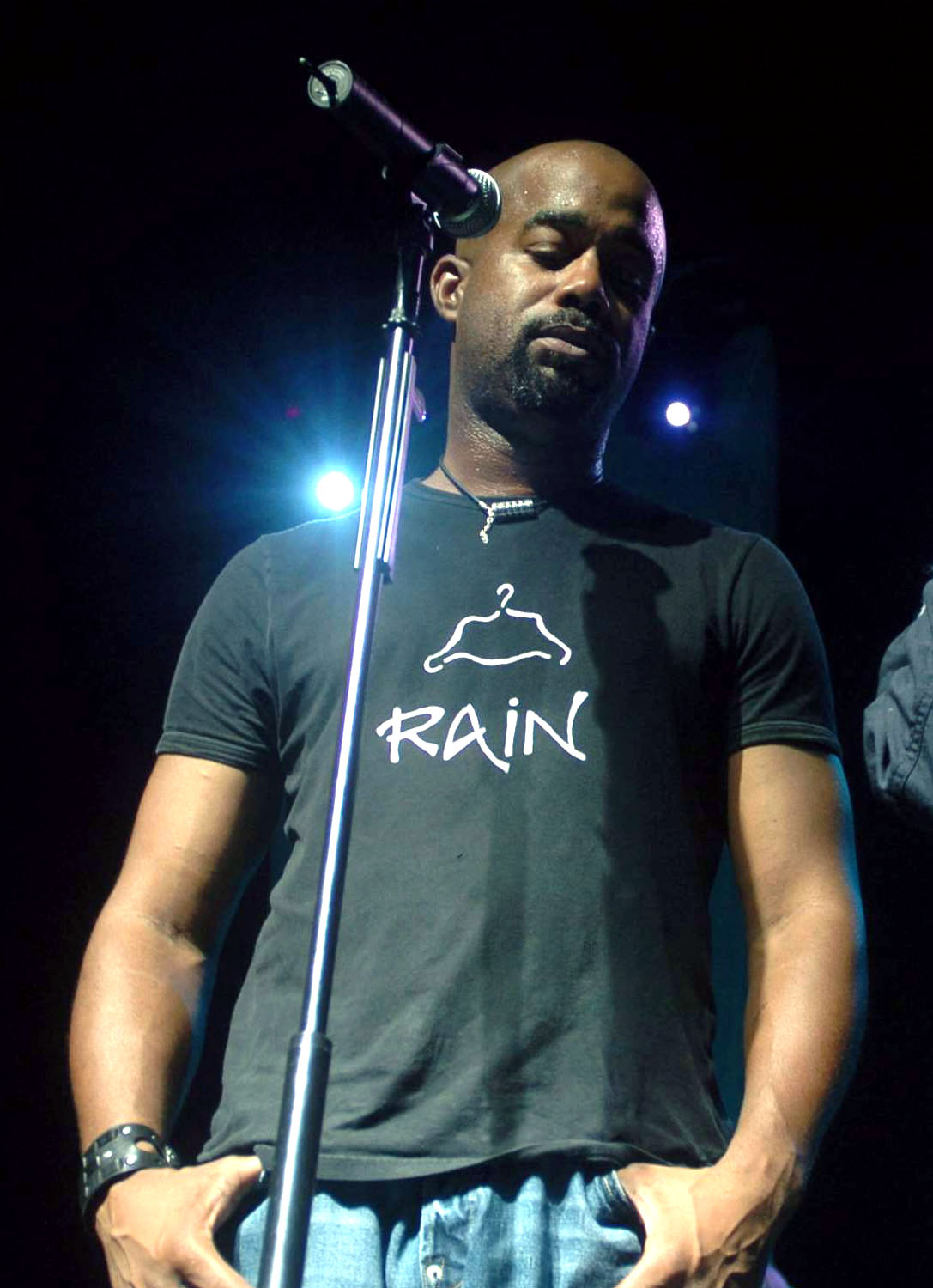
Darius Rucker

== Country/bluegrass ==
The state's bluegrass scene has produced important bands such as The Hired Hands featuring pioneering three-finger banjo player Dewitt "Snuffy" Jenkins and old time fiddler Homer "Pappy" Sherrill. Other notable groups are The Hinson Girls, featuring four sisters from Lancaster, and Palmetto Blue, featuring two South Carolina Folk Heritage Award Recipients: Chris Boutwell (2014) and Ashley Carder (2012), along with vocalist and bassist Shellie Davis, banjoist Steve Willis, flatpicking guitarist Edward Dalton, and South Carolina junior fiddle champion Ella Thomas. Bluesmen Pink Anderson (namesake for Pink Floyd; buried in Spartanburg) and Reverend Gary Davis were both from Laurens, S.C. Charleston's Roger Bellow, a South Carolina Folk Heritage Award Recipient and former host of the "Vintage Country" radio show on SCETV radio and WYLA-LP, leads the long-running country/swing band The Drifting Troubadours.

== Soul/R&B ==
The Beach music classic "Stay" by Lancaster's Maurice Williams and the Zodiacs was #1 on the Billboard Hot 100 in 1960. James Brown's (buried in Aiken County) soul and funk song "I Got You (I Feel Good)" was #3 on the Hot 100 in 1965, and #1 on the Rhythm and Blues Singles. Greenville's Peabo Bryson's R&B song "A Whole New World" from Aladdin was #1 on the Billboard Hot 100 in 1993.

== Rock/pop ==
Hootie & The Blowfish's roots rock song "Only Wanna Be With You", was number one on the Mainstream Top 40 chart in 1995. Hootie's debut album, Cracked Rear View, was the best-selling album of 1995, the seventh best-selling album of the 1990s, and is the 19th best-selling album in the United States. Their second album, Fairweather Johnson, went to number one on the Billboard 200 in 1996.

The Upstate band Needtobreathe had a number two album on the Billboard 200 with Hard Love in 2016. Indie folk singer Iron & Wine had a number two placing on the Billboard 200 with Kiss Each Other Clean in 2011. Country star Darius Rucker has had two number two albums on the Billboard 200: Charleston, SC 1966 in 2010 and True Believers in 2013, as well as nine number one songs on the Country Airplay chart from 2008 to 2020. Country singer Josh Turner from Florence County had a number two on the Billboard 200 with Your Man in 2006. Lee Brice from Sumter had two number five placings on the Billboard 200 with Hard 2 Love in 2012 and I Don't Dance in 2014. Toro y Moi, a popular electronic artist (who had a number one album on the Dance Chart with Anything in Return in 2013), and rapper Lil Ru are both from Columbia.

Urban centers in the state including Greenville, Columbia, Myrtle Beach, and Charleston continue to have thriving rock and hip hop scenes.

== Prominent venues ==
The region of Myrtle Beach has been home to the well-known Carolina Opry, a country music-based variety show, established in 1986 by singer, producer and entrepreneur, Calvin Gilmore, South Carolina's official country music ambassador, who continues to produce and perform in the show today. The Carolina Opry was the first live family entertainment venue on the Grand Strand and helped turn Myrtle Beach into one of the major centers for country music on the East Coast. Local venues include the Dolly Parton's Pirates Voyage, one of many attractions owned by Dolly Parton, the Alabama Theater, named for the band Alabama. Other artists tried their hand with their own theaters which did not last, such as Ronnie Milsap and the Gatlin Brothers. Myrtle Beach is also home to the South Carolina State Bluegrass Festival. The Carolina Country Music Fest has been held on the Myrtle Beach boardwalk since 2015.

Outside of Myrtle Beach, the town of West Columbia is notable as the home of Bill Wells of the Blue Ridge Mountain Grass; he is the owner of a local music shop, which hosts a weekly bluegrass show at the Pickin' Parlor.

Lesser known venues include the Radio Room in Greenville, Ground Zero in Spartanburg, the New Brookland Tavern in West Columbia and the House of Blues in North Myrtle Beach as well as the Pour House on James Island, and the Music Farm with locations in downtown Charleston and Columbia. The Five Points district in Columbia features a variety of bands each year at its St. Patrick's Day festival.

Charleston's WYLA FM (97.5 mHz) programs almost entirely local and in-state artists. The station broadcasts 24 hours per day from studios at the Charleston County Main Library, where they also host live performances.

== Lists of musicians and bands ==
Musicians

List
- Gus Aiken, jazz trumpeter
- Bill Anderson, country singer
- Cat Anderson, jazz trumpeter
- Pink Anderson, Piedmont blues singer
- Nick Ashford
- Brook Benton
- John Blackwell
- Lee Brice, country singer
- Ben Bridwell, singer
- Arthur Briggs, jazz trumpeter and bandleader
- James Brown
- Maxine Brown, soul singer
- Peabo Bryson
- Chazwick Bundick
- Chubby Checker
- Julian Dash, jazz tenor saxophonist
- Reverend Gary Davis, blues and gospel singer and guitarist
- Ray Davis
- Tom Delaney
- Ronnie Free, jazz drummer
- Dizzy Gillespie, jazz trumpeter
- Trevor Hall, reggae rock
- Jimmy Hamilton, jazz clarinetist and saxophonist
- Johnny Helms, jazz trumpeter
- Bertha Hill, blues singer
- Danielle Howle, singer and guitarist
- J. B. Hutto, blues singer and guitarist
- James Jamerson, bassist
- Buddy Johnson, jazz pianist and bandleader
- Ella Johnson, jazz singer
- Etta Jones, jazz singer
- Rufus "Speedy" Jones, jazz drummer
- Taft Jordan, jazz trumpeter
- Norman Keenan, jazz double bassist
- Eartha Kitt, jazz singer and actress
- Linda Martell
- Edwin McCain
- Josie Miles, blues singer
- James "Bubber" Miley, jazz trumpeter
- Pete Minger, bebop jazz trumpeter
- Alphonse Mouzon, jazz drummer
- Houston Person, jazz tenor saxophonist and bandleader
- John Phillips
- Bill Pinkney, singer
- Chris Potter, jazz saxophonist and composer
- Arthur Prysock, jazz singer
- Susan Reed, singer
- Terry Rosen, jazz guitarist
- Darius Rucker, singer
- Snookum Russell, pianist and bandleader
- Duncan Sheik, singer-songwriter
- Drink Small, blues guitarist and singer
- Cliff Smalls, pianist, trombonist and bandleader
- Chris Smith, composer
- Clara Smith, blues singer
- Cootie Stark, Piedmont bluesman
- Angie Stone, pop vocalist
- Baby Tate, Piedmont blues
- James "J.T." Taylor, singer
- Rob Thomas, singer-songwriter
- Lucky Thompson, jazz saxophonist
- Melanie Thornton, La Bouche singer
- Aaron Tippin, country singer
- Buck Trent, country singer and musician
- Josh Turner, country singer
- James Blood Ulmer, jazz guitarist
- Blind Willie Walker, Piedmont blues
- Baby Washington, soul singer
- Ron Westray, jazz trombonist
- Sandy Williams, jazz trombonist
- Josh White, Piedmont blues singer and guitarist
- Webster Young, jazz trumpeter

Bands

List
- Atlas Road Crew – Columbia
- Band of Horses – Charleston
- Carolina Liar – Moncks Corner
- Chasen – Greenville
- Cravin' Melon – Clemson
- Crossfade – Columbia
- Deepfield – Charleston
- Emery – Rock Hill
- The Explorers Club – Charleston
- Graves of Valor – Florence
- Guyana Punch Line – Columbia
- Hootie & the Blowfish – Columbia
- Hundredth – Myrtle Beach
- I Nine – Orangeburg
- Iron & Wine – Chapin
- Islander – Greenville
- Jump, Little Children – Charleston
- Madam Adam – Charleston
- The Movement (reggae band) – Columbia
- The Marshall Tucker Band – Spartanburg
- Maurice Williams and the Zodiacs – Lancaster
- needtobreathe – Seneca
- Nile – Greenville
- Sent By Ravens – Hartsville
- The Sequence – Columbia
- Sequoyah Prep School – Florence
- Shovels & Rope – Charleston
- Souls Harbor - Beaufort
- The Sparkletones – Spartanburg
- Stretch Arm Strong – Irmo
- Susto – Charleston
- The Swinging Medallions – Greenwood
- Through the Eyes of the Dead – Florence
- Uncle Walt's Band – Spartanburg
- The Working Title – Charleston
- Lighten Up Francis - Columbia

== See also ==
- Beach Music
- Piedmont blues
- Jenkins Orphanage, Charleston
- Appalachian music
- Indigenous music of North America#Eastern Woodlands
