= Lindsey Stirling: Live from London =

2015 video album by Lindsey Stirling

Video by Lindsey Stirling
- Released: August 7, 2015
- Recorded: November 6, 2014
- Venue: The Forum
- Genre: Dubstep; classical crossover; classical; electro house; trance; hip hop
- Length: 1:21:40
- Label: Lindseystomp (independent): Vertigo Records; Capitol Records; Universal Music (worldwide)
- Producer: SILAS; Marko G; Kill Paris; Scott Gold; Robert DeLong

Lindsey Stirling chronology
Shatter Me (2014)	Lindsey Stirling: Live from London (2015)	Brave Enough (2016)

Lindsey Stirling: Live from London is the first video album by American violinist Lindsey Stirling. It was released on Europe on August 8, 2015 as a DVD video release. The release features performances filmed during the European leg of Stirling's second concert tour, the Shatter Me Tour. The album reached the top ten position in German album charts, being her third consecutive album in doing so, peaking at number 8. It also reached the peak position at the German music DVD charts. A CD version was also released, with the same track listing.

== Track listing ==
1. "Beyond the Veil"
2. "Mirror Haus"
3. "Electric Daisy Violin"
4. "Night Vision"
5. "Heist"
6. "Swag"
7. "We Are Giants" (featuring Dia Frampton)
8. "Transcendence"
9. "All of Me"
10. "Take Flight"
11. "Moon Trance"
12. "Roundtable Rival"
13. "Master of Tides"
14. "Crystallize"
15. "Shatter Me" (featuring Lzzy Hale)
16. "Stars Align"

== Charts ==
=== Weekly charts ===
Chart (2015)	Peak position
German Albums Chart	8
German Music DVD Chart	1
