= Lindsey Stirling 2012–2013 Tour =

2012–13 concert tour by Lindsey Stirling

Lindsey Stirling Tour
- Tour by Lindsey Stirling
- Promotional poster for Lindsey Stirling's concert in London, 2013
- Associated album: Lindsey Stirling
- Start date: September 22, 2012
- End date: August 28, 2013
- No. of shows: 80 in North America; 37 in Europe; 7 in Asia; 4 in Australia; 128 in Total

Lindsey Stirling concert chronology
- Lindsey Stirling Tour (2012–2013); The Music Box Tour (2014–2015)

The Lindsey Stirling 2012/2013 Tour is the debut concert tour by violinist Lindsey Stirling in support of her first studio album Lindsey Stirling. The tour started in September 22, 2012, and ended on August 28, 2013. Stirling's first tour lasted almost a year with 128 dates around North America, Europe, Asia, and Australia. The Lindsey Stirling Tour began three days before the CD release of her first album, Lindsey Stirling. Her tour began with dates around the United States and Canada in 2012. At the beginning of 2013, Stirling continued her tour in Europe as a "test tour". Her official European leg kicked off in Russia on May 22, 2013. In August, she continued her tour adding dates around Asia and Australia.

== Setlist ==
The following set list is representative of the show on September 28, 2012. It is not representative of all concerts for the duration of the tour.

1. "Moon Trance"
2. "Spontaneous Me"
3. "Shadows"
4. "Electric Daisy Violin"
5. "Skyrim"
6. "River Flows in You"
7. "We Found Love"
8. "Lord of the Rings medley"
9. "Michael Jackson medley"
10. "Zi-Zi's Journey"
11. "Crystallize"
12. "Transcendence"

Encore

12. "Phantom of the Opera"

== Reception ==
The shows were a success in that 46 dates were sold out, and on Ticketmaster.com the audience gave a rating to the tour of 4.8 out of 5 stars. Reception was not uniformly positive, however. The Orange County Register lamented that her racial insensitivity ruined her performance in Anaheim. It specifically criticized Stirling's speech linking her cover of Rihanna's "We Found Love" with a corporate-sponsored international volunteering tour in Kenya, which perpetuated racist and colonialist attitudes toward its citizens. That review also criticized her misleading interpretation of Maya Angelou's poem "Caged Bird", which inspired Stirling's "Song of the Caged Bird", when she failed to mention the history of anti-Black racism in the U.S., a core part of the poem's meaning.

== Tour dates ==
Date	City	Country	Venue
North America
September 22, 2012	New Milford	United States	New Milford High School Theatre
September 23, 2012	Philadelphia	United States	World Cafe
September 25, 2012	Washington, D.C.	United States	The Hamilton
September 27, 2012	Boston	United States	Red Room at Café 939
September 28, 2012	New York City	United States	Webster Hall
September 29, 2012	Cortland	United States	SUNY Cortland
October 1, 2012	Toronto	Canada	The Mod Club
October 2, 2012	Pittsburgh	United States	The Club at Stage AE
October 4, 2012	Lansing	United States	The Loft
October 5, 2012	Columbus	United States	The Basement
October 6, 2012	Chicago	United States	Bottom Lounge
October 8, 2012	Columbia	United States	The Blue Note
October 10, 2012	Denver	United States	Bluebird Theater
October 11, 2012	Salt Lake City	United States	In the Venue
October 13, 2012	Tempe	United States	Marquee Theatre
October 27, 2012	New York City	United States	311 W 34th St
November 5, 2012	Santa Ana	United States	Constellation Room
November 6, 2012	Berkeley	United States	Pauley Ballroom
November 7, 2012	Santa Barbara	United States	Soho Restaurant & Music Club
November 8, 2012	San Diego	United States	The Irenic
November 12, 2012	West Hollywood	United States	Roxy Theatre
November 13, 2012	San Luis Obispo	United States	SLO Brewing Company
November 15, 2012	Portland	United States	The Hawthorne Theatre
November 16, 2012	Seattle	United States	Vera Project
November 17, 2012	Vancouver	Canada	The Rio Theatre
November 26, 2012	West Hollywood	United States	Roxy Theatre
December 31, 2012	Salt Lake City	United States	Infinity Event Center
Europe
January 14, 2013	Cologne	Germany	Luxor
January 15, 2013	Berlin	Germany	Lido
January 16, 2013	Tilburg	Netherlands	13
January 17, 2013	Groningen	Netherlands	Oosterpoort
January 18, 2013	Paris	France	La Maroquinerie
January 21, 2013	London	England	The Garage
January 22, 2013	Glasgow	Scotland	Oran Mor
January 24, 2013	Hamburg	Germany	Stage Club
January 25, 2013	Copenhagen	Denmark	DR Studie 2
January 26, 2013	Stockholm	Sweden	Göta Källare
January 28, 2013	Grünerløkka	Norway	Parkteateret
North America
February 5, 2013	Providence	United States	Lupo's
February 6, 2013	New Haven	United States	Toad's Place
February 7, 2013	Boston	United States	Royale
February 8, 2013	Montclair	United States	Wellmont Theatre
February 9, 2013	New York City	United States	Webster Hall
February 12, 2013	Philadelphia	United States	Trocadero Theatre
February 13, 2013	Washington, D.C.	United States	9:30 Club
February 15, 2013	Nashville	United States	Cannery Ballroom
February 16, 2013	Atlanta	United States	Masquerade
February 18, 2013	Gainesville	United States	High Dive
February 19, 2013	Tampa	United States	Ferguson Hall
February 20, 2013	Orlando	United States	Plaza Live Theatre
February 21, 2013	Fort Lauderdale	United States	Culture Room
February 25, 2013	Birmingham	United States	WorkPlay Theatre
February 26, 2013	New Orleans	United States	House of Blues
February 27, 2013	Houston	United States	House of Blues
February 28, 2013	Austin	United States	The Bellmont
March 1, 2013	Dallas	United States	House of Blues
March 4, 2013	Tulsa	United States	Cain's Ballroom
March 5, 2013	St. Louis	United States	The Paegeant
March 6, 2013	Madison	United States	Barrymore Theatre
March 7, 2013	Minneapolis	United States	First Avenue
March 9, 2013	Chicago	United States	The Vic
March 11, 2013	Milwaukee	United States	Turner Hall Ballroom
March 12, 2013	Indianapolis	United States	Old National Centre
March 13, 2013	Cincinnati	United States	20th Century Theatre
March 14, 2013	Pittsburgh	United States	Clue AE
March 15, 2013	Columbus	United States	Newport Music Hall
March 16, 2013	Detroit	United States	The Crofoot
March 18, 2013	Cleveland	United States	House of Blues
March 19, 2013	Buffalo	United States	Town Ballroom
March 20, 2013	Clifton Park	United States	Upstate Concert Hall
March 21, 2013	Burlington	United States	Higher Ground
March 22, 2013	Montreal	Canada	Coronoa
March 23, 2013	Toronto	Canada	Phoenix Concert Theatre
March 25, 2013	Lawrence	United States	Granada Theatre
March 26, 2013	Omaha	United States	Slowdown
March 27, 2013	Englewood	United States	Gothic Theatre
March 27, 2013	Denver	United States	The Gothic Theatre 3263 South Broadway
March 28, 2013	Denver	United States	Ogden Theatre
March 29, 2013	Salt Lake City	United States	In The Venue
April 1, 2013	San Diego	United States	House of Blues
April 2, 2013	Anaheim	United States	House of Blues
April 3, 2013	San Francisco	United States	The Warfield
April 4, 2013	Los Angeles	United States	Fonda Theatre
April 4, 2013	Los Angeles	United States	Fonda Theatre
April 5, 2013	Tempe	United States	Marquee Theatre
May 9, 2013	Montclair	United States	Wellmont Theatre
May 10, 2013	Richmond	United States	National Theater
May 10, 2013	Richmond	United States	708 E Broad St
May 11, 2013	Columbia	United States	Merriweather Post Pavilion
Europe
May 22, 2013	Moscow	Russia	Pipl Club
May 23, 2013	Yekaterinburg	Russia	Tele Club
May 24, 2013	Saint Petersburg	Russia	Kosmonavt Club
May 28, 2013	London	England	O2 Shepherds Bush Empire
May 29, 2013	Paris	France	L'Olympia
May 30, 2013	Brussels	Belgium	AB
May 31, 2013	Lille	France	Le Splendid
June 1, 2013	Strasbourg	France	Laiterie
June 3, 2013	Caluire-et-Cuire	France	Le Radiant Bellevue
June 4, 2013	Milan	Italy	Magazzini Generali
June 5, 2013	Munich	Germany	Kesselhaus
June 6, 2013	Vienna	Austria	Arena Wien
June 7, 2013	Zürich	Switzerland	X Tra
June 10, 2013	Stuttgart	Germany	LKA-Longhorn
June 12, 2013	Esch-sur-Alzette	Luxembourg	Rockhal
June 13, 2013	Cologne	Germany	E-Werk Köln
June 14, 2013	Neu Isenburg	Germany	Hugenottenhalle
June 18, 2013	Hamburg	Germany	Stadtpark
June 19, 2013	Berlin	Germany	Tempodrom
June 20, 2013	Odense	Denmark	Posten
June 21, 2013	Aarhus	Denmark	Musikhuset Aarhus
June 22, 2013	Copenhagen	Denmark	Koncerthuset, Studie 1
June 25, 2013	Bergen	Norway	USF Club
June 26, 2013	Stavanger	Norway	Hall Toll
June 27, 2013	Oslo	Norway	Rockefeller
June 29, 2013	Norrköping	Sweden	Bravalla Festival
North America
August 1, 2013	Anaheim	United States	Anaheim Convention Center
Asia
August 11, 2013	Tokyo	Japan	Summer Sonic Festival
August 12, 2013	Tokyo	Japan	Billboard Live
August 13, 2013	Osaka	Japan	Billboard Live
August 15, 2013	Seoul	South Korea	Supersonic Festival
August 17, 2013	Manila	Philippines	Greenbelt 3 Park
August 18, 2013	Manila	Philippines	Alabang Town Center Commerce Mall
August 21, 2013	Shanghai	China	The Mixing Room Theatre
Australia
August 24, 2013	Brisbane	Australia	Brisbane Power House
August 26, 2013	Melbourne	Australia	Corner Hotel
August 27, 2013	Melbourne	Australia	Corner Hotel
August 28, 2013	Sydney	Australia	The Metro Theatre

== Personnel ==
Band

- Lindsey Stirling – violin
- Jason Gaviati – keyboards, samples
- Drew Steen – drums, percussion
