= Lindsey Stirling 2014–2015 Tour =

2014–15 concert tour by Lindsey Stirling

Lindsey Stirling Tour
- Tour by Lindsey Stirling
- Promotional poster for Stirling's tour
- Associated album: Shatter Me
- Start date: May 13, 2014
- End date: September 5, 2015
- No. of shows: 93 in North America; 43 in Europe; 10 in South America; 8 in Asia; 6 in Oceania; 160 in total

Lindsey Stirling concert chronology
- Lindsey Stirling Tour (2012–2013); The Music Box Tour (2014–2015); Lindsey Stirling Summer Tour (2016)

The Shatter Me/Music Box 2014/2015 Tour is a worldwide concert tour by violinist Lindsey Stirling in support of her second studio album Shatter Me. The first tour dates were announced at the end of 2013 and the tour started on May 13 of the next year. The 2014 North and European American leg of Lindsey Stirling's tour consisted of her performing 77 shows over a five-month time span. For 2015, Stirling did 67 shows over five continents. Stirling toured around North America, Europe, Asia, Oceania, and South America, being her first time to present a show on this continent. In December 2014, it was confirmed that more than 200,000 people had attended Stirling's shows, more than half of those being in Europe.

== Background ==
On December 18, 2013, Stirling announced on her website that in the next year she would be touring around North America. That same day, the first concert dates were announced. On April 4, 2014 Stirling posted via Twitter that AJR would be supporting her tour from June 16 to 12 July. On April 11 Stirling announced that Anže Škrube would choreograph her tour. That same day were the auditions for the dancers. On May 9, it was announced that Stephen Jones and Peter Styles were the two dancers chosen to be part of the tour. The tour started on May 13, 2014 in San Diego, two weeks after the release of her album.

Striling performing in Buenos Aires, Argentina on April 17 as part of her Shatter Me World Tour

On November 13, two weeks after the European Leg of the tour ended, Lindsey revealed that 100,177 people had attended her 26 shows in the European continent. In that same month, on November 24, Stirling added 5 dates more in North America in California, extending also the tour to the year 2015. Stephen Jones and Peter Styles were not a part of this leg of the tour. On December 9, it was announced by the media that Lindsey would tour around Australia and New Zealand in February 2015. Two days later Stirling herself announced the new official dates. On December 22, the media revealed that Stirling would be performing on Singapore on March 3 of the next year at The MasterCard Theatres at Marina Bay Sands. In December OF 2014, Stirling confirmed that more than 200,000 people had attended her 77 shows since the tour started. In February 2015, Stirling added her first shows at South America, the only continent where she had never performed before. Shows in Argentina were so successful that an additional date was added on April 16.

The tour has received different names through the months, the most used are the 'Lindsey Stirling Tour', and internationally 'Shatter Me Tour'. Lately, in North America the tour has been promoted under the name of 'Lindsey Stirling: The Music Box Tour'.

After touring in South America, Stirling decided to make changes on her crew by adding four new female dancers: Malece Miller, Amy Yakima, Addie Byers, and Ashley Gonzales, and getting some female tour openers such as Melanie Martinez, Echosmith (Sydney Sierota), Lights, and Olivia Somerlyn. A video was published on her behind-the scenes channel on May 14 announcing the new dancers.

== Set list ==
The following set list is representative of the show in Boise, Idaho on May 26, 2015. It is not representative of all concerts for the duration of the tour.

1. "Ascendance"
2. "Electric Daisy Violin"
3. "Moon Trance"
4. "Master of Tides"
5. "Shadows"
6. "Elements"
7. "Video game medley (Assassin's Creed, Dragon Age, Halo, Zelda, Skyrim)"
8. "Song of the Caged Bird"
9. "Swag"
10. "Transcendance"
11. "Take Flight"
12. "Crystallize"
13. "Firefly"
14. "Roundtable Rival"
15. "Stars Align"
16. "Shatter Me"

Encore

17. "Beyond the Veil"

== Reception ==
The Orange County Register said of her sold out performance at the City National Grove of Anaheim "Not only did Stirling bow away with flawless precision, whether on a classical model or a modern electric version, she also moved like Jagger and sometimes joined two dancers in choreographed routines while fluidly continuing to play." while Niagara Frontier Publications commented "Dancing violinist Lindsey Stirling is to music what Steve Jobs was to computers." In the web page HrTicket.com acclaimed Stirling's performance writing on an article: " You've seen violinists. You've seen dancers. Perhaps you've seen stage shows with spectacular lighting effects and elaborate costume changes. But you've never seen what YouTube sensation Lindsey Stirling is going to be doing in her sold-out show at The Norva in Norfolk on Thursday night." The author also gave the concert a review of four over five stars.

== Tour dates ==
Date	City	Country	Venue
North America
May 13, 2014	San Diego	United States	Humphrey's Concerts by the Bay
May 14, 2014	Anaheim	United States	City National Grove of Anaheim
May 15, 2014	Los Angeles	United States	Club Nokia
May 16, 2014	San Francisco	United States	The Warfield
May 17, 2014	San Francisco	United States	The Warfield
May 19, 2014	Portland	United States	McMenamins Crystal Ballroom
May 21, 2014	Seattle	United States	Paramount Theatre
May 22, 2014	Boise	United States	Knitting Factory
May 24, 2014	Las Vegas	United States	House of Blues Las Vegas
May 26, 2014	Tucson	United States	Rialto Theatre
May 27, 2014	Tempe	United States	Marquee Theatre
May 29, 2014	Salt Lake City	United States	The Great Saltair
May 30, 2014	Broomfield	United States	1stBank Center
May 31, 2014	Papillion	United States	Sumtur Amphitheater
June 2, 2014	Madison	United States	Orpheum Theatre
June 3, 2014	St. Paul	United States	Myth Nightclub
June 5, 2014	Milwaukee	United States	Riverside Theater
June 6, 2014	Chicago	United States	Riviera Theatre
June 7, 2014	Detroit	United States	Detroit Masonic Temple
June 9, 2014	Indianapolis	United States	Egyptian Room at Old National Centre
June 10, 2014	Louisville	United States	Mercury Ballroom
June 11, 2014	Columbus	United States	Lifestyle Communities Pavilion
June 12, 2014	Lewiston	United States	Earl W. Brydges Artpark State Park
June 13, 2014	Pittsburgh	United States	Stage AE
June 14, 2014	Toronto	Canada	Kool Haus
June 16, 2014	Montreal	Canada	Métropolis
June 17, 2014	Boston	United States	House of Blues Boston
June 18, 2014	New York City	United States	Terminal 5
June 20, 2014	Sayreville	United States	Starland Ballroom
June 21, 2014	Westbury	United States	The Space at Westbury
June 23, 2014	Philadelphia	United States	Electric Factory
June 24, 2014	Washington, D.C.	United States	Echostage
June 26, 2014	Norfolk	United States	The NorVa
June 27, 2014	Charlotte	United States	The Fillmore Charlotte
June 28, 2014	Nashville	United States	Ryman Auditorium
June 30, 2014	Chattanooga	United States	Track 29
July 1, 2014	Atlanta	United States	Masquerade Music Park
July 2, 2014	St. Petersburg	United States	Jannus Live
July 3, 2014	Orlando	United States	Hard Rock Live
July 5, 2014	Boca Raton	United States	Sunset Cove Amphitheatre
July 7, 2014	Birmingham	United States	Iron City
July 8, 2014	New Orleans	United States	House of Blues New Orleans
July 10, 2014	Houston	United States	Bayou Music Center
July 11, 2014	Austin	United States	Stubb's BBQ
July 12, 2014	Dallas	United States	South Side Ballroom
July 20, 2014	Pemberton	Canada	Pemberton Music Festival
September 16, 2014	Puyallup	United States	Washington State Fair
September 26, 2014	Tempe	United States	Summer Ends Music Festival
Europe
September 30, 2014	Moscow	Russia	Crocus City Hall
October 2, 2014	Saint Petersburg	Russia	A2
October 4, 2014	Helsinki	Finland	Circus
October 6, 2014	Stockholm	Sweden	Fryshuset Klubben
October 8, 2014	Oslo	Norway	Sentrum Scene
October 9, 2014	Frederiksberg	Denmark	Falkonersalen
October 10, 2014	Hamburg	Germany	Alsterdorfer Sporthalle
October 11, 2014	Leipzig	Germany	Haus Auensee
October 13, 2014	Warsaw	Poland	Torwar Hall
October 15, 2014	Berlin	Germany	Columbiahalle
October 16, 2014	Frankfurt	Germany	Jahrhunderthalle
October 17, 2014	Cologne	Germany	Palladium Cologne
October 18, 2014	Esch-sur-Alzette	Luxembourg	Rockhal
October 20, 2014	Prague	Czech Republic	Incheba Arena
October 21, 2014	Vienna	Austria	Gasometer
October 23, 2014	Stuttgart	Germany	Porsche-Arena
October 24, 2014	Zurich	Switzerland	Hallenstadion
October 25, 2014	Strasbourg	France	Zénith de Strasbourg
October 27, 2014	Munich	Germany	Zenith Munich
October 28, 2014	Milan	Italy	Alcatraz
October 29, 2014	Lyon	France	Le Radiant
October 30, 2014	Brussels	Belgium	Ancienne Belgique
November 1, 2014	Paris	France	Zénith de Paris
November 3, 2014	Lille	France	Le Grand Sud
November 4, 2014	Tilburg	Netherlands	013
November 6, 2014	London	England	The Forum
November 7, 2014	Manchester	England	Academy 2
November 8, 2014	Dublin	Ireland	Vicar Street
November 10, 2014	Cenon	France	Le Rocher De Palmer
November 11, 2014	Toulouse	France	Le Bikini
November 12, 2014	Saint-Herblain	France	La Carriere
North America
January 29, 2015	Napa	United States	The Uptown Theatre
January 30, 2015	Sacramento	United States	Ace of Spades
January 31, 2015	Monterey	United States	The Golden State Theatre
February 2, 2015	Modesto	United States	Gallo Center for the Arts
February 3, 2015	San Luis Obispo	United States	Christopher Cohan Performing Arts Center
Oceania
February 14, 2015	Auckland	New Zealand	The Powerstation
February 16, 2015	Adelaide	Australia	Fowlers Live
February 17, 2015	Melbourne	Australia	Forum Theatre
February 20, 2015	Brisbane	Australia	The Tivoli
February 21, 2015	Sydney	Australia	Enmore Theatre
February 23, 2015	Perth	Australia	Astor Theatre
Asia
February 26, 2015	Dubai	United Arab Emirates	Dubai Jazz Festival
March 3, 2015	Singapore	Singapore	MasterCard® Theatres at Marina Bay Sands
March 4, 2015	Selangor	Malaysia	Bentley Music Auditorium
March 7, 2015	Tokyo	Japan	Blue Theater
March 9, 2015	Seoul	South Korea	Baekam Hall
March 10, 2015	Seoul	South Korea	Baekam Hall
March 12, 2015	Taipei	Taiwan	Legacy
March 13, 2015	Manila	Philippines	Mall of Asia Arena
South America
April 7, 2015	Bogotá	Colombia	Teatro Mayor Julio Mario Santo Domingo
April 9, 2015	Santiago	Chile	Teatro Cariola
April 11, 2015	Rio de Janeiro	Brazil	Citibank Hall
April 13, 2015	São Paulo	Brazil	Citibank Hall
April 14, 2015	Porto Alegre	Brazil	Teatro Do Sesi
April 16, 2015	Buenos Aires	Argentina	Teatro Opera Allianz
April 17, 2015	Buenos Aires	Argentina	Teatro Opera Allianz
April 18, 2015	Rosario	Argentina	Teatro Fundacion Astengo
April 20, 2015	Montevideo	Uruguay	LA Trastienda Club
April 21, 2015	Montevideo	Uruguay	LA Trastienda Club
North America
April 25, 2015	Guadalajara	Mexico	Estudio Cavaret
April 27, 2015	Mexico City	Mexico	Pepsi Center WTC
April 29, 2015	Monterrey	Mexico	Auditorio Banamex
May 21, 2015	Vancouver	Canada	Queen Elizabeth Theatre
May 22, 2015	Spokane	United States	INB Performing Arts Center
May 23, 2015	Missoula	United States	Wilma Theatre
May 26, 2015	Boise	United States	Idaho Botanical Garden
May 28, 2015	Morrison	United States	Red Rocks Amphitheatre
May 29, 2015	Salt Lake City	United States	Red Butte Garden Amphitheatre
June 1, 2015	Lincoln	United States	Pinewood Bowl Theater
June 2, 2015	Kansas City	United States	Uptown Theatre
June 4, 2015	Minneapolis	United States	Northrop Auditorium
June 5, 2015	Chicago	United States	Chicago Theatre
June 6, 2015	Cincinnati	United States	Bunbury Music Festival
June 8, 2015	Grand Rapids	United States	DeVos Performance Hall
June 9, 2015	Cleveland	United States	Jacobs Pavilion at Nautica
June 10, 2015	Lewiston	United States	Artpark
June 12, 2015	Syracuse	United States	Landmark Theatre
June 13, 2015	Boston	United States	Blue Hills Bank Pavilion
June 15, 2015	Red Bank	United States	Count Basie Theatre
June 17, 2015	New York City	United States	SummerStage
June 18, 2015	Vienna	United States	Wolf Trap Filene Center
June 20, 2015	Charlottesville	United States	nTelos Wireless Pavilion
June 22, 2015	Raleigh	United States	Red Hat Amphitheater
June 23, 2015	Whites Creek	United States	Carl Black Chevy Woods Amphitheater
June 24, 2015	St. Louis	United States	Fox Theatre
June 25, 2015	Milwaukee	United States	SummerFest
June 26, 2015	Rochester Hills	United States	Meadow Brook Music Festival
June 27, 2015	Rothbury	United States	Electric Forest Festival
Europe		United States	
July 1, 2015	Turin	Italy	PalaOlimpico
July 2, 2015	Rome	Italy	Cavea Auditorium
July 3, 2015	Arras	France	Main Square Festival
July 4, 2015	Budapest	Hungary	László Papp Budapest Sports Arena
July 7, 2015	Berlin	Germany	Berlin Open Air
July 8, 2015	Hanover	Germany	Hannover Open Air
July 9, 2015	Ulm	Germany	Sommerfestspiele
July 10, 2015	Munich	Germany	Tollwood Festival
July 11, 2015	Prague	Czech Republic	Žluté lázně
July 14, 2015	Istanbul	Turkey	Zorlu Center for the Performing Arts
July 16, 2015	Zurich	Switzerland	Live at Sunset
July 17, 2015	Freiburg im Breisgau	Germany	Zelt Musik Festival (ZMF)
July 18, 2015	Nice	France	Nice Music Live By Nice Jazz Festival
North America
August 6, 2015	Paso Robles	United States	Vina Robles Amphitheatre
August 7, 2015	San Francisco	United States	Outside Lands Music and Arts Festival
August 8, 2015	Berkeley	United States	Greek Theatre Berkeley
August 10, 2015	San Diego	United States	San Diego Civic Theatre
August 12, 2015	Tucson	United States	Tucson Music Hall
August 13, 2015	Phoenix	United States	Comerica Theatre
August 15, 2015	Santa Barbara	United States	Santa Barbara Bowl
August 17, 2015	Los Angeles	United States	Greek Theatre
September 4, 2015	Portland	United States	Keller Auditorium
September 5, 2015	Seattle	United States	Bumbershoot Festival

== Personnel ==
Band

- Lindsey Stirling – violin
- Jason "Gavi" Gaviati – keyboards, samples
- Drew Steen – drums, percussion
- Kit Nolan – keyboards, guitar, samples

Dancers

- Malece Miller
- Amy Yakima
- Addie Byers
- Ashley Gonzales
- Stephen "Stevo" Jones
- Peter Styles

Choreographer

- Kyle Hanagami
- Anže Škrube

Guest vocalists

- Dia Frampton (May 13 – June 10)
- Lzzy Hale (May 15)
