= Shatter Me (album) =

Studio album by Lindsey Stirling
- Released: April 29, 2014
- Recorded: September 2013–February 2014
- Length: 47:07
- Labels: Decca; Universal
- Producers: SILAS; Marko G; Kill Paris; Scott Gold; Robert DeLong; Lindsey Stirling (exec.); Rafii*; Reuben Keeney

Lindsey Stirling chronology
Lindsey Stirling (2012)	Shatter Me (2014)	Lindsey Stirling: Live from London (2015)

Singles from Shatter Me
- 1. "Beyond the Veil" Released: March 24, 2014; 2. "Shatter Me" Released: April 21, 2014; 3. "Master of Tides" Released: August 14, 2014; 4. "Roundtable Rival" Released: October 20, 2014; 5. "Take Flight" Released: March 23, 2015; 6. "We Are Giants" Released: September 9, 2015; 7. "Heist" Released: January 7, 2016

Shatter Me is the second studio album by American violinist and solo artist Lindsey Stirling. It is Stirling's first album to include collaborations with other vocalists, featuring Lzzy Hale and Dia Frampton, and Stirling has said its musical style is more progressive than her first album. The album was released on iTunes on April 25, 2014, in most of the world, on April 29, 2014, in the United States, and on May 2 in Germany. The first single, "Beyond the Veil", was released on March 24, peaking at number 22 on Billboard Dance and Electronic Digital Songs. The video was posted the following day. The second single, "Shatter Me", was released on April 23, accumulating 1.3 million views after one day on YouTube.

The album reached number two on the Billboard 200, making it Stirling's biggest week of her career in terms of sales, while peaking on three other Billboard charts. It has sold 337,000 copies in the United States as of August 2016. The album has been awarded a platinum certification in Germany in 2016 for selling over 200,000 copies. On October 21, Stirling's album was certified gold in Austria, being her second album in doing so. The album won the 2015 Billboard Music Awards for Top Dance/Electronic Album.

== Release and promotion ==
On September 29, 2013, Stirling posted on her official website that after her 2012–13 worldwide tour she had returned to the United States to make her new studio album and in December Stirling announced the upcoming 2014 tour where she "would play some new songs and will have a brand new show to share". Although the second studio album was announced in late 2013, it was not until March 2014 that Stirling started posting information on her new material. On March 12, Stirling posted a video on YouTube in which she appeared with friends and well-known YouTube stars such as Tyler Ward and Steve Kardynal. Stirling announced in the video the title of the album and that it would be released around May 2014. On the same day Stirling started an account on PledgeMusic, an online Direct-to-Fan music platform, allowing anyone to pre-order the album alongside other exclusive items, such as behind-the-scenes videos, photos and pictures. On March 23, Stirling announced that the album would be released on April 29. On the following day the album pre-sale started on the iTunes Store and the first single of the album, "Beyond the Veil", was released. The official video for the single was released a day later where it accumulated half a million views on YouTube on its first day.

Stirling appeared on March 26, 2014, at the Berlin Apple Store for a 30-minute interview and later performed "Crystallize" live. A day later, the pre-order of the album started on the German Amazon and iTunes stores. In April, iTunes released two free podcasts called Lindsey Stirling: Meet the Musician where Stirling talked about the creation of her newest album. On April 7, Stirling's first single video appeared on an mtvU votation to see, along with four other YouTube videos, which one would be aired. Stirling finished winning the votation. Three days later Stirling announced an event on April 29 to perform and sign Shatter Me CDs at Barnes & Noble, Los Angeles.

In April, Stirling was interviewed by Rock Era Magazine in order to promote her new album. On April 16, Stirling posted the behind-the-scenes video for the album's second single, "Shatter Me". Almost a week later, on April 22, Lindsey performed her single "Beyond the Veil" live at the Universal Studios Hollywood.

The second single, "Shatter Me", was released on iTunes on April 21, and two days later the official music video was released on YouTube, featuring the singer Lzzy Hale. On its first day on YouTube the video was viewed 1.3 million times. In April, Stirling was interviewed by Access Hollywood where she talked about fashion, her new album and fame. On April 23, Stirling organized an album release party for her fans.

Stirling performing in Buenos Aires, Argentina on April 17th as part of her Shatter Me World Tour

On May 13, Lindsey Stirling started the world Tour for promoting her album "Shatter Me". Dates had been announced since December 18 of 2013 and included forty-six dates in North America and twenty-seven in Europe. Lindsey revealed she would be accompanied by Jason Gaviati (Keyboards) and Drew Steen (percussion) who had been part of Stirling's first world Tour. Anže Škrube, Stirling's Dance Showdown partner, was chosen by her to choreograph her tour. Two new dancers were chosen to be part of her new world tour: Stephen Jones and Peter Styles.

On November 28, 2014, a special edition of the album was released by the name of Shatter Me: The Complete Experience, it included thirteen song, one of thema was an acoustic version of the title song, and a full-color 48-page magazine with exclusive interviews and photos, plus word magnets. After the release of the special edition album, Shatter Me returned to the Billboard 200 at number 175, with sales of 5,500 copies. In February 2015, Stirling visited Japan and on the same month the album was released on the country.

== Songs and artwork ==
"The whole theme of the overall album is about breaking free and learning, so it’s kind of my process that I went to rediscover who I was and be okay with that person and then love that person and share that person. It all started kind of with the theme of "shatter me"—I had to break free from the shell that I put over myself, and so that’s why it’s "Shatter Me"."

—Lindsey Stirling explaining the theme of "Shatter Me"

—

According to Allvoices, who took part in a call with Stirling, she said that Shatter Me is more progressive than her debut album. The cover of the album features Stirling as a ballerina inside the glass globe of a music box. The title track for the album is the story of the ballerina on the cover who longs for someone to shatter the glass and set her free, only to discover that she is the only one who can break the glass. Stirling said that the album follows a theme of breaking free and that it is based on her own experiences.

Stirling in the music video of the single "Shatter Me"

In an interview with Rock Era Magazine, Stirling stated that she was excited to release the music video for "Shatter Me" because "it epitomizes this concept and shows how difficult it is to break out of old habits and have the courage to step out of our comfort zones into the light".

On the behind-the-scenes video of "Beyond the Veil" Stirling says at the beginning that "Beyond the Veil" was the first song that she wrote for the album and so it is fitting that to her "Beyond the Veil" represents a kind of self-discovery.

According to an article on Blabbermouth.net the duet Lindsey Stirling and Lzzy Hale made for the title track of the second album was a complete change. Regarding how her collaboration with Lzzy came about, Lindsey said "this song is very, very—obviously—different for a Lindsey Stirling track, because I've never written lyrics before; I've never gotten to blatantly say what I feel."

In an interview on May 27, 2014, with azcentral, Stirling said "I have 100 percent creative control. If anyone ever tells me, "We don't like that song," it's kind of like, "Well, I like it. Too bad. I'm sorry." Album artwork? I get to make the decisions on everything." Regarding the goals of the album she said "I feel like I honestly wrote the album I wanted to write, which is really cool."

On an interview on September 30, 2014, Lindsey revealed on an interview why she didn't use such a harsh theme on her debut album: "I never wrote about it on my first album because it was too soon, and too close and I wasn’t ready to share it yet. I had just overcome an eating disorder and it was one of the hardest things I had ever done and one of the most soul-searching times. That’s kind of what the album is about, finding out who I was and getting through depression and the eating disorder."

== Critical reception ==
Professional ratings
Review scores
Source	Rating
Allmusic	3/5 stars

Allmusic gave Shatter Me three stars out of five where reviewer James Christopher Monger wrote that the album is "essentially a showcase for Stirling's instrumental prowess" and that Stirling "delivers the heat with all of the fire, fury, and mad, pixie-ish sweetness".

== Commercial performance ==
Upon its release in the United States, Shatter Me debuted at number two on the Billboard 200 with first-week sales of 56,000 copies, becoming the best sales week of Stirling's career. The album also peaked at number one on the Dance/Electronic Albums, Top Classical Albums, and Independent Albums charts. The album stayed at peak position on the Dance/Electronic Albums chart for nineteen non-consecutive weeks, a great improvement over Stirling's debut album that stayed only a week at the peak position. It joined ten other albums that have logged over fifteen weeks on top, tied at fifth place. The album has sold 337,000 copies in the United States as of August 2016.

The album also had a big impact on the Canadian charts, where it debuted at number five, selling 3,431 copies, an improvement on her first studio album which charted at number 146. Stirling's album also appeared for the first time of her career on the UK Albums Chart, charting at number ninety-five. Throughout the remaining European countries it reached the top fifteen. In Germany it reached number four—the same position as her previous album. In Switzerland Shatter Me reached number three, Stirling's highest position in the country. In Austria it also reached No. 3 and in Poland it reached No. 12, both of which are lower than the position of her debut album. Shatter Me entered in the Mexican Album Charts, being her first time for her album to appear in Mexico's charts.

== Track listing ==
All the tracks appear on iTunes in the US version. Stirling also sent an exclusive track titled "Yeah!" to those who pre-ordered Shatter Me via PledgeMusic.

No.	Title	Writer(s)	Producer(s)	Length
1.	"Beyond the Veil"	Lindsey Stirling; Mark Maxwell	Stirling; SILAS	4:14
2.	"Mirror Haus"	Stirling; Maxwell	Stirling; SILAS	3:55
3.	"V-Pop"	Stirling; Marko G	Stirling; Marko G	3:45
4.	"Shatter Me" (featuring Lzzy Hale)	Stirling; Maxwell; Dia Frampton	SILAS	4:40
5.	"Heist"	Stirling; Corey Baker	Kill Paris	3:26
6.	"Roundtable Rival"	Stirling; Sterling Fox; Scott Gold	Gold	3:23
7.	"Night Vision"	Stirling; Robert DeLong	DeLong	3:40
8.	"Take Flight"	Stirling; Maxwell	SILAS	4:24
9.	"Ascendance"	Stirling; Marko G	Marko G	4:26
10.	"We Are Giants" (featuring Dia Frampton)	Stirling; Maxwell; Frampton	SILAS	3:43
11.	"Swag"	Stirling; Maxwell	SILAS	3:10
12.	"Master of Tides"	Stirling; Maxwell	SILAS	4:21
Total length:				47:07

iTunes deluxe edition and Target edition bonus tracks
No.	Title	Writer(s)	Producer(s)	Length
13.	"Eclipse"	Stirling; Rafii; Reuben Keeney; Sam Hollander; Steve Shebby	Rafii; Keeney	3:15
14.	"Sun Skip"	Stirling; DeLong	DeLong	3:46
15.	"Take Flight" (orchestral version)	Stirling; Maxwell	Stephen J. Anderson	4:24
Total length:				58:32

Shatter Me: The Complete Experience Edition
No.	Title	Writer(s)	Length
13.	"Shatter Me" (acoustic version)	Stirling; Maxwell; Frampton	4:45
Total length:			51:52

Universal Music Japan deluxe edition
No.	Title	Writer(s)	Length
13.	"Senbonzakura"	Kurousa-P	3:16
Total length:			50:23

10 year anniversary deluxe edition
No.	Title	Writer(s)	Producer(s)	Length
13.	"Shatter Me (feat. Halestorm)"	Stirling; Maxwell; Dia Frampton		4:39
14.	"Take Flight" (orchestral version)	Stirling; Maxwell	Stephen J. Anderson	4:24
15.	"Waltz"	Stirling; Maxwell	SILAS	3:58
16.	"Forgotten Voyage"	Stirling; Nathaniel Motte	Motte	4:00
Total length:				64:08

== Personnel ==
Credits for Shatter Me adapted from liner notes.

- Lindsey Stirling – violin, vocals
- Andrew Maury – mixer (5, 6)
- Dia Frampton – vocals (10)
- Joe Lambert – mastering
- Josh Rossi – art direction, photography
- Justin Glasco – engineer (5)
- Kill Paris – producer (5)
- Liam Ward – packaging design
- Lzzy Hale – vocals (4)
- Marko G – producer, mixer, engineer, programming (3, 9)
- Robert DeLong – producer, mixer, engineer, programming (7)
- Scott Gold – producer, engineer (6)
- SILAS – producer, mixer, engineer, programming (1, 2, 4, 8, 10–12)
- Reuben Keeney – producer (13, iTunes/Target editions)
- Rafii – producer (13, iTunes/Target editions)

== Charts ==
=== Weekly charts ===
Chart (2014)	Peak position
Austrian Albums (Ö3 Austria)	3
Belgian Albums (Ultratop Flanders)	93
Belgian Albums (Ultratop Wallonia)	74
Canadian Albums (Billboard)	5
French Albums (SNEP)	35
German Albums (Offizielle Top 100)	4
Mexican Albums (AMPROFON)	22
Polish Albums (ZPAV)	12
Swiss Albums (Schweizer Hitparade)	3
UK Albums (OCC)	95
US Billboard 200	2
US Top Classical Albums (Billboard)	1
US Top Dance Albums (Billboard)	1
US Digital Albums (Billboard)	1
US Independent Albums (Billboard)	1
US Top Internet Albums (Billboard)	3

=== Year-end charts ===
Chart (2014)	Position
Austrian Albums (Ö3 Austria)	43
German Albums (Offizielle Top 100)	37
Swiss Albums (Schweizer Hitparade)	86
US Billboard 200	109
US Top Classical Albums (Billboard)	1
US Top Dance/Electronic Albums (Billboard)	4
US Independent Albums (Billboard)	10

Chart (2015)	Position
US Top Classical Albums (Billboard)	1
US Top Dance/Electronic Albums (Billboard)	2
US Independent Albums (Billboard)	17

Chart (2020)	Position
US Classical Albums (Billboard)	15

Chart (2021)	Position
US Classical Albums (Billboard)	25

Chart (2022)	Position
US Classical Albums (Billboard)	31

Chart (2023)	Position
US Classical Albums (Billboard)	39

=== Certifications ===
Region	Certification	Certified units/sales
Austria (IFPI Austria)	Gold	7,500^{*}
Germany (BVMI)	Platinum	200,000^{^}
United States (RIAA)	Gold	500,000^{^}
^{*} Sales figures based on certification alone.^{^} Shipments figures based on certification alone.

=== Singles ===
Year	Title	Peak chart positions			
Year	Title	US Dance/Electronic Digital	AUT	GER	US Class.
2014	"Beyond the Veil"	22	—	—	1
2014	"Shatter Me (ft. Lzzy Hale)"	10	—	59	1
2014	"Master of Tides"	—	—	—	—
2014	"Take Flight"	—	74	—	3
"—" denotes a recording that did not chart or was not released in that territory.

== Music videos ==
List of music videos, showing year released and director
Title	Year	Director(s)	Notes
"Beyond the Veil"	2014	Joe Sill	Featuring Hannah Stock; Concept by Joe Sill
"Shatter Me"	2014	Joe Sill	Featuring vocalist Lzzy Hale; Concept by Joe Sill & Lindsey Stirling
"Child of Light" (orchestral version of "Shatter Me")	2014	FifGen Films	Music produced by Stephen Anderson; Special effects by Warialasky; Sponsored by Ubisoft to promote their game Child of Light
"Master of Tides"	2014	UE BOOM	Filmed in front of a live candid audience at The Americana at Brand (Glendale, CA) on 18 July 2014 as part of Make Music Social
"Roundtable Rival"	2014	Everdream	Shot on location at White Horse Ranch in Landers, California. Concept by Lindsey Stirling.
"Senbonzakura"	2015	Tom Morris	Visual effects by Matt Duerr
"Take Flight"	2015	Joe Sill	Produced for the 2015 YouTube Music Awards. Stirling's first video not to feature a violin onscreen.
"We Are Giants"	2015	Brian Chojnowski and Grant Olin	Animation produced by MegaFive and Whitelist.tv; Executive Producer: Jerad Anderson; Production Head: Nick Erickson
"Heist"	2016	D Jay Brawner	Produced by Mike Longenbach and Anthem Films; Editor: Alex Jones; VFX: Tanner Merrill
"Night Vision"	2016	Unknown	Abridged version of song promoting Stirling's summer 2016 tour.

== See also ==
- List of Billboard number-one electronic albums of 2014
- List of Billboard number-one electronic albums of 2015
