= New Brookland Tavern =

Columbia Bar and Music Venue

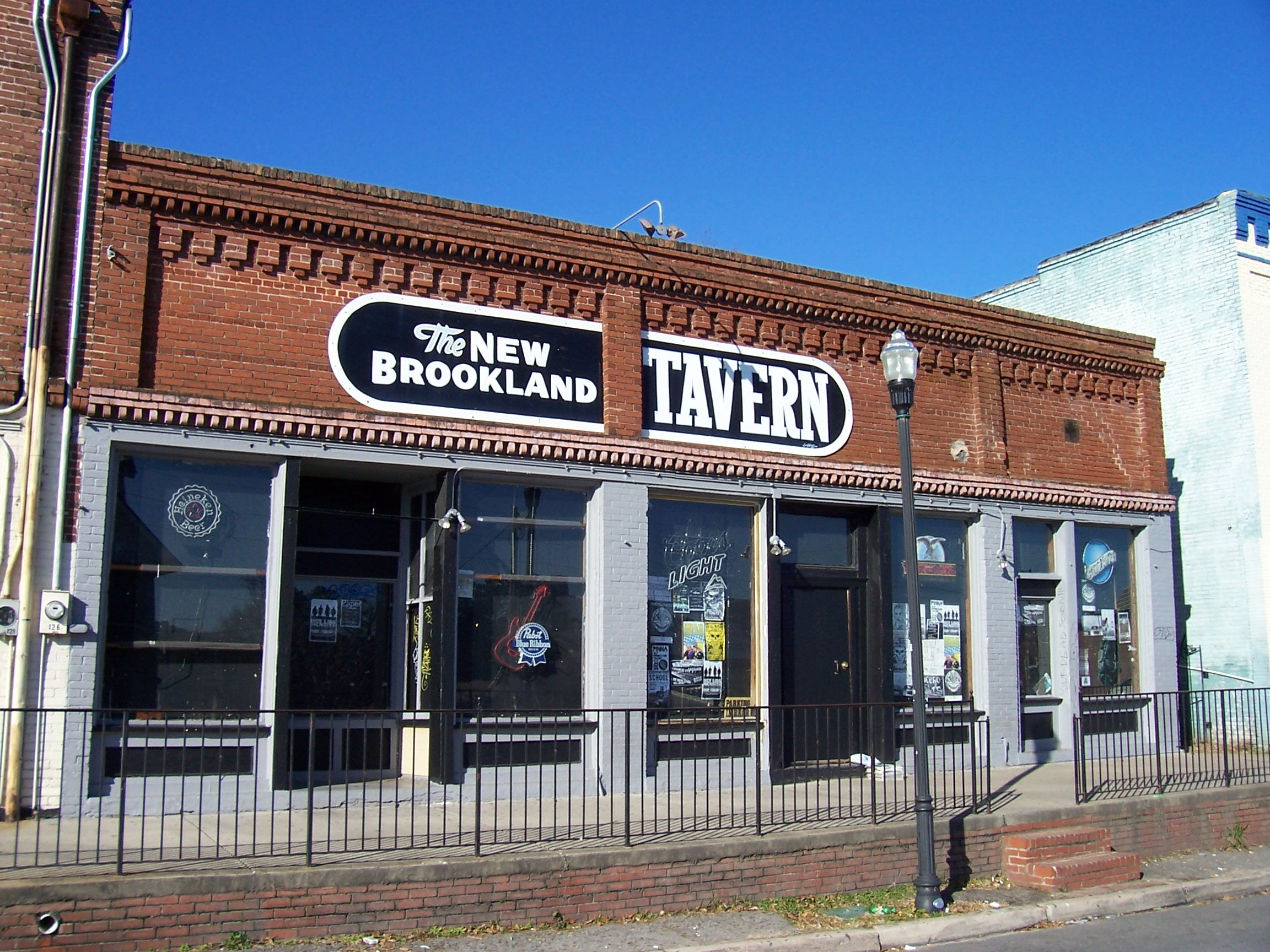
- The former front of the New Brookland Tavern
- Interactive map of New Brookland Tavern
- Location: Five Points (Columbia, South Carolina)
- Coordinates: 33°59′54″N 81°00′55″W

Website
- Official website

New Brookland Tavern is a bar and music venue located in the Five Points neighborhood of Columbia, South Carolina. New Brookland Tavern is one of, if not the oldest, continuous running music venues in the Columbia area. It is known for presenting live music 365 days a year. They have an annual New Year's Eve cover show and Emo Nights with 2000s music. It takes its name from the old name for West Columbia where it was previously located.

== Notable events ==
The bar was featured on the October 5, 1998, episode of WCW Monday Nitro when Mike Tenay was on the road with the members of the nWo Wolfpac (Kevin Nash, Lex Luger and Konnan), who were on a hunt for Scott Hall, an nWo Hollywood member.

In 1999, it hosted Collapsis, a late 90s band from the Chapel Hill scene, and Death Cab for Cutie. In 2000, it hosted then very popular Canadian band Our Lady Peace (who also played at Rock 93.5 Fallout at Finlay Park in '02). In '01, they had Bayside. In 2002, it had (separately) Taking Back Sunday (Adam Lazzara is from Charlotte), My Morning Jacket, Long Island's Brand New, Rilo Kiley with Jenny Lewis, and Hopesfall (from Charlotte) with ATL's Norma Jean. In 2003, it had Jacksonville's Yellowcard, then little known My Chemical Romance, and Iron & Wine from Columbia. In 2004 they had Florida's Underoath with nationally known hardcore punk Columbia band Stretch Arm Strong. In 2004, Jordan Miller of Columbia's The Movement (reggae band) rapped there, and it had Orlando's Trivium, Canada's Silverstein, and Rock Hill's Emery. In 2005, they had Panic! at the Disco with Augustana. In 2006 they had Atlanta's Manchester Orchestra and Nashville's Paramore (who had a #1 album on Billboard 200 in 2013 with Paramore (album). In '06 they also had O.A.R., Florida's Mayday Parade, and Charleston's Band of Horses. In '07, they had The Almost and A Day to Remember, both from Florida. In '07, they also had Portugal. the Man, and Between the Buried and Me a Raleigh metal band. In '08 it had Columbia's new wave Baumer (band), The Gaslight Anthem, and Memphis May Fire. In '09 it had Gainesville's Against Me!. In the late 00s, New Brookland had bands like Florence's Sequoyah Prep School (Justin Osborne of Susto's old band), Flyleaf, and The Wonder Years.

In 2010, Florida's Anberlin played there, Ohio's Hawthorne Heights, Ohio's Black Veil Brides, Charleston's hard rock Deepfield, Ice Nine Kills, and In This Moment (with a female lead singer). In 2011, they had Frank Turner and The Joy Formidable (both from the UK), MUTEMATH, mewithoutYou, and Columbia's chillwave musician Toro y Moi. In 2012, they had Hartsville's Sent by Ravens, Florida's New Found Glory, early 00s band Smile Empty Soul, and mid-90s band Sponge. From 2013 to 2016 they had bands like Emery with Jacksonville's The Red Jumpsuit Apparatus in '15, L.A.'s Capital Cities, Atlanta's Cartel, Chapel Hill's Southern Culture on the Skids, Jimmy Eat World's Jim Adkins, Sleeper Agent, Ohio's Foxy Shazam in '14, We Came as Romans in '14, I Am Dynamite, Family of the Year, Middle Class Rut in '13, Nico Vega, Crash Kings, Knuckle Puck in '14, and NC's Rainbow Kitten Surprise in '16. In 2017, it hosted Chicago 90s band Local H (who also played there in '04), Atlanta's '68 (band), and Ocala's Wage War. In 2019, it hosted 90s horror punk band The Independents from Florence, electronic rock band eleventyseven from Laurens, death metal band Through the Eyes of the Dead also from Florence, and Adelitas Way. In 2020, the White Reaper concert on St. Patrick's Day was cancelled due to COVID-19. New Brookland Tavern had no concerts from late March until September 23, 2020, due to COVID-19 (concert venues were closed in all of SC). They did have 2 online live stream concerts in April and June, and actor Drake Bell's concert became livestreamed to New Brookland.

On August 31, 2021, Hawthorne Heights returned to New Brookland with the female The Bombpops. In October they had the Hellzapoppin' circus tent side show. In December 2021, Charleston's Susto played there. In late February 2022, New Brookland had The Red Jumpsuit Apparatus again, and had Greenville's nu metal band Islander in March. 00s band Saliva played there in June. Aaron Gillespie and Spencer Chamberlain of Underoath played there for 2 different concerts, and country singer Tenille Townes performed in August. September 3, 2022, saw 90s NYC street punks The Casualties headlining with new lead singer David Tejas. H.R. of 80s hardcore punk legends Bad Brains performed there in 2022. Actor Corey Feldman performed music there in 2022. Cove Reber (formerly of Saosin) played there in '22 with his new band Dead American. Soulfly with Max Cavalera played there in early '23. Southern metal band Texas Hippie Coalition played there in July '23. Rap rock band (hed) p.e. played there in Aug. '23. The final show at the old New Brookland Tavern location was SC's Sequoyah Prep School (they had their first album in 2005) on December 29. On December 30, New Brookland Tavern moved to Five Points into the larger and historic Cotton Gin building. New Brookland Tavern had reggae rock band Ballyhoo! in March 2024. They had Wilmington, NC band He Is Legend in June 2024, female led Cults in October, Drug Church on Nov 6, Geoff Rickly of emo band Thursday, and Swedish black metal band Dark Funeral on November 12.
