= List of Billboard number-one electronic albums of 2012 =

These are the albums that reached number one on the Billboard Dance/Electronic Albums chart in 2012.

== Chart history ==
Key
†	Indicates best-performing album of 2012

Issue date	Album	Artist	Reference
January 7	Sorry for Party Rocking †	LMFAO	
January 14	Sorry for Party Rocking †	LMFAO	
January 21	Sorry for Party Rocking †	LMFAO	
January 28	Sorry for Party Rocking †	LMFAO	
February 4	Sorry for Party Rocking †	LMFAO	
February 11	Bangarang	Skrillex	
February 18	Sorry for Party Rocking †	LMFAO	
February 25	Sorry for Party Rocking †	LMFAO	
March 3	Sorry for Party Rocking †	LMFAO	
March 10	Sorry for Party Rocking †	LMFAO	
March 17	Sorry for Party Rocking †	LMFAO	
March 24	Sorry for Party Rocking †	LMFAO	
March 31	Sorry for Party Rocking †	LMFAO	
April 7	Sorry for Party Rocking †	LMFAO	
April 14	MDNA	Madonna	
April 21	MDNA	Madonna	
April 28	MDNA	Madonna	
May 5	MDNA	Madonna	
May 12	Club Life: Volume Two Miami	Tiësto	
May 19	Master of My Make-Believe	Santigold	
May 26	Master of My Make-Believe	Santigold	
June 2	Bangarang	Skrillex	
June 9	Bangarang	Skrillex	
June 16	Magic Hour	Scissor Sisters	
June 23	Bangarang	Skrillex	
June 30	In Our Heads	Hot Chip	
July 7	Evolution	Blood on the Dance Floor	
July 14	Bangarang	Skrillex	
July 21	Wild Ones	Flo Rida	
July 28	Wild Ones	Flo Rida	
August 4	Wild Ones	Flo Rida	
August 11	Bangarang	Skrillex	
August 18	Bangarang	Skrillex	
August 25	Now That's What I Call Party Anthems	Various artists	
September 1	Now That's What I Call Party Anthems	Various artists	
September 8	Bangarang	Skrillex	
September 15	Bangarang	Skrillex	
September 22	Bangarang	Skrillex	
September 29	Bright Black Heaven	Blaqk Audio	
October 6	Lindsey Stirling	Lindsey Stirling	
October 13	Album Title Goes Here	Deadmau5	
October 20	Album Title Goes Here	Deadmau5	
October 27	Album Title Goes Here	Deadmau5	
November 3	Album Title Goes Here	Deadmau5	
November 10	Until Now	Swedish House Mafia	
November 17	18 Months	Calvin Harris	
November 24	18 Months	Calvin Harris	
December 1	An omen	How to Destroy Angels	
December 8	Wild Ones	Flo Rida	
December 15	Dance (RED) Save Lives: Presented by Tiësto	Tiësto	
December 22	Dance (RED) Save Lives: Presented by Tiësto	Tiësto	
December 29	Wild Ones	Flo Rida	
