= Mark Maxwell =

- Genres: EDM; Pop; Hip Hop
- Occupations: Songwriter; Record Producer; Film Composer
- Instruments: Vocals; piano; synthesizers; programming; guitar; bass; drums

Mark Maxwell, aka SILAS, is an American songwriter, record producer, and film composer based in Los Angeles. He is best known for his work with Afrojack, Lindsey Stirling, 3OH!3, the Millionaires (band), and Itch.

Maxwell co-wrote and produced seven songs for Lindsey Stirling's sophomore album Shatter Me, which won the 2015 Billboard Music Award for Top Dance/Electronic Album.

Maxwell also composed the original score for the 2016 comedy film Brother Nature. Scoring credits also include the theme music for MTV's Real World: Ex-Plosion.

== Discography ==
Year	Album	Artist	Details
2008	Ghost Town	Watchout! Theres Ghosts	Co-writer, producer, mixer "I'll Take Famous Murders for 500," “Never You," “The Shake Up," “I Ruin Dreams, Not Nightmares," “Makin' Moves," “A Beautiful Goodbye," “Don't Shoot Me Annie Oakley," “Ghost Town," “Sleeping at the Movies," “Remember Me, Oh God, For Good”
2009	Just Got Paid, Let's Get Laid	Millionaires	Co-writer, producer, mixer "Just Got Paid, Let's Get Laid" “Alcohol" “I Like Money" “Talk Shit" “I Move It"
2009	Heartbreak on Vinyl	Blake Lewis	Producer, mixer "Rhythm of My Heart", Additional production, mixer "Heartbreak on Vinyl," Additional production "Sad Song"
2009	Love Drunk	Boys Like Girls	Additional production, "Heart Heart Heartbreak," "She's Got A Boyfriend Now," "Real Thing," "The Shot Heard 'Round the World," "Chemicals Collide"
2009	Jennifer's Body Soundtrack	Cobra Starship	Additional production "Chew Me Up & Spit Me Out"
2010	Call The Cops	Call The Cops	Co-writer, additional production "Get Up Or Get Down" Co-writer "The Crash”
2010	My Uke Has a Crush on You	Stephen Jerzak	Co-writer, producer "Luv Me 2" "Everyday's a Holiday"
2011	Miles and Miles	Stephen Jerzak	Co-writer "Hot Over Summer" "Peace Out", Producer "Love Is Strong"
2011	Masters of the Universe	Let's Get It	Co-writer, additional production "Night of the Living Shred"
2012	What Are You So Scared Of?	Tonight Alive	Co-writer "Starlight" "Let It Land"
2012	Young London	Young London	Co-writer, producer, mixer "New Reputation" "Let Me Go" "Celebrity" "Be My Radio" "Dangerous" "Whipped" "The Good Stuff" "Trippin' Up" "Summer Valentine" "U Got Me"
2012	Remembering You	Poema	Co-writer "Wonder" "Fallin"
2012	Dancing to the Same Song	Elen Levon	Co-writer, co-producer, mixer "Dancing to the Same Song"
2013	OMENS	3OH!3	Co-writer, co-producer, mixer "Hungover" (credited as SILAS)
2013	The Manifesto EPs	Itch	Co-writer, producer, mixer "Spooky Kids" (credited as SILAS)
2014	The Deep End	Itch	Co-writer, producer, mixer "Ricochet" (credited as SILAS)
2014	Shatter Me	Lindsey Stirling	Co-writer, producer, mixer "Shatter Me" "We Are Giants" "Beyond the Veil" "Master of Tides" "Take Flight" "Mirror Haus" "Swag" (credited as SILAS)
2014	Forget the World	Afrojack	Co-writer, co-producer "The Spark"
2014	Redefined	tyDi	Co-writer, co-producer, mixer "Die Without You" (credited as SILAS)
2014	Dark Days	Spree Wilson	Co-writer, co-producer "Dark Days"
2015	Savages	Five Knives	Co-writer, additional production "Savages"
2015	Ghostchild	Firebeatz & Apster	Co-writer, vocal producer "Ghostchild"
2016	The Love That Remains	Savoir Adore	Co-writer, co-producer "Paradise Gold"
2016	Brave Enough	Lindsey Stirling	Co-writer, producer, mixer "Waltz (deluxe edition)" (credited as SILAS)
2018	Warmer In The Winter	Lindsey Stirling	Producer, mixer "I Wonder As I Wander (deluxe edition)" "Santa Baby (deluxe edition)"
2019	Happysad	Meg & Dia	Co-writer "Better At Being Young"
2019	Artemis	Lindsey Stirling	Co-writer, producer, mixer "Artemis" "Between Twilight" "Foreverglow" "Embers (deluxe edition)" "Torch Bringer (deluxe edition)"
2020	1000 Faces	Jason Ross	Co-writer, vocal producer "1000 Faces"

== Remixes ==
Year	Album	Artist	Details
2013	GMYH v2	The Ready Set	Remixer "Give Me Your Hand (Best Song Ever) (SILAS Remix)"
2013	F*** U Over	The Summer Set	Remixer "F*** U Over (SILAS Remix)"
2013	London Is Burning	Itch	Remixer "London Is Burning (SILAS Remix)"
2013	Homeless Romantic	Itch	Remixer "Homeless Romantic (SILAS Remix)"
2013	Live This Lie	tyDi	Remixer "Live This Lie (SILAS Remix)"
2014	Over It	The Crystal Method	Remixer "Over It (SILAS Remix)"
2020	Happysad Remixes	Meg & Dia	Remixer "Better At Being Young (Mark Maxwell Remix)"
