= Ultraviolet (EP) =

EP by Owl City
- Released: June 27, 2014
- Studios: Sky Harbor Studios, Owatonna, Minnesota
- Genres: Electropop, EDM
- Length: 14:30
- Label: Republic
- Producer: Adam Young

Owl City chronology
The Midsummer Station - Acoustic EP (2013)	Ultraviolet (2014)	The Best of Owl City (2014)

Singles from Ultraviolet
- 1. "Beautiful Times" Released: April 8, 2014; 2. "Wolf Bite" Released: June 18, 2014

Ultraviolet is the fourth extended play by American electronica project Owl City, released digitally on June 27, 2014, through Republic Records. The EP's lead single, "Beautiful Times", which features violinist Lindsey Stirling, was released on April 8, 2014.

== Background and release ==
In early 2014, Young revealed the album artwork for his single, "Beautiful Times", through his Instagram account. The song, which was released on April 8, would act as the lead single for Ultraviolet and features music by violinist Lindsey Stirling. Following the release of "Beautiful Times", Young stated his intent to release a steady "series of EPs" in 2014 rather than one larger recording. On June 5, it was announced that the EP would be released on June 27. The album art and track listing, as well as a clip of one of the songs, were released on June 10 as part of a social media marketing campaign to promote the release of the EP.

On June 17, the EP was released for pre-order on iTunes. On June 18, Owl City premiered a new track, "Wolf Bite" days before the release of the EP. On June 25, a preview for the "Beautiful Times" music video was released. The music video premiered the following day via Rolling Stone.

On July 17, Owl City released a visualizer video for the song "Wolf Bite" premiering on MetroLyrics.com through Vevo. On August 1, a visualizer video for "Up All Night" was released. Adam Young has expressed his interest to create respective visualizers for each song in this EP. On August 29, the video for "This Isn't the End" was released and serves as the last visualizer for the EP. The song was also included on the subsequent studio album, Mobile Orchestra.

== Composition ==
Adam Young wrote and produced the EP entirely by himself. According to Young, the EP is a "deeper venture into EDM" and has a more "edgier sound to Owl City than experienced before."

== Critical reception ==
Professional ratings
Review scores
Source	Rating
Jesus Freak Hideout	4/5 stars

Ultraviolet was generally met with positive reviews. Fred Thomas of AllMusic stated, "Ultraviolet's high point was first song and subsequent single 'Beautiful Times', a bounding pop track marked by soaring string arrangements from guest violinist Lindsey Stirling." Marcus Floyd of Renowned for Sound remarked, "There are definitely some different sounds being experimented here with Ultraviolet, standing out from the light hearted pop previously tapped into by Owl City." Scott Fryberger of Jesus Freak Hideout called the EP "a breath of fresh air" and compared the record to Owl City's third studio album, All Things Bright and Beautiful.

== Commercial performance ==
Ultraviolet peaked at No. 30 on the Billboard 200 chart. The EP sold 9,000 copies in its first week in the United States. The lead single "Beautiful Times" peaked at number 91 on the Japan Hot 100 chart. "Wolf Bite" reached the US Christian Rock Songs chart and the US Dance/Electronic Digital Song Sales at number 22 and number 48 respectively. "This Isn't the End" peaked at number six on the UK Cross Rhythms Weekly Chart. "Up All Night" entered the South Korean GAON International chart at number 91.

== Track listing ==
All tracks are written by Adam Young.

Ultraviolet track listing
No.	Title	Length
1.	"Beautiful Times" (featuring Lindsey Stirling)	3:25
2.	"Up All Night"	3:51
3.	"This Isn't the End"	3:24
4.	"Wolf Bite"	3:50
Total length:		14:30

Notes

- After deciding to include "This Isn't the End" as the closer on his fifth studio album Mobile Orchestra, the EP was reissued without the song on May 14, 2015.

== Charts ==
Chart performance for Ultraviolet
Chart (2014)	Peak position
US Billboard 200	30
