= Our Graceful Words =

Studio album by Sent by Ravens
- Released: April 20, 2010
- Genre: Christian metal, post-hardcore, hard rock
- Length: 38:27
- Label: Tooth & Nail
- Producer: Aaron Sprinkle

Sent by Ravens chronology
The Effects of Fashion and Prayer (EP) (2008)	Our Graceful Words (2010)	Mean What You Say (LP) (2012)

Singles from Our Graceful Words
- 1. "Trailers vs. Tornados" Released: August 19, 2009; 2. "New Fire" Released: June 1, 2010; 3. "Beautiful List" Released: 2010; 4. "Salt and the Light" Released: 2011

Our Graceful Words is the first full-length studio album by Christian rock band Sent by Ravens. It is the follow-up to their 2008 EP, The Effects of Fashion and Prayer. The album was released on April 20, 2010 and reached No. 35 on the Billboard Top Heatseekers chart.

== Track listing ==
All tracks are written by Sent By Ravens

No.	Title	Length
1.	"New Fire"	3:38
2.	"An Honest Heart"	3:11
3.	"I Hear Her Breathe"	3:21
4.	"Beautiful List"	3:15
5.	"Trailers vs. Tornadoes"	3:18
6.	"Jill Plays Tricks, Jack Plays God"	3:42
7.	"Philadelphia"	3:20
8.	"Salt and the Light"	3:45
9.	"This Awakening"	3:26
10.	"Stone Soup"	2:58
11.	"True Bride"	3:27

== Charts ==
Year	Chart	Peak position
2010	U.S. Billboard Top Heatseekers	35
