= List of Billboard number-one electronic albums of 2015 =

These are the albums that reached number one on the Billboard Dance/Electronic Albums chart in 2015.

== Chart history ==
Key
| † | Indicates best-performing album of 2015 |

| Issue date | Album | Artist | Reference |
|---|---|---|---|
| January 3 | Shatter Me | Lindsey Stirling | |
| January 10 | Shatter Me | Lindsey Stirling | |
| January 17 | Motion | Calvin Harris | |
| January 24 | Shatter Me | Lindsey Stirling | |
| January 31 | Shatter Me | Lindsey Stirling | |
| February 7 | We Are All We Need | Above & Beyond | |
| February 14 | Computer Controlled Acoustic Instruments pt2 | Aphex Twin | |
| February 21 | Lost Themes | John Carpenter | |
| February 28 | Shatter Me | Lindsey Stirling | |
| March 7 | Shatter Me | Lindsey Stirling | |
| March 14 | Skrillex and Diplo Present Jack Ü | Jack Ü | |
| March 21 | Another Eternity | Purity Ring | |
| March 28 | Another Eternity | Purity Ring | |
| April 4 | Another Eternity | Purity Ring | |
| April 11 | Shatter Me | Lindsey Stirling | |
| April 18 | Adventure | Madeon | |
| April 25 | Run | Alison Wonderland | |
| May 2 | Skrillex and Diplo Present Jack Ü | Jack Ü | |
| May 9 | Soundclash EP | Flosstradamus | |
| May 16 | MG | MG | |
| May 23 | Shatter Me | Lindsey Stirling | |
| May 30 | Listen † | David Guetta | |
| June 6 | True Colors | Zedd | |
| June 13 | Forever | Alesso | |
| June 20 | In Colour | Jamie xx | |
| June 27 | Pharmacy | Galantis | |
| July 4 | Déjà Vu | Giorgio Moroder | |
| July 11 | Peace Is the Mission | Major Lazer | |
| July 18 | Into the Sun | Bassnectar | |
| July 25 | Into the Sun | Bassnectar | |
| August 1 | Communion | Years & Years | |
| August 8 | Magnifique | Ratatat | |
| August 15 | In Return | Odesza | |
| August 22 | Peace Is the Mission | Major Lazer | |
| August 29 | Love Is Free | Robyn & La Bagatelle Magique | |
| September 5 | This Mixtape Is Fire | Dillon Francis | |
| September 12 | Orphaned Deejay Selek 2006–2008 | AFX | |
| September 19 | We Are Your Friends: Music from the Original Motion Picture | Soundtrack | |
| September 26 | Shatter Me | Lindsey Stirling | |
| October 3 | Between II Worlds | Nero | |
| October 10 | True Colors | Zedd | |
| October 17 | Caracal | Disclosure | |
| October 24 | Stories | Avicii | |
| October 31 | Caracal | Disclosure | |
| November 7 | Caracal | Disclosure | |
| November 14 | Peace Is the Mission | Major Lazer | |
| November 21 | Papi Gordo | Carnage | |
| November 28 | In Return | Odesza | |
| December 5 | Caracal | Disclosure | |
| December 12 | Blood for Mercy | Yellow Claw | |
| December 19 | Listen † | David Guetta | |
| December 26 | Neptones: A Compilation by JC Caylen | Various artists | |
