= You're Gonna Love This =

Single by 3OH!3

from the album Omens
- Released: July 10, 2012
- Recorded: 2012
- Genre: Dance-pop; electropop; dubstep
- Length: 3:32
- Label: Photo Finish
- Songwriters: Sean Foreman; Nathaniel Motte

3OH!3 singles chronology
"Touchin' on My" (2011)	"You're Gonna Love This" (2012)	"Youngblood" (2012)

Music video
- "You're Gonna Love This" on YouTube

"You're Gonna Love This" is a song by American hip-hop duo 3OH!3. It was released on July 10, 2012, as the lead single from their fourth studio album Omens.

== Background ==
The song is energetic and utilizes autotune, reminiscent of their 2009 hit "Don't Trust Me". In contrast to that song's reference to Helen Keller, "You're Gonna Love This" includes the lyric "the girl was biting on my lips like Jeffrey Dahmer." The song mentions picking up a girl at the bar and how the night goes on from there with the duo singing "I'll buy you a round, if you come close, Turn up the sound, turn the lights down, Give me a chance, I will take her home with me."

== Release ==
3OH!3 originally premiered the single exclusively during their UStream chat on July 9, 2010, before it officially released as the lead single from Omens the following day. Speaking about selecting the track as the lead single from Omens, Sean Foreman stated, "I think it's a good introduction to the album and hopefully opens up the path for other songs on Omens that we're excited for people to hear." A remix version was released in December 2012, as part of the Take Action charity compilation album, where proceeds went to the It Gets Better Project and other Sub City charities. The song was featured on the American superhero television series, Arrow.

== Artwork ==
The artwork for "You're Gonna Love This" was designed by Andrew Kimmell and Nicholas Motte. The cover appears to be divided into 4 triangular sections. The bottom section is seen to be a pyramid with a river running through it, whilst in the centre of the artwork an eye template is featured with the 3OH!3 logo in the middle. The title "You're Gonna Love This" is below, with the single's album title: Omens featured above the eye and logo and below a triangle.

== Critical reception ==
Professional ratings
Review scores
Source	Rating
PopCrush	3/5 stars

Scott Shetler of PopCrush stated, "The track seems to borrow heavily from the David Guetta model, using slow-building verses to work up to an eventual synth explosion [...] it's a much better song than 3OH!3's last offering, 'Do or Die'." Newsday remarked, "the Colorado duo is taking its pop more seriously on 'You're Gonna Love This' (Photo Finish), which takes an edgier route to dance-floor domination, throwing in dubstep breakdowns and a more aggressive beat with the fun." Kelly Gonsalves of The Pop Break called the song "the worst track" off Omens and wrote, "a pretty cheesy dance club beat that sounds like a very poor attempt at earning radio play."

== Music video ==
The duo released a teaser video for "You're Gonna Love This" on August 13, 2012, ahead of its official premiere. It was officially released on August 15, 2012, and was directed by Isaac Ravishankara. It was filmed at Planet Hollywood in Las Vegas.

=== Synopsis ===
The video opens with one of the band's members next to a girl at Planet Hollywood. She's married, and hides her ring when he starts hitting her up. Then the second guy walks up and hits on her, and this means war. Both of the men do trick shots throughout the video to win back the girl, including a soccer ball down an escalator. While the trio were going down the adjacent escalator, the soccer ball from earlier was still there. At the end of the video, he throws a ball down to the pool from the roof of the building, but the other man throws another one from higher up in a helicopter, and the video shows another man approach her, who looks like Tom Cruise in Risky Business. She leaves with him. After the song ends, the video cuts to the same escalator where the ball remained.

== Charts ==
Chart performance for "You're Gonna Love This"
Chart (2012)	Peak position
Australia (ARIA)	32
Canada Hot 100 (Billboard)	87
South Korea International Chart (GAON)	18
US Bubbling Under Hot 100 (Billboard)	25

== Release history ==
Release dates for "You're Gonna Love This"
Region	Date	Format	Label	Ref.
Canada	July 10, 2012	Digital download	Photo Finish	
New Zealand	July 10, 2012	Digital download	Photo Finish	
Norway	July 10, 2012	Digital download	Photo Finish	
Ireland	July 10, 2012	Digital download	Photo Finish	
Belgium	July 10, 2012	Digital download	Photo Finish	
Italy	July 10, 2012	Digital download	Photo Finish	
Sweden	July 10, 2012	Digital download	Photo Finish	
United States	July 10, 2012	Digital download	Photo Finish	
United Kingdom	July 10, 2012	Digital download	Photo Finish	
Finland	August 1, 2012	CD single	Photo Finish	
United States	August 14, 2012	Mainstream airplay	Photo Finish	
