= Lindsey Stomp =

EP by Lindsey Stirling
- Released: 5 November 2010
- Recorded: 2010
- Genres: Dubstep; classical crossover; classical; electro house; trance
- Length: 10:21
- Label: Lindsey Stirling
- Producer: Marko G

Lindsey Stirling chronology
Lindsey Stomp (2010)	Lindsey Stirling (2012)

Lindsey Stomp is the debut extended play (EP) released by American violinist and recording artist Lindsey Stirling. The EP was officially released on November 5, 2010, two months after Stirling's participation on the fifth season of America's Got Talent. The EP included three tracks ("Transcendence", "Song of the Caged Bird" and "Spontaneous Me") which would later be included on her debut studio album.

== Track listing ==
All tracks are written by Lindsey Stirling and Marko G, and all produced by Marko G.

No.	Title	Length
1.	"Transcendence"	3:46
2.	"Song of the Caged Bird"	3:06
3.	"Spontaneous Me"	3:29
Total length:		10:21
