= Omens (3OH!3 album) =

Studio album by 3OH!3
- Released: June 18, 2013
- Recorded: 2012–2013
- Genre: Dance-pop
- Length: 38:16
- Label: Photo Finish; Atlantic
- Producer: 3OH!3; Greg Kurstin; Silas; Joseph Trapanese

3OH!3 chronology
Streets of Gold (2010)	Omens (2013)	Night Sports (2016)

Singles from Omens
- 1. "You're Gonna Love This" Released: July 10, 2012; 2. "Youngblood" Released: November 13, 2012; 3. "Back to Life" Released: March 5, 2013

Omens is the fourth studio album by American electronic music duo 3OH!3. The album was released on June 18, 2013. The album debuted at number 81 on the Billboard 200 chart, selling 5,423 copies in its first week.

== Background ==
3OH!3 worked and recorded their fourth album in their basement studio in Boulder, Colorado. According to the duo, they decided to "go back to basics" and not to overthink the songs they were writing out. Sean Foreman stated that they "eliminated some cooks from the kitchen" which allowed the duo to make decisions they wouldn't make with more people. On June 22, 2012, Nathaniel Motte announced via Twitter the title of the album to be Omens. Originally set for release on October 30, 2012, Motte revealed a new release date for the album on Twitter, set for December 4. However, on December 1, Motte announced that the album would be delayed with no timetable for a release following a decision change made by their record label. The album was officially released on June 18, 2013.

They embarked on a fall tour from August to October 2012, and were joined by Sammy Adams, Outasight and Silas. The duo performed at Warped Tour from June to August 2013. In support of the album, they also headlined the Journeys Noise Tour from October to November 2013, and were joined by The Summer Set, Wallpaper. and New Beat Fund.

== Composition ==
The album was mainly produced by 3OH!3, with additional help from Greg Kurstin, Silas and Joseph Trapanese. The duo wrote a total of 28 songs for the album. "You're Gonna Love This" is described as "a more poppy song" by Foreman and features a dubstep breakdown. In contrast, "Back to Life" is described as the album's mellowest track, featuring piano chords. The track "Two Girlfriends" contains pop-culture references to the likes of Skrillex, Lindsay Lohan and Rick Santorum.

== Singles ==
In May 2012, the duo began releasing songs from the album with "Do or Die" being the first song released for streaming. The lead single "You're Gonna Love This" was released on July 10, 2012, and the music video was released on August 15. The second single "Youngblood" was released on November 13, 2012, along with a music video. The third single "Back to Life" was released on March 5, 2013, and the music video was released on the same day.

== Critical reception ==
Professional ratings
Aggregate scores
Source	Rating
Metacritic	55/100
Review scores
Source	Rating
AllMusic	3/5 stars
Alternative Press	3/5 stars
Rolling Stone	2/5 stars

Upon its release, Omens received mixed reviews. At Metacritic, which assigns a weighted average out of 100 from ratings and reviews from mainstream critics, the album received an average of 55, indicating "mixed or average reviews", based on 4 reviews. Matt Collar of AllMusic said of the album "when 3OH!3 stick to the anthemic, glorification/satirization of their own lifestyle, the good certainly outweighs the bad on Omens." Jon Caramanica of The New York Times described the album "clangorous", while highlighting the album's "puerile" material. Caroline Feeney of Vox stated, "Overall, the album has a cohesive flow." In a negative review, Nick Catucci of Rolling Stone claims that the album contains "stale references", while highlighting the song "Two Girlfriends", in which Catucci claimed the song "took its inspiration from the Beastie Boys". Alternative Press remarked, "Sometimes it works, other times it just sounds bitter and gratuitous."

== Track listing ==
All tracks are written by Sean Foreman and Nathaniel Motte, with additional writers noted.

Omens – Standard edition
No.	Title	Writer(s)	Producer(s)	Length
1.	"Omens"		3OH!3	1:37
2.	"Eyes Closed"	Ronald Jackson	3OH!3; Jukebox^{[a]}	4:40
3.	"You're Gonna Love This"		3OH!3	3:31
4.	"Black Hole"		3OH!3	3:28
5.	"Make It Easy"		3OH!3	3:58
6.	"Youngblood"	Greg Kurstin	3OH!3; Kurstin	3:23
7.	"Live for the Weekend"		3OH!3	3:53
8.	"Back to Life"	Kurstin	3OH!3; Kurstin	3:45
9.	"Hungover"	Mark Maxwell	3OH!3; Silas	4:07
10.	"Two Girlfriends"		3OH!3	2:55
11.	"Do or Die"	Joseph Trapanese	3OH!3; Trapanese	3:59
Total length:				38:16

Omens – Deluxe edition
No.	Title	Producer(s)	Length
12.	"Slow Motion"	3OH!3	3:47
13.	"Go Fuck Yourself"	3OH!3	3:06
14.	"New Girl"	3OH!3	3:21
15.	"I've Become"	3OH!3	3:12
Total length:			51:42

Omens – Japan special edition
No.	Title	Writer(s)	Producer(s)	Length
12.	"Bang Bang"	Matt Squire	3OH!3; Squire	3:32
13.	"Slow Motion"		3OH!3	3:47
14.	"Go Fuck Yourself"		3OH!3	3:06
15.	"New Girl"		3OH!3	3:21
16.	"The Northern Sky"	Squire	3OH!3; Squire	3:32
17.	"I've Become"		3OH!3	3:12
18.	"My First Kiss" (featuring Kesha - Chuckie Remix)	Lukasz Gottwald; Benjamin Levin	Dr. Luke; Benny Blanco; Fabian Lenssen; Chuckie; Silvio Ecomo	4:00
Total length:				51:42

Note

- ^{^[a]} signifies an additional producer

== Personnel ==
3OH!3

- Sean Foreman – vocals, mixing, engineering, recording
- Nathaniel Motte – vocals, mixing, engineering, recording; piano, programming, and keyboards on "Bang Bang"

Additional contributors

- Chris Gehringer – mastering
- Joseph Trapanese – mixing, engineering, and recording on "Do or Die"
- Greg Kurstin – engineering on "Youngblood" and "Back to Life"
- Jesse Shatkin – engineering on "Youngblood" and "Back to Life", additional engineering on "You're Gonna Love This"
- Silas – engineering and recording on "Hungover"
- Guy Luxe – engineering and recording on "I've Become"
- Matt Squire – bass, guitar, and programming on "Bang Bang"
- Jukebox – additional engineering on "Eyes Closed"
- Jesse Cronan – additional engineering on "Make It Easy"
- Larry Goetz – additional engineering on "Bang Bang"
- Steve Tippeconic – engineering assistance on "Bang Bang"

== Charts ==
Chart performance for Omens
Chart (2013)	Peak position
Japanese Albums (Oricon)	137
US Billboard 200	81
US Top Dance/Electronic Albums (Billboard)	5
