= Beautiful Times =

Single by Owl City featuring Lindsey Stirling

from the EP Ultraviolet
- Released: April 8, 2014
- Studio: Sky Harbor Studios, Owatonna, Minnesota
- Genre: Electropop
- Length: 3:24
- Label: Republic
- Songwriters: Adam Young; Lindsey Stirling
- Producer: Young

Owl City singles chronology
"Good Time" (2012)	"Beautiful Times" (2014)	"Tokyo" (2014)

Lindsey Stirling singles chronology
"Beyond the Veil" (2014)	"Beautiful Times" (2014)	"Shatter Me" (2014)

Music video
- "Beautiful Times" on YouTube

"Beautiful Times" is a song by American electronica project Owl City. The song features American violinist Lindsey Stirling and was released on April 8, 2014, as the lead single from his fourth EP, Ultraviolet.

== Background ==
In early 2014, Young revealed the album artwork for his single, "Beautiful Times", through his Instagram account. On April 4, 2014, Owl City released a teaser for "Beautiful Times". The song was written by Young and Lindsey Stirling, while Young also handled production. The track runs at 136 BPM and is in the key of A major, according to the sheet music published at Musicnotes.com, by Alfred Music Publishing. Young's range in the song spans from the notes E4 to A5. The song has been described as an "upbeat" track. The song features Lindsey Stirling who played violin on the track. According to Young, "Beautiful Times" was the first track he wrote for the EP when he got home from tour. About the song's meaning and working with Stirling, Young stated:

"It is an anthem for those who search for strength to rise above hardship. I was honoured to work with yet another of my favourite artists, Lindsey Stirling, who was kind enough to grant me the honour of featuring her. I hope you enjoy the song as much as I enjoyed creating it."

== Critical reception ==
Professional ratings
Review scores
Source	Rating
Winnipeg Free Press	3/5 stars

Steve Adams of Winnipeg Free Press said the song "is a pleasant, inoffensive piece of electro-pop that you can imagine being played over the closing credits of coming-of-age teen movie." Christian Rockafeller of Music Times called the music video "a gorgeous and whimsical cinematic tale." Musically, he praised Stirling's contribution to the track describing it as "inimitable and impressive."

== Music video ==
On June 26, 2014, the music video for "Beautiful Times" premiered via Rolling Stone. Speaking about the video he stated, "I've been on a few sets where everyone is on edge and it throws the whole thing off. A positive atmosphere really makes all the difference in the world." The music video showcases a young boy sleeping in his bedroom when his toys and room suddenly comes to life, while clips of Young and Stirling performing the song are featured throughout the video.

== Credits and personnel ==
Credits adapted from AllMusic and digital liner notes.

- Owl City – composer, lyricist, primary artist, producer, mixing, recording
- Lindsey Stirling – composer, lyricist, featured artist, violin
- Shinnosuke Miyazawa – recording
- Robert Orton – mixing

== Charts ==
Chart performance for "Beautiful Times"
Chart (2014)	Peak position
CIS Airplay (TopHit)	177
Japan (Japan Hot 100)	91
South Korea International (GAON)	48
US Pop Digital Song Sales (Billboard)	26

== Release history ==
Release history for "Beautiful Times"
Region	Date	Format	Label	Ref.
Various	April 8, 2014	Digital download; streaming	Republic	
