= Shatter Me (song) =

Single by Lindsey Stirling featuring Lzzy Hale

from the album Shatter Me
- Released: 21 April 2014
- Genre: Dubstep; classical crossover; electro house; EDM
- Length: 4:40 (album version)
- Label: BridgeTone
- Songwriter(s): Lindsey Stirling; Dia Frampton; Mark Maxwell
- Producer(s): SILAS

Lindsey Stirling singles chronology
| "Beautiful Times" (2014) | "Shatter Me" (2014) | "Master of Tides" (2014) |

"Shatter Me" is a song composed and performed by American violinist Lindsey Stirling for her second studio album of the same name, and features vocals from American rock singer Lzzy Hale, the lead singer of American rock band Halestorm. The song was written and composed by Stirling, Dia Frampton, and the song's producer, Mark Maxwell, under his production moniker SILAS. The themes explored in "Shatter Me" were based in part on Stirling's experiences with an eating disorder. It became Stirling's first charting airplay single in November 2014 when it entered the Billboard Adult Pop Songs chart at number 39. Prior to that, it had peaked at number one on the Classical Digital Songs chart and number 10 on the Dance/Electronic Digital Songs chart, as well as charting in Germany at number 59.

== Composition ==
The second single of the album was co-written by Stirling and her friend Dia Frampton, the song was originally written and produced by Mark Maxwell (also called by the name of SILAS). It was not only Stirling's first lyrics composed by her but "Shatter Me" was also Stirling's first collaboration to be included on one of her own studio albums. On an interview with blabbermouth.net Stirling told the media: "This song is very, very — obviously — different for a Lindsey Stirling track, because I've never written lyrics before, I've never gotten to blatantly say what I feel."

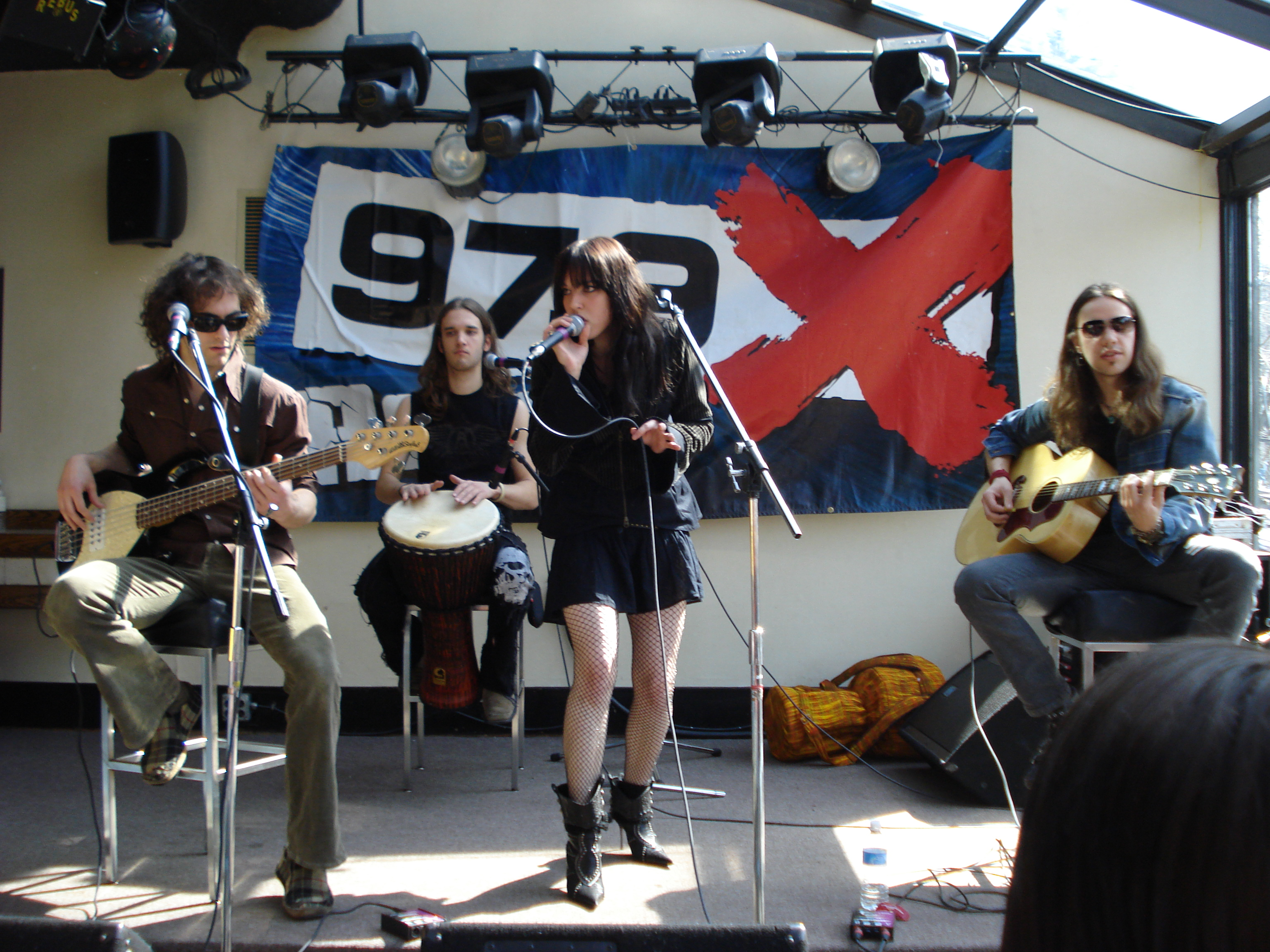
Lzzy Hale, member of the band Halestorm, sang the lyrics of the song.

According to Stirling, she had never heard of Lzzy Hale or Halestorm before but she needed a rock-star female vocalist. In an interview, Stirling stated "It was so important for me to find the right singer for it, because I had in my mind the idea of who I wanted. I love vocalists like Hayley Williams from Paramore and Amy Lee from Evanescence, so I really wanted a powerhouse, rock-star female vocalist."

On an interview with azcentral.com Stirling described Lzzy Hale as an "energetic performer". About the writing of the lyrics, Stirling wrote to azcentral.com that "for some reason, I had this little burst of inspiration. I just saw the image that is on my album cover. I saw a ballerina on a music box. It was a snow-globe music box. And she has a very stark expression but she's perfect and flawless and poised. And basically, that ballerina, I related so strongly to her because there was a time in my life when I was surrounded by this shell that I had basically built around myself, this image of perfection because I was so obsessed with being what I thought everyone else wanted me to be and I realized one day that I was so unhappy because I was a slave to my own control." On another interview with newmediarockstars.com Stirling explained the theme of the song according to her own experience:

The whole theme of the overall album is about breaking free and learning(...) It all started kind of with the theme of "Shatter Me" – I had to break free from the shell that I put over myself, and so that’s why it’s "Shatter Me."

According to Stirling, "Shatter Me" epitomizes the restrictions that world puts on us and shows how difficult it is to break out of old habits and have the courage to step out of our comfort zones into the light.

== Release and promotion ==
On April 9, Stirling posted on her PledgeMusic account three teaser pictures of the upcoming "Shatter Me" music video, only the persons who had pre-ordered the album had access to this images. A week later the "Shatter Me - Studio Behind The Scenes" video was released in which Stirling talked about recording with the musician and singer Lzzy Hale and how did they finish knowing each other. Fragments of the song could be heard for moments in the video. On April 18 Stirling posted on her Pledge account a video of herself having prosthetic makeup for her second single-music video. The single was released on iTunes on April 21 but it wasn't until two days later that the music video was released on YouTube.

=== Live performances ===
On April 29, Stirling played live two songs of her new album: the instrumental version of "Shatter Me" and "Take Flight" at Barnes & Noble. The instrumental version of the single was also performed on the Lindsey Stirling 2014–2015 Tour as the last song of the track list, but at the Nokia Theatre in Los Angeles on May 15, Stirling performed the final song with Lzzy Hale live. On the same month Stirling performed the single live at The Kennedy Center on Washington, D.C. On June 17, Stirling performed live at the CBS Radio Boston lounge. Two days later, she performed live at the Mix 107.9 studio. Both of these performance were presented with the support of Drew Steen and Jason Gaviati. On July 15 Stirling performed with Hale at Good Morning America and on August 7 both performed live again at America's got Talent, being the first time for Stirling to go back since she was disqualified in the fifth season of 2010.

== Music video ==
The music video was filmed at YouTube Space L.A in only one week, according to Stirling. The music video for "Shatter Me" was released on Stirling's YouTube account on April 23. The video showed two different situations, in first place Stirling appeared as a ballerina inside a glass globe of a music box. On the other side Lzzy Hale was presented as a clock-girl who's always fixing things. The theme of the story is centered on the ballerina who hopes that someone will shatter the glass and free her, but she finds out that she is the only one who can break the glass. The video was released without any prior advertisement. Still, the video was a success as it accumulated more than 1.3 million views in less than 24 hours, becoming one of Stirling's more successful YouTube music videos. The video was directed by EVERDREAM and produced by James Khabushani. A seven-minute behind-the scenes music video was released on May 20, 2014, of Stirling explaining the producing and directing of the music video. The "Shatter Me" music video is Stirling's most successful music video of 2014, and as of January 17, 2021 it has accumulated more than 120 million views.

=== Child of Light version ===
On May 9, an instrumental version of "Shatter Me," called "Child of Light," was released. The song was part of the soundtrack of the Ubisoft fantasy game Child of Light. The video showed Stirling dressed as the protagonist of the game: Aurora, a small princess with powers against the dark, running through the forest. At the end of the video a small propaganda of the video was shown and the voice of Stirling at the back informed the viewers about the game.

== Charts ==
"Shatter Me" debuted at number 39 on the Billboard Adult Pop Songs chart for the week ending November 8, 2014, becoming Stirling's first single to enter an American airplay chart.

| Chart (2014–15) | Peak position |
|---|---|
| Germany (GfK) | 59 |
| Japan (ZIP Dance Hits 20) | 3 |
| US Adult Pop Airplay (Billboard) | 34 |
| US Classical Digital Songs (Billboard) | 1 |
| US Dance/Electronic Digital Songs (Billboard) | 10 |

=== Year-end charts ===
| Chart (2014) | Position |
|---|---|
| US Billboard Dance Electronic Digital Songs | 48 |
| Billboard Classical Digital Songs | 1 |

== Certifications ==
| Region | Certification | Certified units/sales |
|---|---|---|
| United States (RIAA) | Platinum | 1,000,000^{‡} |
^{‡} Sales+streaming figures based on certification alone.
