= Lindsey Stirling (album) =

Studio album by Lindsey Stirling
- Released: 18 September 2012 (iTunes); 25 September 2012 (CD)
- Recorded: 2010–12
- Genres: Dubstep, classical crossover
- Length: 45:11
- Label: BridgeTone
- Producers: AFSHeeN; FIXYN; Marko G; Poet Name Life; Lindsey Stirling (executive)

Lindsey Stirling chronology
| Lindsey Stomp (2010) | Lindsey Stirling (2012) | Shatter Me (2014) |

Singles from Lindsey Stirling
- 1. "Spontaneous Me" Released: May 18, 2011; 2. "Transcendence" Released: July 29, 2011; 3. "Electric Daisy Violin" Released: November 3, 2011; 4. "Shadows" Released: January 9, 2012; 5. "Crystallize" Released: February 23, 2012 (US); 6. "Elements" Released: September 18, 2012; 7. "Moon Trance" Released: October 23, 2012; 8. "Song of the Caged Bird" Released: November 29, 2012; 9. "Minimal Beat" Released: November 14, 2013; 10. "Stars Align" Released: February 6, 2014

Lindsey Stirling is the debut studio album by violinist and artist Lindsey Stirling, whose popularity grew from her appearance on America's Got Talent and a large following on YouTube. Her first album of original compositions, it topped the category of Classical Albums and Dance/Electronic Albums in Billboard and reached number 23 on the Billboard 200 and was certified platinum by the RIAA. It also was a success in Europe, earning gold certifications in Poland and Switzerland and platinum certifications in Austria and Germany.

On October 29, 2013, the album was re-released worldwide with bonus tracks and achieved its highest-selling week in the United States, reaching number 23 on the Billboard 200 by selling 10,000 copies. Stirling's single "Crystallize" was certified gold by the RIAA. As of March 2019, Lindsey Stirling has sold over 500,000 copies in the United States and was certified Platinum by the RIAA.

== Background and release ==
The album was recorded over the two years after Lindsey Stirling's appearance on America's Got Talent and was released in 2012. Although Stirling is largely known for her covers, the album is composed almost entirely of her original compositions, featuring Stirling playing violin and backing electronic music on each track created by Stirling and her producers. The album reached number seventy-nine on the Billboard 200, while topping the Billboard Dance/Electronic Albums and Classical Albums charts in the US. It also charted within the top five in Germany, Austria and Switzerland. By April 2013, it had sold 108,000 copies. On October 29, 2013, the album was re-released in the US with 2 bonus tracks, as a Deluxe Edition. The Deluxe Edition with bonus tracks had 3 more exclusive bonus tracks at Target.com and Target retail locations in the US. On February 26, Stirling's album was released in France where it entered in number 17 by selling 4,900 copies.

Stirling's album won platinum certification in Germany and Austria as well as golden certification in Poland and Switzerland. On February 4, 2014, Stirling won her first RIIA golden certification for her single "Crystallize".

Stirling has attributed the success of her album to its multitude of original tracks, rather than covers.

== Reception ==
Professional ratings
Review scores
| Source | Rating |
|---|---|
| Polari | 3/5 stars |
| AllMusic | favorable |

AllMusic's James Christopher Monger wrote that the album "carves out a unique new niche in the classical crossover genre," and called the lead single, "Crystallize", "engaging."

== Accolades ==
The album was nominated for Best Electronic/Dance Album for the Billboard Music Awards.

== Track listing ==
| No. | Title | Writer(s) | Producer(s) | Length |
|---|---|---|---|---|
| 1. | "Electric Daisy Violin" | Lindsey Stirling; Marko G | Marko G | 3:15 |
| 2. | "Zi-Zi's Journey" | Stirling; Afshin Salmani | AFSHeeN | 3:16 |
| 3. | "Crystallize" | Stirling; Marko G | Marko G | 4:18 |
| 4. | "Song of the Caged Bird" | Stirling; Marko G | Marko G | 3:05 |
| 5. | "Moon Trance" | Stirling; FIXYN | FIXYN | 3:55 |
| 6. | "Minimal Beat" | Stirling; Marko G | Marko G | 3:35 |
| 7. | "Transcendence" | Stirling; Marko G | Marko G | 3:45 |
| 8. | "Elements" | Stirling; Marko G | Marko G | 4:07 |
| 9. | "Shadows" | Stirling; Marko G | Marko G | 3:43 |
| 10. | "Spontaneous Me" | Stirling; Marko G | Marko G | 3:29 |
| 11. | "Anti Gravity" | Stirling; Marko G | Marko G | 3:56 |
| 12. | "Stars Align" | Stirling; Jaime Lim Munson | Poet Name Life; Chebacca | 4:47 |
| Total length: | | | | 45:11 |

Tracks 4, 7, and 10 previously appeared on Stirling's 2010 EP, Lindsey Stomp. Tracks 1, 3, and 9 had been released as standalone digital singles in 2011, 2012, and 2012, respectively.

=== Re-release ===
On October 29, 2013, the album was re-released in the US, almost a year after its first official release. The second version of the album consisted mainly of the original setlist, in addition to bonus tracks. The album had some special added bonus tracks if it had been pre-ordered or bought at Target.com or Target retail locations in the US.

On November 8, 2013, Billboard announced that Stirling's studio album had its best sales week ever; by selling 10,000 copies of the extended version of the album; it re-peaked at number 23, passing its previous peak of 79. By May 2014, the album had sold 327,000 copies in total in the United States.

==== Target bonus tracks ====
| No. | Title | Writer(s) | Producer(s) | Length |
|---|---|---|---|---|
| 13. | "Crystallize*" (orchestral version) | Stirling; Marko G | Marko G | 4:35 |
| 14. | "Transcendence" (orchestral version) | Stirling; Marko G | Marko G | 4:22 |
| 15. | "Elements" (orchestral version) | Stirling; Marko G | Marko G | 4:08 |
| 16. | "Crystallize Mashup" (Remix by Wild Children) | Stirling; Marko G | Marko G; Wild Children | 4:47 |
| 17. | "My Immortal*" | Amy Lee; Ben Moody | | 4:11 |
| Total length: | | | | 1:06:34 |

==== Widespread bonus tracks ====
| No. | Title | Writer(s) | Producer(s) | Length |
|---|---|---|---|---|
| 13. | "Elements" (orchestral version) | Stirling; Marko G | Marko G | 4:08 |
| 14. | "Crystallize Mashup" (Remix by Wild Children) | Stirling; Marko G | Marko G; Wild Children | 4:47 |
| Total length: | | | | 54:08 |

Tracks 4, 7, and 10 previously appeared on Stirling's 2010 EP, Lindsey Stomp. Tracks 1, 3, and 9 had been released as standalone digital singles in 2011, 2012, and 2012, respectively.

Songs with * are exclusive at Target.com and Target retail locations in the US.

== Personnel ==
Credits for Lindsey Stirling adapted from liner notes.

- Lindsey Stirling – violin, vocals, executive producer
- AFSHeeN – producer (2)
- Creative Regime – album art
- FIXYN – producer (5)
- Marko G – producer (1, 3, 4, 6–11)
- Devin Graham – photography
- Scott Jarvie – photography
- Poet Name Life – producer (12)
- Chebacca – producer (12)

== Charts ==
=== Weekly charts ===
Weekly chart performance for Lindsey Stirling
| Chart (2012–14) | Peak position |
|---|---|
| Australian Albums (ARIA) | 53 |
| Austrian Albums (Ö3 Austria) | 1 |
| Belgian Albums (Ultratop Flanders) | 121 |
| Belgian Albums (Ultratop Wallonia) | 123 |
| French Albums (SNEP) | 17 |
| German Albums (Offizielle Top 100) | 4 |
| Polish Albums (ZPAV) | 10 |
| Swiss Albums (Schweizer Hitparade) | 5 |
| US Billboard 200 | 23 |
| US Independent Albums (Billboard) | 2 |
| US Top Catalog Albums (Billboard) | 1 |
| US Top Classical Albums (Billboard) | 1 |
| US Top Dance Albums (Billboard) | 1 |

=== Year-end charts ===
2012 year-end chart performance for Lindsey Stirling
| Chart (2012) | Position |
|---|---|
| US Top Classical Albums (Billboard) | 17 |

2013 year-end chart performance for Lindsey Stirling
| Chart (2013) | Position |
|---|---|
| Austrian Albums (Ö3 Austria) | 21 |
| Polish Albums (ZPAV) | 10 |
| Swiss Albums (Schweizer Hitparade) | 23 |
| US Billboard 200 | 161 |
| US Independent Albums (Billboard) | 11 |
| US Top Classical Albums (Billboard) | 2 |
| US Top Dance Albums (Billboard) | 3 |

2014 year-end chart performance for Lindsey Stirling
| Chart (2014) | Position |
|---|---|
| US Billboard 200 | 111 |
| US Independent Albums (Billboard) | 22 |
| US Top Catalog Albums (Billboard) | 37 |
| US Top Classical Albums (Billboard) | 4 |
| US Top Dance Albums (Billboard) | 7 |

2020 year-end chart performance for Lindsey Stirling
| Chart (2020) | Position |
|---|---|
| US Top Classical Albums (Billboard) | 14 |

2021 year-end chart performance for Lindsey Stirling
| Chart (2021) | Position |
|---|---|
| US Top Classical Albums (Billboard) | 20 |

== Certifications ==
| Region | Certification | Certified units/sales |
|---|---|---|
| Austria (IFPI Austria) | Platinum | 15,000^{*} |
| Germany (BVMI) | 3× Gold | 300,000^{^} |
| Poland (ZPAV) | Gold | 10,000^{*} |
| Switzerland (IFPI Switzerland) | Gold | 10,000^{^} |
| United States (RIAA) | Platinum | 1,000,000^{‡} |
^{*} Sales figures based on certification alone.^{^} Shipments figures based on certification alone.^{‡} Sales+streaming figures based on certification alone.

== Music videos ==
List of music videos, showing year released and director
| Title | Year | Director(s) | Notes |
|---|---|---|---|
| "Spontaneous Me" | 2011 | Devin Graham | Uses an abridged version of the song |
| "Transcendence" | 2011 | Nathan D. Lee | Featuring Dalton Skinner as the Computer Tech |
| "Electric Daisy Violin" | 2011 | Devin Graham | Choreographed by Natalie Vilos |
| "Shadows" | 2012 | Lindsey Stirling; Devin Graham | |
| "Crystallize" | 2012 | Lindsey Stirling; Devin Graham | Filmed at the Ice Castles in Silverthorne, Colorado |
| "Elements" | 2012 | Lindsey Stirling; Devin Graham | Makeup by Laura Watkin (water), Joanna Bishop (fire), and Alexandria Murillo (wind) |
| "Moon Trance" | 2012 | Nathan D. Lee | Featuring Stirling's live band members Jason Gaviati and Drew Steen. Makeup by Dale Flink, Joanna Bishop, Shiloh White, Emily Jacobsen |
| "Song of the Caged Bird" | 2012 | Nathan D. Lee | Production designer: Erin Rowley; Gaffer: Brandon Moss |
| "My Immortal" | 2013 | Mason Johnson/ Klepticenter | Lighting design: Jole Reiff. |
| "Elements (Orchestral Version)" | 2013 | NBC and "Dracula" | The video was made in order to promote the TV series Dracula that premiered in October 2013. |
| "Minimal Beat" | 2013 | Mason Johnson/ Klepticenter | Filmed throughout Stirling's 2013 world tour. |
| "Stars Align" | 2014 | Nathan D. Lee | Producer: Jared Cardon. Choreography: Anze Skrube; Effects: PlayfightVFX; Filmed at: YouTube Space LA |
| "Transcendence (Orchestral Version)" | 2014 | Micah Merill | Featuring: Landfill Harmonic. Choreography: Bonnie Story |

== See also ==
- List of number-one electronic albums of 2012 (U.S.)
- List of number-one electronic albums of 2013 (U.S.)
