= Sequoyah Prep School =

American folk music band

Sequoyah Prep School is a five-piece band based out of Olanta, South Carolina. Its members include Justin Osborne, Harrison Boyd, West Jones, Jordan Hicks, Joel Ivey and Johnnie Matthews. The band has a unique style that has influences from folk, rock, and alternative musicians. The band has released several albums, including We Said Hello... and Ghost Town. Ghost Town is their most popular release, selling over 20,000 copies in the first year. The band got their start in 2003, and have continued to produce until their most recent release in 2011, called "Spells". The two most popular songs that the band has produced have been "About Rain" and "Hurricane", as these songs have accumulated more than 800,000 plays on MySpace alone. The band was declared the number-one unsigned band in South Carolina in 2005 by the online music industry.

== Influences and musical style ==
The band has been influenced by many of the 1990s great rock bands, such as Matchbox 20, Counting Crows, and Third Eye Blind. Sequoyah has their folk influence from the band Old Crow Medicine Show, famous for their cover of "Wagon Wheel". The band has developed their own unique style that combines the rock influences with the folk influences to become a hard-to-define genre of music.

== Name change ==
Sequoyah Prep School went on an 8-month break in 2010. During this time, the band looked back on a "life of sin" and said that they have now "entered the darkness and can no longer return" and have begun to dissociate themselves with the music produced when they were called Sequoyah Prep School.

== Touring history ==
The band has toured the Southeast, Northeast, and Midwest. Sequoyah has shared the stage with artists such as Anathallo, Anberlin, Better Than Ezra, Colour Revolt, Cool Hand Luke, Corey Smith, Phantom Planet, Quiet Drive, and Umbrellas. The notable venues in which they perform include the New Brookland Tavern in Columbia, South Carolina.

== Instrumentation ==
- Justin Osborne - vocals, acoustic guitar, mandolin, piano
- Harrison Boyd - drums
- West Jones - guitar, vocals, banjo, piano
- Jordan Hicks - guitar, banjo, vocals
- Johnnie Matthews - bass

== Discography ==
We Said Hello... (2008)

1. "On the Ground"
2. "I"ll Find You"
3. "I'll Stay"
4. "Hurricane"
5. "501"
6. "Eyes Closed"
7. "The Coast"
8. "I Saw You Walking"
9. "Love/Hate"
10. "On My Mind"
11. "Because of You"

Ghost Town (2008)

1. "Apple Pie (Maybe Tonight)"
2. "Maybe I'm In"
3. "Holy City"
4. "Way Back Home"
5. "Magnolia"
6. "Too Late"
7. "Nobody but You"
8. "Live Forever"
9. "Lucille"
10. "Listening"
11. "Old No. 4"

"Weights Are Heavy" (2005)

1. "Mike Mouzon"
2. "About Rain"
3. "Birch"
4. "Change Is Better"
5. "Drown"
6. "Hey Amanda"
7. "Sense & Sensibility"
8. "Something Special"
9. "Wait"
10. "Wanted Man"
