= List of Billboard number-one electronic albums of 2013 =

These are the albums that reached number one on the Billboard Dance/Electronic Albums chart in 2013.

== Chart history ==
Key
| † | Indicates best-performing album of 2013 |

| Issue date | Album | Artist | Reference |
|---|---|---|---|
| January 5 | Wild Ones | Flo Rida | |
| January 12 | Wild Ones | Flo Rida | |
| January 19 | Wild Ones | Flo Rida | |
| January 26 | Wild Ones | Flo Rida | |
| February 2 | Wild Ones | Flo Rida | |
| February 9 | Anything in Return | Toro y Moi | |
| February 16 | Blow the Roof | Flux Pavilion | |
| February 23 | Wild Ones | Flo Rida | |
| March 2 | Ultra Dance 14 | Various artists | |
| March 9 | Lindsey Stirling | Lindsey Stirling | |
| March 16 | Amok | Atoms for Peace | |
| March 23 | Amok | Atoms for Peace | |
| March 30 | Amok | Atoms for Peace | |
| April 6 | Amok | Atoms for Peace | |
| April 13 | Amok | Atoms for Peace | |
| April 20 | The North Borders | Bonobo | |
| April 27 | Overgrown | James Blake | |
| May 4 | Free the Universe | Major Lazer | |
| May 11 | #willpower | will.i.am | |
| May 18 | #willpower | will.i.am | |
| May 25 | Haunted House | Knife Party | |
| June 1 | Haunted House | Knife Party | |
| June 8 | Random Access Memories † | Daft Punk | |
| June 15 | Random Access Memories † | Daft Punk | |
| June 22 | Random Access Memories † | Daft Punk | |
| June 29 | Random Access Memories † | Daft Punk | |
| July 6 | Random Access Memories † | Daft Punk | |
| July 13 | Random Access Memories † | Daft Punk | |
| July 20 | Random Access Memories † | Daft Punk | |
| July 27 | Random Access Memories † | Daft Punk | |
| August 3 | Random Access Memories † | Daft Punk | |
| August 10 | Random Access Memories † | Daft Punk | |
| August 17 | Random Access Memories † | Daft Punk | |
| August 24 | Random Access Memories † | Daft Punk | |
| August 31 | Random Access Memories † | Daft Punk | |
| September 7 | Random Access Memories † | Daft Punk | |
| September 14 | Random Access Memories † | Daft Punk | |
| September 21 | Random Access Memories † | Daft Punk | |
| September 28 | Atmosphere | Kaskade | |
| October 5 | True | Avicii | |
| October 12 | Get Wet | Krewella | |
| October 19 | True | Avicii | |
| October 26 | True | Avicii | |
| November 2 | True | Avicii | |
| November 9 | True | Avicii | |
| November 16 | Recharged | Linkin Park | |
| November 23 | Matangi | M.I.A. | |
| November 30 | Artpop | Lady Gaga | |
| December 7 | Artpop | Lady Gaga | |
| December 14 | Artpop | Lady Gaga | |
| December 21 | Artpop | Lady Gaga | |
| December 28 | Artpop | Lady Gaga | |
