= Sent by Ravens =

American rock band

Background information
- Origin: South Carolina
- Genres: rock, post-hardcore, christian rock
- Years active: 2006–2012, 2025–present
- Label: Tooth & Nail
- Members: Zach Riner; James (Jamie) Windham; Andy O'Neal; James "JJ" Leonard, Jr. Dane Andersen
- Past members: Jon Arena; Aaron Moses
- Website: sentbyravens.com

Sent by Ravens is a post-hardcore band from South Carolina. Their debut EP was released in 2007, and they have since released a following EP and two full-length albums.

== History ==
=== Formation and early years (2006–2009) ===
Sent by Ravens was formed in January 2006 by James (Jamie) Windham (bass), Andy O'Neal (guitar) and Zach Riner (vocals). In August 2007, while searching for a drummer, Windham found Dane Andersen through a video he posted of himself playing on YouTube. Andersen in turn recommended his friend James "JJ" Leonard, Jr. as a second guitarist.

The group released two EPs independently in 2007 and 2008.

=== Our Graceful Words (2009–2010) ===
In August 2009, the band signed to Tooth & Nail Records, on which they released their debut studio album Our Graceful Words in April 2010. The album charted at No. 35 on Billboard Top Heatseekers. In support of the album Sent by Ravens toured with artists including Papa Roach, Nonpoint, and Emery.

=== Mean What You Say and hiatus (2011–2012) ===
On February 28, 2012, the band released their second studio album, Mean What You Say.

Since their hiatus began on August 1, 2012, several members of the band have joined or formed other bands. In October 2012, Riner and Leonard announced that they had formed a punk rock band called Bad Talk, which they would be pursuing full time. They have recorded two demos which can be found on the band's Facebook page. In December 2012, "We're All Liars" was named the No. 1 Song of 2012 on TVU's Ten Most Wanted Countdown.

=== Reunion and possible new music (2025–present) ===
On November 8, 2025, the band posted a new profile picture on all of their social media platforms. Then, on November 12, they posted a visualizer consisting of a voicemail that Jamie sent out to Zach Riner, as well as updated their cover photo on Facebook. Ten days later, on November 18, they posted another voicemail visualizer with it being sent to Andy.

On January 3, 2026, the band posted a short video to its Instagram account showing them playing in a field with previously unreleased music in the background.

On the 15th of February, the band posted a link to their new website on all social media accounts, which features a countdown ending on February the 23rd at 12:00PM EST.

== Brave Future (2017-present) ==
In 2017, Riner and Windham went on to work on a project called "Brave Future" working and writing with producer David Bendeth on an EP of songs that can be found on Spotify.

On February 13, 2018, Brave Future released their lead single "Down Here". On April 2, 2018, a second single "Reinvent" was released.

DISCOGRAPHY:

- Down Here - Single (2018)
- Reinvent - Single (2018)
- Outline - Single (2018)
- Repair - Single (2018)
- Know Thyself - Single (2019)
- Merciless - Single (2019)
- Mettle - Single (2020)
- The Water - Single (2020)
- We Don't Care - Single (2020)
- Down Here (Demo Version) (as part of Demo EP) (2024)
- I Will Let You Down (as part of Demo EP) (2024)
- Runaway (as part of Demo EP) (2024)

== Members ==
Lineup

Zach Riner — vocals
James (Jamie) Windham — bass guitar
Andy O'Neal — lead guitar
James "JJ" Leonard Jr. — rhythm guitar, backing vocals
Dane Andersen — drums

Former Members

Jon Arena - bass guitar
Aaron Moses — drums
Derick Ward — drums

== Discography ==
=== Studio albums ===
Release Date	Title	Label	Peak Chart Positions				
Release Date	Title	Label	US	US Rock	US Christ.	US Hard Rock	US Heat.
April 20, 2010	Our Graceful Words	Tooth & Nail Records	—	—	—	—	35
February 28, 2012	Mean What You Say	Tooth & Nail Records	179	41	10	13	—

=== EPs ===
Release date	Title
March 12, 2007	Sent by Ravens EP
July 6, 2008	The Effects of Fashion and Prayer EP

=== Singles ===
Year	Title	Peak Chart Position		Album
Year	Title	Christian Rock	Christian CHR	Album
2009	"Trailer vs. Tornado"	—	—	The Effects of Fashion and Prayer EP
2010	"New Fire"	1	—	Our Graceful Words
2010	"An Honest Heart"	—	—	Our Graceful Words
2010	"Trailers vs. Tornadoes"	2	—	Our Graceful Words
2010	"Beautiful List"	2	—	Our Graceful Words
2010	"Salt and the Light"	—	20	Our Graceful Words
2012	"We're All Liars"	6	—	Mean What You Say
2012	"Mean What You Say"	12	28	Mean What You Say
2012	"Learn From the Night"	7	—	Mean What You Say
2012	"Best in Me"	19	36	Mean What You Say

=== Music videos ===
- "Trailers Vs Tornado"
- "New Fire"
- "We're All Liars"
