= Susto (band) =

American indie rock band

SUSTO
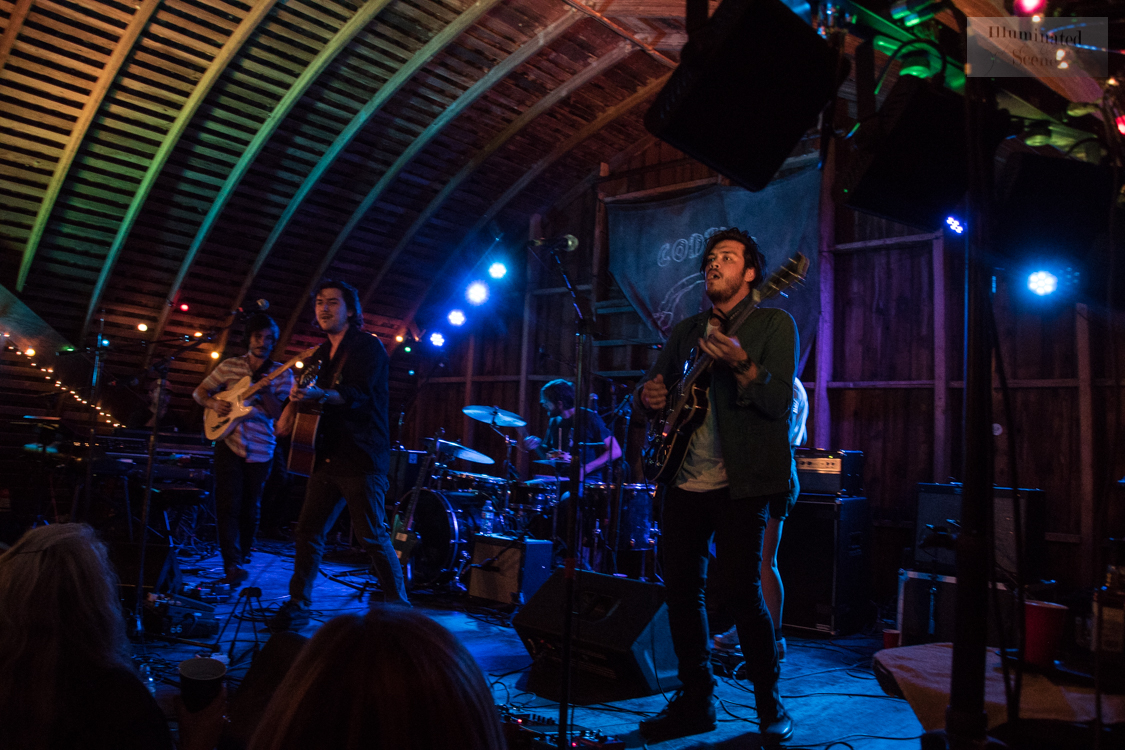

Background information
- Origin: Charleston, South Carolina, USA
- Genres: Indie rock, americana, alt country
- Years active: 2013–present
- Members: Justin Osborne; Marshall Hudson; Kevin Early; Johnny "Hammerhead" Delaware; Ian Klin
- Past members: Dries Vandenberg; Jordan Hicks; Corey Campbell; Jenna Desmond; Taylor McCleskey; Eric Mixon; Gordon Keiter
- Website: www.sustoisreal.com

Susto (which the band usually capitalizes as SUSTO) is an American indie rock band from Charleston, South Carolina.

The name of the band is from the Spanish word "susto", meaning "an intense fear understood as a condition of the soul", reflecting the Cuban roots of some of the band, as well as being drawn from letters in the band leader's name.

== History ==
Susto began in 2014 with the release of a self-titled album on the record label Hearts & Plugs. Susto released their second full-length album titled & I'm Fine Today on ACID BOYS and Missing Piece Records. Their third album, Ever Since I Lost My Mind, was released on February 22, 2019, on Rounder Records. A fourth album, Time in the Sun, was released on October 29, 2021 with New West Records. Their fifth album, My Entire Life, was released on July 28, 2023, preceded by singles "My Entire Life", "Hyperbolic Jesus", and "Mermaid Vampire".

In January 2017, Susto performed at Paste Magazine's Paste Studio, New York City, New York; where they performed their songs Surf Day, I Found You, The Same Damn Time, and Hard Drugs. The session's recording can be found on YouTube.

In April 2018, Susto performed at the High Water Festival in North Charleston, South Carolina.

In March 2019, Susto performed at Antone's Georgia Theatre in Austin, TX for the South by Southwest festival in Austin, Texas.

In May 2026, Susto released their album Susto Stringband: Volume 2 which features live recordings of the band. The album also features guests such as Joshua Hedley, Morgan Wade, and Madeline Dierauf. The music of this album focuses on live acoustic "Front Porch" style bluegrass recordings.

== Discography ==
=== Studio albums ===
- SUSTO (2014) (Hearts & Plugs)
- & I'm Fine Today (2017) (Missing Piece Records, ACID BOYS)
- Ever Since I Lost My Mind (2019) (Rounder Records)
- Time in the Sun (2021) (New West Records)
- My Entire Life (2023)
- Susto Stringband: Volume 1 (2025)
- Sustto Stringband: Volume 2 (2026) (Missing Piece Records)

=== Live albums ===
- Live from the Australian Country Music Hall of Fame (2015) (Missing Piece Records)
- Live From Codfish Hollow (2024) (New West Records)

=== EPs ===
- Hearts & Plugs 7s, Vol 1 (2015) (Hearts and Plugs)
- SUSTO Stories (2018) (Missing Piece Records, ACID BOYS)

=== Singles ===
- Chillin' On The Beach With My Best Friend Jesus Christ (2016) (Hearts and Plugs)
- R.I.P. Santa (2017) (Missing Piece Records, ACID BOYS)
