= Beyond the Veil (song) =

Single by Lindsey Stirling

from the album Shatter Me
- Released: 24 March 2014
- Recorded: 2013–14
- Genre: Classical crossover; electropop; dubstep
- Length: 4:11 (album version); 4:52 (YouTube version)
- Label: BridgeTone
- Songwriter(s): Lindsey Stirling

Lindsey Stirling singles chronology
"Crystallize" (2012)	"Beyond the Veil" (2014)	"Beautiful Times" (2014)

"Beyond the Veil" is the first single from Lindsey Stirling's second studio album Shatter Me. The song was released digitally on March 24, 2014, and the official YouTube video was released a day later. The video accumulated half a million views in its first day. The song topped the Billboard Classical Digital Songs chart for the first four weeks. This single is the first in the track list of the twelve songs that make up her second studio album and, according to Stirling, it was the first song she composed on her album. The behind-the-scenes video was released a week later, on March 31, where Stirling explained the message of the song and its composition.

== Charts ==
Chart (2014)	Peak position
US Classical Digital Songs (Billboard)	1
US Dance/Electronic Digital Songs (Billboard)	22
