= Drew Steen =

American professional drummer (born 1986)

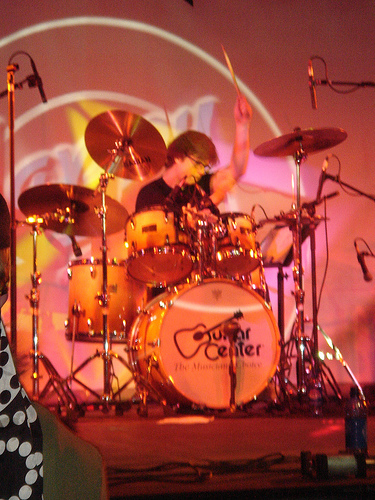

Background information
- Birth name: Drew Sanderson Steen
- Also known as: The Kid
- Born: May 13, 1986 (age 38)
- Origin: Lincoln, Nebraska, USA
- Genres: Indie rock
- Occupation: Drummer
- Years active: 1996–present
- Labels: Sub Pop

Drew Sanderson Steen is an American professional drummer.

== Early life ==
Steen was born in Lincoln, Nebraska. He decided to start drumming at the age of 10 after watching his older brother Ryland Steen (currently the drummer of America and the former drummer of Reel Big Fish).

== Career ==
In 2005 Steen moved to Southern California to pursue a career as a professional drummer. In 2006 he toured with the indie rock band The Elected, and in 2007 he toured with Annie Stela who opened for Paolo Nutini. In the time he has been in California, Steen has also worked with bands such as Suburban Legends, Paperface, Victory Season, The Secret Mind, and Upperville and was a member of the band Power Animal.

He has played on Demi Lovato's records and toured on their first tour. In 2009 Steen toured with David Archuleta on his Christmas From The Heart tour.

Steen is now on tour with Lindsey Stirling as her drummer.
