= Crystallize (Lindsey Stirling song) =

Single by Lindsey Stirling

from the album Lindsey Stirling
- Released: September 18, 2012
- Recorded: 2011–12
- Genre: Dubstep; classical crossover
- Length: 4:18 (album version); 5:00 (YouTube version)
- Label: BridgeTone
- Songwriter(s): Lindsey Stirling
- Producer(s): Marko G.

Lindsey Stirling singles chronology
"Shadows" (2012)	"Crystallize" (2012)	"Beyond the Veil" (2012)

"Crystallize" is a song by American violinist Lindsey Stirling from her self-titled studio album Lindsey Stirling. The song was released as a music video on YouTube on February 23, 2012. The video had more than 42 million views at the end of the year, and was the eighth-most watched video of 2012. The song became Stirling's album's lead single due to its success. The song appeared on three Billboard charts and, according to Nielsen SoundScan, by April 2013 it had reached 234,000 digital sales. On February 4, 2014, almost two years after the release of the video, "Crystallize" earned Stirling's first RIAA certified gold record by selling 500,000 copies in the United States. At the end of 2013, "Crystallize" finished first on the year-end Billboard Classical Digital Songs chart. On July 27, 2014, the official music video reached 100 million views, being Stirling's first YouTube video to do so.

== Meaning ==
Speaking with Artistdirect, Stirling explained the background to the song: "It has a pretty deep meaning," she said. "Basically, it's about creating inner beauty in yourself first. It all comes back to research being done by a scientist (Dr. Masaru Emoto) who studied the crystallization of water."

"Basically, he'd test out water and look at it at a magnified level as it crystallized in different environments," Stirling continued. "If it was in positive environments where good things were being spoken to it, the crystals came out beautiful. Whereas if negative things were said to these little vials of water, these crystals were these jagged shapes that were meaningless."

"When we surround ourselves eternally with positivity and we create healthy and positive environments and we do good things for people and ourselves, we're made up of 70 percent water so the crystals in your body create actual literal inner beauty," Stirling added. "That's what 'Crystallize' is about. It's about taking control of your environment, creating beauty within yourself, and therefore creating beauty outside. I know that's pretty deep, but that's what it's about."

== Music video ==
The music video was filmed at the ice castles of Silverthorne, Colorado. It was co-directed by Lindsey Stirling herself and Devin Graham, with Graham as the videographer. It had over 42 million views at the end of 2012, and it reached number 8 on the list of the most-watched YouTube videos of that year. Since "Crystallize" was released, Stirling's popularity has increased considerably and it is the 2nd most-watched video on her YouTube channel with over 239 million views, behind Roundtable Rival which has more than 280 million views, both as of December 2020.

== Charts and certifications ==
The song was a success worldwide, especially in the United States; on the Classical Digital Songs chart it held the number one spot for 39 non-consecutive weeks and, until March 8, 2014, it had been on the chart for 75 weeks. Crystallize was also a moderate hit in Europe as it entered the Top 40 category in four European countries: Germany, Austria, Switzerland and Bulgaria.

=== Charts ===
Chart (2012–2013)	Peak position
US Hot Dance/Electronic Songs (Billboard)	28
US Classical Digital Songs (Billboard)	1
Bulgarian Singles Charts	37
Austrian Singles Charts	28
German Singles Charts	39
Swiss Singles Charts	37
French Singles Charts	184

=== Year-end charts ===
Chart (2013)	Position
US Classical Digital Songs (Billboard)	1
US Dance/Electronic Songs (Billboard)	78

=== Certifications ===
Region	Certification	Certified units/sales
Germany (BVMI)	Gold	150,000^{‡}
United States (RIAA)	Platinum	1,000,000^{‡}
^{‡} Sales+streaming figures based on certification alone.
