= Lindsey Stirling discography =

Cataloguing of published recordings by Lindsey Stirling

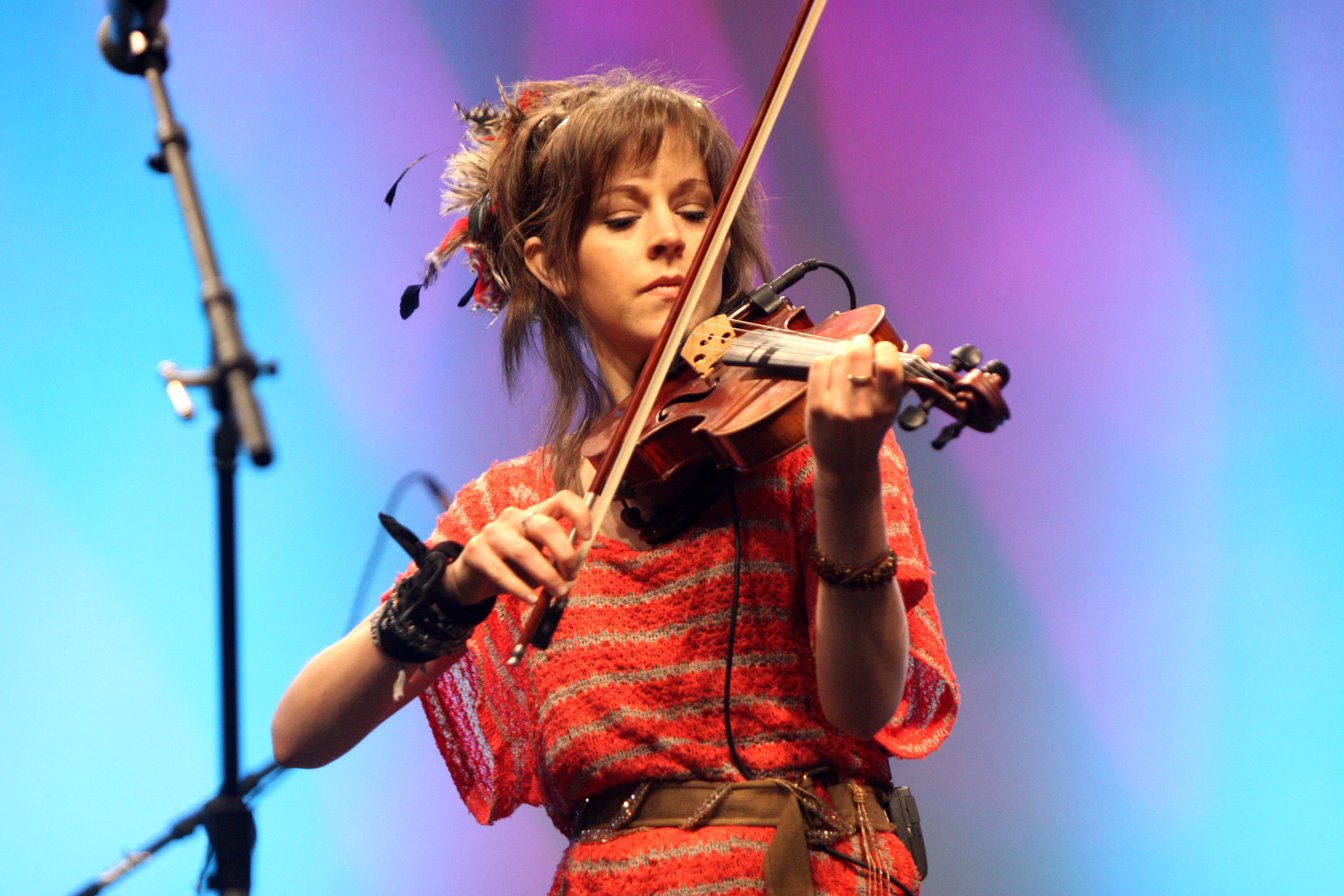
- Stirling performing at VidCon 2012
- Studio albums: 7
- EPs: 2
- Live albums: 1
- Compilation albums: 1
- Singles: 18
- Video albums: 1
- Music videos: 87

American violinist Lindsey Stirling has released seven studio albums, two extended plays, one video album/live album, 1 compilation album, eighteen singles, and 87 music videos.

== Albums ==
=== Studio albums ===
List of studio albums with selected chart positions, sales and certifications
Title	Details	Peak chart positions									Sales	Certifications
Title	Details	US	US Dance	US Class.	US Indie	AUT	CAN	GER	POL	SWI	Sales	Certifications
Lindsey Stirling	Released: September 18, 2012; Re-released: October 29, 2013; Label: BridgeTone; Format: CD, digital download, LP, streaming	23	1	1	2	1	—	4	10	5	GER: 300,000; POL: 10,000; AUT: 15,000; SWI: 10,000	RIAA: Gold; BVMI: 3× Gold; IFPI AUT: Platinum; IFPI SWI: Gold; ZPAV POL: Gold
Shatter Me	Released: April 29, 2014; Label: Decca, Universal; Format: CD, LP, digital download, streaming	2	1	1	1	3	5	4	12	3	US: 337,000; GER: 200,000	RIAA: Gold; BVMI: Platinum; IFPI AUT: Gold
Brave Enough	Released: August 19, 2016; Label: Lindseystomp, Universal; Format: CD, LP, digital download, streaming	5	1	1	2	5	7	4	22	3	US: 45,000	
Warmer in the Winter	Released: October 20, 2017; Label: Lindseystomp, Concord; Formats: CD, LP, digital download, streaming	22	—	1	—	43	90	52	—	40		RIAA: Gold
Artemis	Released: September 6, 2019; Label: Lindseystomp, BMG; Formats: CD, LP, digital download, streaming	22	1	1	1	22	76	19	25	13		
Snow Waltz	Released: October 7, 2022; Label: Concord; Formats: CD, LP, digital download, streaming	197	—	1	—	—	—	88	—	90		
Duality	Released: June 14, 2024; Label: Concord, Lindseystomp; Formats: CD, LP, digital download, streaming	84	—	1	15	—	—	15	—	28		
"—" denotes a recording that did not chart or was not released in that territory.

=== Compilation albums ===
List of compilation albums
Title	Details
Best of Christmas Classics	Released: November 22, 2023; Label: Universal; Formats: Digital download, streaming

=== Video albums ===
List of video albums with selected chart positions
Title	Details	Peak chart positions	
Title	Details	GER	GER DVD
Lindsey Stirling: Live from London	Released: August 7, 2015; Label: Lindseystomp, Vertigo, Capitol, Universal; Formats: DVD, CD, digital download, streaming	8	1

== EPs ==
List of extended plays
Title	Details
Lindsey Stomp	Released: November 5, 2010; Label: Lindseystomp; Formats: Digital download, streaming
Lose You Now	Released: July 17, 2021; Label: BMG; Formats: LP

== Singles ==
List of singles with selected peak chart positions and certifications
Title	Year	Peak chart positions								Certifications	Album
Title	Year	US	US AC	US Dance	US Dance Dig.	US Class. Digital	AUT	GER	SWI	Certifications	Album
"Crystallize"	2012	—	—	28	17	1	28	39	37	RIAA: Platinum	Lindsey Stirling
"Beyond the Veil"	2014	—	—	—	22	1	—	—	—		Shatter Me
"Shatter Me" (featuring Lzzy Hale)	2014	—	—	—	10	1	—	59	—	RIAA: Platinum	Shatter Me
"Take Flight"	2014	—	—	—	—	1	74	—	—		Shatter Me
"Master of Tides"	2014	—	—	—	—	—	—	—	—		Shatter Me
"Hallelujah"	2015	81	—	—	—	—	—	—	—		Non-album single
"The Arena"	2016	—	—	—	—	—	—	—	—		Brave Enough
"Something Wild" (featuring Andrew McMahon)	2016	—	—	—	34	1	—	—	—		Brave Enough and Pete's Dragon
"Prism"	2016	—	—	—	—	—	—	—	—		Brave Enough
"Hold My Heart" (featuring ZZ Ward)	2016	—	—	—	—	—	—	—	—		Brave Enough
"Love's Just a Feeling" (featuring Rooty)	2017	—	22	—	—	—	—	—	—		Brave Enough
"Dance of the Sugar Plum Fairy"	2017	—	10	—	—	—	—	—	—		Warmer in the Winter
"Christmas C'mon" (featuring Becky G)	2017	—	21	—	—	—	—	—	—		Warmer in the Winter
"Warmer in the Winter" (featuring Trombone Shorty)	2018	—	—	—	—	—	—	—	—		Warmer in the Winter
"Carol of the Bells"	2018	—	7	—	—	—	—	—	—		Warmer in the Winter
"Underground"	2019	—	—	35	6	—	—	—	—		Artemis
"The Upside" (solo or featuring Elle King)	2019	—	—	—	—	—	—	—	—		Artemis
"Artemis"	2019	—	—	40	9	—	—	—	—		Artemis
"What You're Made Of" (featuring Kiesza)	2020	—	—	—	—	—	—	—	—		Azur Lane Soundtrack
"Lose You Now"	2021	—	—	—	3	—	—	—	—		Lose You Now
"Joy to the World"	2022	—	11	—	—	—	—	—	—		Snow Waltz
"Sleigh Ride"	2023	—	14	—	—	—	—	—	—		Snow Waltz
"Kashmir"	2023	—	—	—	—	—	—	—	—		Non-album single
"Carol of the Bells" (Live from Summer Tour 2023) (Note: The single included "Carol of the Bells" (Live from Summer Tour 2023), "Sleigh Ride" and "Carol of the Bells".)	2023	—	—	—	—	—	—	—	—		Non-album single
"Heavy Weight"	2023	—	—	—	—	—	—	—	—		Beat Saber Original Soundtrack Vol. 6
"Eye of the Untold Her"	2024	—	—	—	—	—	—	—	—		Duality
"Inner Gold" (featuring Royal & the Serpent)	2024	—	—	—	—	—	—	—	—		Duality
"You're a Mean One, Mr. Grinch" (featuring Sabrina Carpenter)	2024	—	10	—	—	—	—	—	—		Warmer in the Winter (Deluxe Edition)
"Unfolding" (featuring Rachel Platten)	2025	—	—	—	—	—	—	—	—		Duality (Deluxe Edition)
"Evil Twin" (featuring Shuba)	2025	—	—	—	—	—	—	—	—		Duality (Deluxe Edition)
"—" denotes releases that did not chart or were not released in that country.

=== Collaborative singles ===
- 2011: "By No Means" (with Eppic)
- 2011: "Party Rock Anthem" LMFAO cover (with Jake Bruene and Frank Sacramone)
- 2012: "Starships", Nicki Minaj cover (with Megan Nicole)
- 2012: "Grenade", Bruno Mars cover (with Alex Boye and the Salt Lake Pops)
- 2013: "1 Original, ONE Cover" – "Some Kind of Beautiful" and "Thrift Shop" (with Tyler Ward)
- 2013: "Living Room Sessions" – "Daylight" and "I Knew You Were Trouble" (with Tyler Ward and Chester See)
- 2013: "Mission Impossible" (with The Piano Guys)
- 2013: "Radioactive", Imagine Dragons cover (with Pentatonix)
- 2013: "Star Wars Medley" (with Peter Hollens)
- 2013: "All of Me" (with John Legend)
- 2014: "Papaoutai" (with Pentatonix)
- 2014: "Beautiful Times" (with Owl City)
- 2014: "Loud" (with Jessie J)
- 2015: "Sounds Like Heaven" (with Marina Kaye)
- 2015: "Pure Imagination" (with Josh Groban and The Muppets)
- 2015: "Les Misérables Medley", covers
- 2015: "Hallelujah" (with Joy Enriquez)
- 2016: "Dying for You" (with Otto Knows and Alex Aris)
- 2016: "Afterglow"(with Vicetone)
- 2016: "The Show Must Go On" (with Celine Dion)
- 2018: "Hi-Lo" (with Evanescence)
- 2018: "Stampede" (with Alexander Jean)
- 2019: "Voices" (with Switchfoot)
- 2020: "We Are Warriors" (with Avril Lavigne)
- 2020: "Use My Voice" (with Evanescence)
- 2020: "Invincible" (with Escape the Fate)
- 2021: "Warbringer" (with TheFatRat)
- 2023: "Long Way Home" (with Walk off the Earth)
- 2023: "Breathe with Me" (with Lacey Sturm)
- 2023: "Next to Me" (with Afsheen, Olaf Blackwood & Medeea)
- 2024: "Forever & Ever" (with Lacey Sturm)
- 2024: "Remembering Sunday – ATL's Version" (with All Time Low & Lisa Gaskarth)
- 2024: "Too Late" (with MisterWives)
- 2025: "On the Road Again" (with Walk off the Earth)
- 2026: "Don't You Blink" (with Two Friends and Tyler Braden)

== Music videos ==
Abbreviated list of music videos
Date	Title	Director(s)	YouTube views^{(2017-07-18)}	Notes
May 18, 2011	"Spontaneous Me"	Devin Graham	31,073,728	Original video.
July 29, 2011	"Transcendence" (Original version)	Nathan D. Lee	21,539,973	Original video.
September 8, 2011	"On the Floor Take Three"	Unknown	15,017,655	Medley.
September 21, 2011	"River Flows in You" (with Debi Johanson)	Devin Graham	29,515,598	Coverof the piece by Yiruma.
October 11, 2011	"By No Means" (with Eppic)	Sean Haggel	2,611,858	Original video.
November 3, 2011	"Electric Daisy Violin"	Devin Graham	45,999,005	Original video.
November 26, 2011	"Zelda Medley"	Devin Graham	32,855,112	Medley of Zelda game music by Koji Kondo.
December 7, 2011	"Silent Night"	Devin Graham	6,419,237	Cover.
December 19, 2011	"Celtic Carol"	Devin Graham	9,915,542	Original video.
January 9, 2012	"Shadows"	Devin Graham	88,852,079	Filmed at the Ensoul warehouse in Salt Lake City, Utah.
February 2, 2012	"Lord of the Rings Medley"	Devin Graham	44,875,401	Music by Howard Shore. Filmed in New Zealand.
February 23, 2012	"Crystallize"	Devin Graham	175,794,018	Filmed at Ice Castles in Silverthorne, Colorado
April 3, 2012	"Skyrim" (with Peter Hollens)	Devin Graham	67,303,011	Medley of Skyrim game music by Jeremy Soule
May 7, 2012	"We Found Love" (with Alisha Popat)	Devin Graham	44,388,659	Cover of the song by Calvin Harris feat. Rihanna, with changed lyrics. Filmed in Kenya, sponsored by VenTribe.
Jul 5, 2012	"Grenade" (with Alex Boye, Nathaniel Drew and the Salt Lake Pops)	Unknown	9,814,018	Cover of the song by Bruno Mars.
June 10, 2012	"Starships" (with Megan Nicole)	Devin Graham	14,203,390	Filmed at the Ensoul warehouse in Salt Lake City, Utah
July 31, 2012	"Phantom of the Opera"	Lindsey Stirling (also edited, and produced)	42,811,090	Locations: Capitol Theater in Salt Lake City and the Velour in Provo, Utah
August 14, 2012	"Come With Us" (with Can't Stop Won't Stop)	Devin Graham	3,892,516	Original video
September 5, 2012	"Game of Thrones" (with Peter Hollens)	FifGenFilms	14,106,211	Medley of Game of Thrones music
September 18, 2012	"Elements" (Original version)	Devin Graham	93,669,886	Filmed at the Ensoul warehouse in Salt Lake City, Utah
October 23, 2012	"Moon Trance"	Nathan D. Lee	50,891,389	Original video
November 5, 2012	"Assassin's Creed III"	Jace Leroy	31,077,504	Medley of Assassin's Creed III music
November 29, 2012	"Song of the Caged Bird"	Nathan D. Lee	17,943,246	Original video
December 14, 2012	"What Child Is This"	Scott Winn	12,488,498	Cover
December 7, 2012	"Just Dance 4"	Unknown	8,264,419	Cover
January 15, 2013	"Thrift Shop" (with Tyler Ward)	Unknown	17,646,656	Cover of the song by Macklemore & Ryan Lewis feat.Wanz.
January 22, 2013	"Mission Impossible" (with The Piano Guys)	Paul Anderson and Tel Stewart	17,061,173 (Note: Number of views on The Piano Guys YouTube channel); 9,343,959 (Note: Number of views on the Lindsey Stirling YouTube channel)	Piano Sonata No. 16, K. 545, first movement The Piano Guys arrangement and original material written by Steven Sharp Nelson, Al van der Beek, Jon Schmidt, and Stirling
March 12, 2013	"Radioactive" (with Pentatonix)	FifGenFilms	151,674,761	Cover of the song by Imagine Dragons
May 23, 2013	Halo theme (with William Joseph)	Devin Graham	18,303,102	Cover. Video features cosplay by members of 405th.com.
July 21, 2013	"My Immortal"	Klepticenter Productions	23,214,851	Cover of the song by Evanescence
October 11, 2013	"Elements" (Orchestral version)	NBC	15,383,649	A video remix for the TV show Dracula on NBC
October 26, 2013	"All of Me" (with John Legend)	FifGenFilms	89,034,656	Performance of John Legend's song
November 14, 2013	"Minimal Beat"	Klepticenter Productions	16,683,016	Filmed in various cities globally
December 4, 2013	"O Come, Emmanuel" (with Kuha'o Case)	Blue Kite Cinema	5,482,560	Original video. The text is written By Stephen Stirling
February 6, 2014	"Stars Align"	Nathan D. Lee	22,429,406	Filmed in studio with SFX Effects by PlayFight. Premiered on Yahoo Music before YouTube.
March 14, 2014	"Transcendence" (Orchestral version)	Unknown	16,560,564	In association with The Leader in Me Program, and the Landfill Harmonic.
March 25, 2014	"Beyond the Veil"	Joe Sill	30,711,613	Original video
April 23, 2014	"Shatter Me" (with Lzzy Hale)	Joe Sill	71,426,723	Original video. Concept by Joe Sill & Lindsey Stirling. Featuring Lindsey Stirling & Lzzy Hale. Includes announcement of her new album of the same name.
August 14, 2014	"Master of Tides"	UE Boom	58,910,346	Original video. A spontaneous live performance.
October 20, 2014	"Roundtable Rival"	Everdream	101,177,635	Original video.
November 18, 2014	"Dragon Age"	Joe Sill	19,842,727	Cover of the Dragon Age: Inquisition Main Theme. Promotional video for Dragon Age: Inquisition.
January 28, 2015	"Senbonzakura"	Everdream	12,508,030	Cover of the song by Kurousa-P/WhiteFlame.
March 6, 2015	"Les Misérables Medley"	Chris Le	4,822,936	Medley of Les Misérables.
March 23, 2015	"Take Flight"	Joe Sill	21,116,876	Original video.
April 3, 2015	"Into The Woods Medley"	Joe Sill	4,741,483	Medley of Disney's Into the Woods.
May 7, 2015	"Pure Imagination" (with Josh Groban and The Muppets)	Dan Carr & Bobby Mosser	2,631,556	Cover of the song from Willy Wonka and the Chocolate Factory.
July 7, 2015	"Bright" (with Echosmith)	Unknown	3,044,251	Performance of Echosmith's song.
September 9, 2015	"We Are Giants" (with Dia Frampton)	Bryan Chojnowski & Grant Olin	8,343,813	Original video.
December 7, 2015	"Hallelujah"	Unknown	38,368,854	Cover of the song by Leonard Cohen
January 7, 2016	"Heist"	DJay Brawner	4,681,127	Original video.
February 4, 2016	"Dying For You" (Otto Knows ft. Lindsey Stirling and Alex Aris)	Alex Wessely	3,148,176	Single by Otto Knows.
April 19, 2016	"Night Vision"	Unknown	2,286,440	Original video. Also announces her summer tour and new album.
June 28, 2016	"The Arena"	Unknown	25,931,048	Original video.
August 2, 2016	"Something Wild" (Featuring Andrew McMahon)	Unknown	11,694,552	Original video.
September 9, 2016	"Spider-Man Theme" (with Lang Lang)	Unknown	2,129,254	Cover.
October 14, 2016	"Prism"	Unknown	6,266,554	Original video.
November 16, 2016	"Hold My Heart" (feat. ZZ Ward)	Unknown	11,455,677	Original video.
March 6, 2017	"Love's Just A Feeling" (feat. Rooty)	Lindsey Stirling	4,432,720	Original video.
March 13, 2017	"Beauty and the Beast"	Unknown	9,775,042	Medley of Beauty and the Beast.
March 20, 2017	"Hold My Heart" (feat. Phelba)	Unknown	2,553,775	Paid promotion for HP.
May 11, 2017	"Lost Girls"	Unknown	8,531,745	Cover of the song by Kygo and Selena Gomez
May 24, 2017	"Forgotten City from RiME"	Unknown	2,213,546	Promotional video for the upcoming video game, Rime.
July 17, 2017	"It Ain't Me" (with Kurt Hugo Schneider)	Unknown	5,873,352	Cover of the song by Kygo and Selena Gomez
October 11, 2017	"Mirage"	Lindsey Stirling	7,027,854	Original video
October 24, 2017	"Dance of the Sugar Plum Fairy"	Unknown	7,662,696	Cover
November 16, 2017	"Christmas C'mon" (feat. Becky G)	Unknown	3,570,696	Original video
December 1, 2017	"Carol of the Bells"	Unknown	10,570,696	Cover
December 13, 2017	"Angels We Have Heard on High"	Unknown	1,570,696	Paid promotion for Mastercard
February 27, 2018	"The Greatest Showman Medley"	Unknown	11,510,704	Medley
June 13, 2018	"Stampede" (with Alexander Jean)	Joshua Shultz	9,536,048	
June 28, 2018	"First Light"	Unknown	11,653,988	Original video
October 19, 2018	"I Wonder As I Wander"	Unknown	7,569,584	
November 19, 2018	"You're A Mean One, Mr. Grinch" (feat. Sabrina Carpenter)	Joshua Shultz & Lindsey Stirling	11,826,294	Original video
November 29, 2018	"Santa Baby"	Joshua Shultz & Lindsey Stirling	3,774,704	Cover
June 21, 2019	"Underground"	Tom Teller	16,450,533	Launch song for the album, Artemis
April 24, 2020	"Sleepwalking"	Lindsey Stirling and Graham Fielder	7,502,345	
August 30, 2019	"Artemis"	Stephen Wayne Mallett & Lindsey Stirling	17,548,334	
September 11, 2019	"The Upside"	Tom Teller & Brodin Plett	3,567,292	Song featuring Elle King
June 23, 2020	"Between Twilight"	Stephen Wayne Mallett & Lindsey Stirling	5,972,962	
September 21, 2020	"Til the Light Goes Out"	Stephen Wayne Mallett & Lindsey Stirling	9,254,216	
November 10, 2020	"Guardian"	Lindsey Stirling	5,584,534	
January 15, 2021	"Lose You Now"	Stephen Wayne Mallett & Lindsey Stirling	4,921,240	Featuring Mako
March 30, 2021	"Wild Rift"	Stephen Wayne Mallett & Lindsey Stirling	1,715,019	For the video game, League of Legends
April 22, 2021	"Lose You Now" (Acoustic)	Stephen Wayne Mallett & Lindsey Stirling	1,338,519	A video for the acoustic version of Lose You Now
July 1, 2021	"Masquerade"	Stephen Wayne Mallett & Lindsey Stirling	3,625,858	Filmed at the Orpheum Theatre, Los Angeles
September 28, 2021	"Rage Beneath The Mountains"	Stephen Wayne Mallett & Lindsey Stirling	1,191,874	For the video game, Genshin Impact
October 12, 2021	"Flame Of Hope"	Lindsey Stirling	1,566,998	For the video game, Tales of Arise
November 17, 2021	"Lords"	Stephen Wayne Mallett & Lindsey Stirling	1,498,195	For the video game Lords Mobile

== TV and film soundtrack appearances ==
Lindsey Stirling music appearances on television and in movies:

TV Show	Year	Song	Notes
Suits	2015	The Scientist (with Tyler Ward)	Season 5, episode 4 - No Puedo Hacerlo
Pete's Dragon	2016	Something Wild (with Andrew McMahon)	End Credits
Barbie: Star Light Adventure	2016	Firefly	
Dirty Dancing	2017	Wipe Out (as featured artist with American Authors)	
Dancing With The Stars	2017	Roundtable Rival	Stirling's Halloween Night Dance
America's Got Talent	2018	Roundtable Rival	Performed live on the final show with Brian King Joseph during Transcends performance
The Chilling Adventures of Sabrina	2019	The Phoenix	Season 2, episode 3 - Chapter Fourteen: Lupercalia
The Umbrella Academy	2019	Phantom of the Opera (Medley)	Season 1, episode 1 - We Only See Each Other at Weddings and Funerals
The Knight Before Christmas	2019	Dance of the Sugar Plum Fairy	
Good Sam	2022	Tesselate	Theme song
Castlevania: Nocturne	2023	I'm Free (with Sydney James Harcourt)	Bonus Track
