= We Are Fury =

Canadian DJ and music production duo

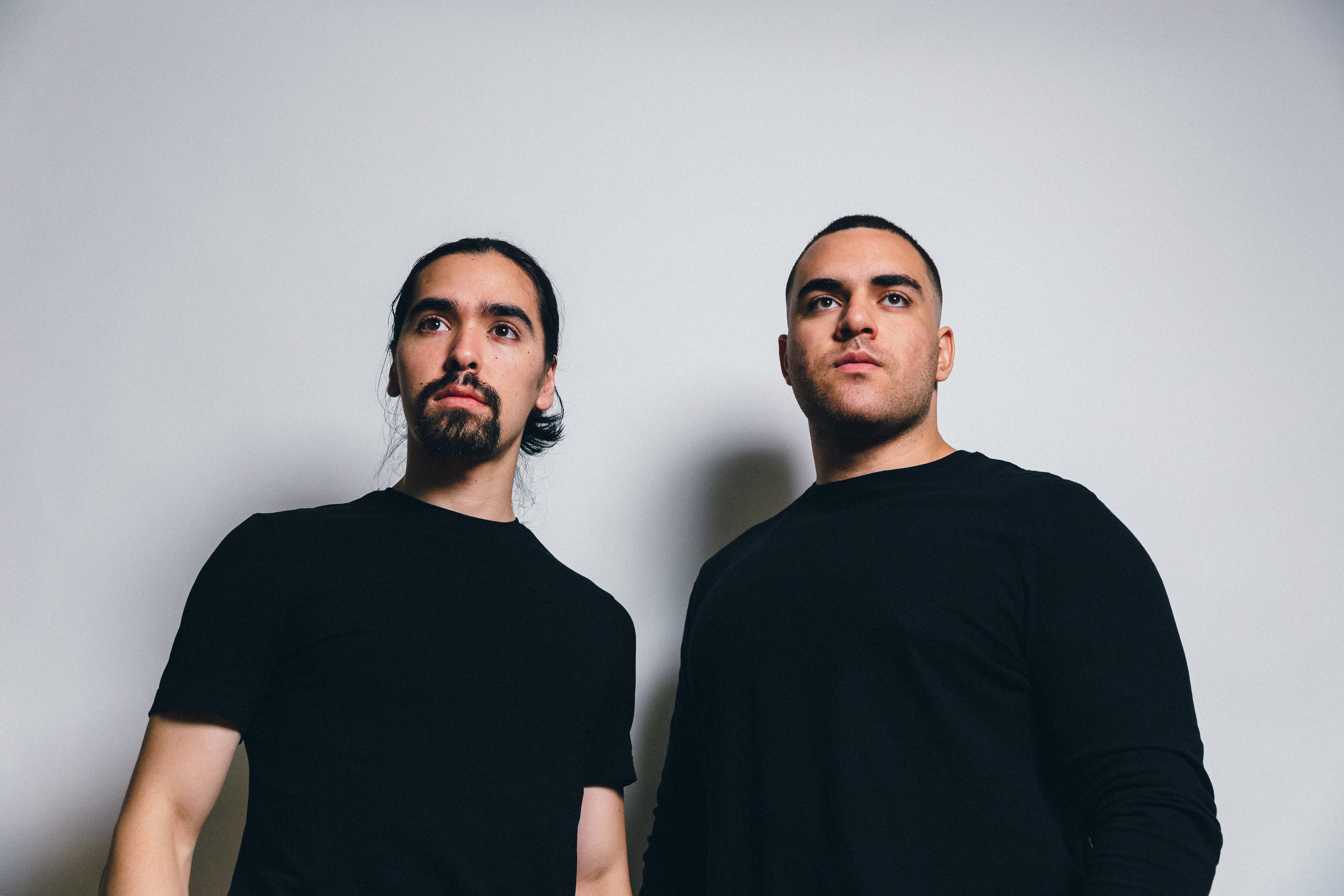
- Stuart Brookes (left) and Joachim Speidel (right) in 2019

Background information
- Also known as: Fury
- Origin: Vancouver, Canada
- Genres: EDM; future bass; trap; midtempo; melodic dubstep
- Occupations: Disc jockeys; record producers; remixers
- Years active: 2016–present
- Labels: Lowly; Ultra; Owsla; Big Beat; ATL; Good Night Bad Time; Artist Intelligence Agency; Otodayo Records; Seeking Blue
- Members: Joachim Speidel
- Past members: Stuart Brookes
- Website: wearefurymusic.com

We Are Fury (stylised as WE ARE FURY, previously known as Fury; stylised as FURY) is a Canadian electronic music project led by Joachim Speidel. It was formed in 2016 as a DJ and production duo by Speidel and Stuart Brookes. Taking inspiration from the feeling their music gave them for their stage name, they are known for their remixes, singles, extended plays (EP), and debut album Duality. We Are Fury's music is primarily electronic dance music (EDM) and contains elements of subgenres such as melodic trap, future bass, midtempo, and melodic dubstep.

Growing up in Vancouver, British Columbia, Speidel and Brookes began writing music individually in high school. They met in 2015 while attending university and formed the duo act Fury. They saw success within the British Columbian music scene, crediting local fans and receiving help from pre-established producers Felix Cartal and Ekali. They released their debut extended play (EP) Signal Fires in 2017 and signed their EPs Dawn and Dusk with the record label Seeking Blue. In 2020, We Are Fury released their debut album Duality via Seeking Blue. Throughout the duo's career, they have signed with record labels Monstercat, Lowly, and Ultra. Their music has surpassed more than 20 million plays on streaming services over the first three years of their career.

We Are Fury write and produce their music in FL Studio, a digital audio workstation (DAW) developed by Image-Line. Speidel and Brookes often work together by sending each other musical projects via the internet or by travelling to a recording studio to compose together. The duo often split workloads equally to use their strengths; Speidel writes and produces while Brookes focuses on sound design and song arrangement. The two listed heavy metal and rock music bands, video game music, and Speidel's roots of North American and Latin music as influences for their music production style.

Speidel and Brookes are known for their live performances; We Are Fury have played at various music festivals and show sets such as Fvded in the Park, Contact Festival, and Stacked Festival. They specialize their DJ sets with unique intro and outros and use well-known songs to influence the crowd. Various notable electronic music artists, including Ekali, Felix Cartal, and Illenium, have supported We Are Fury's musical career. The duo launched their DJ mix series For The Moment in 2018.

== Early life ==
Speidel and Brookes started producing music during their later years in high school. They downloaded FL Studio out of boredom and wrote songs individually with the digital audio workstation. Speidel began writing house music from 2015 to 2016, while Brookes kept using it as a hobby for a couple of years.

Speidel and Brookes met in 2015 during university. Both of them had already had begun producing music independently as solo projects for several years. After working with each other a few times, the two decided to start working together as a duo act as they both worked well together. At the time, the two did not expect the collaborative project to turn into a career. The name "We Are Fury" is a "direct translation of the music" as "it's reflective of the purest human emotions."

The duo credited their rise to local fans within the British Columbian music scene, comparing their success to other Vancouver-based Ekali, Felix Cartal and Vanic. In an interview with Wendel Genosa of Earmilk, Speidel said that the duo saw success within Vancouver's music scene as they had previous involvement within the scene and "we both had production behind us." We Are Fury had advice from Felix Cartal and Ekali about signing music to record labels and touring. Ekali later debuted the duo's song "Mortal" at the Electric Daisy Carnival (EDC) in May 2018.

== Career ==
=== 2016: "Fade Away" and "I'll Be Your Reason" remix ===
On 1 June 2016, Speidel and Brookes released the song "Fade Away", featuring the vocalist Tallyn, under the collaborative alias Fury. The duo had previously released remixes and original songs such as their remix of "Way Back Home" by Mako and their single "Robot Sex". Wendel Genosa of Earmilk described the single as finding "the perfect balance of sweet and melodic and numbingly electrifying" and highlighted the single as an example of Fury being able to "themselves apart as a group creating bangers with an emotional backdrop."

In 2016, Illenium approached Fury to produce a remix of his song "I'll Be Your Reason" after the duo sent his management their remix of Mako's song "Way Back Home". Illenium released his remix album of his debut album Ashes on 16 December 2016. The album included Fury's future bass remix alongside other remixes produced by Synchronice, Just a Gent, Crystal Skies, and Kill Paris. Writing for Your EDM, Rain Robinson stated that Fury's remix was one of his favourites from the album.

=== 2017:Signal Fires, "Kerosene" remix, and "Don't Forget" ===
On 14 July 2017, Speidel and Brookes, under the stage name We Are Fury, released their debut extended play (EP) Signal Fires. The EP contains the future bass and trap songs "Rise", "Signal Fires", "Demons", and "For the Moment" and features the vocalists Alina Renae, Micah Martin, and Fletcher Mills. The duo wrote the lyrics for each song before they recruited any vocalists; they worked with all of the vocalists over the internet, except for Fletcher Mills, whom they worked with in person. Your EDM's Rain Robinson wrote that Signal Fires made "a strong statement" with "the help of some excellent vocalists". One of Earmilk's writers, Wendel Genosa, said that Signal Fires creates "a sonic rollercoaster of emotions" with its combination of "banger[s] and a poignance in their melodies".

On 28 July 2017, shortly after the release of Signal Fires, We Are Fury released a trap remix of the song "Kerosene" by alternative rock band Armors. The band contacted We Are Fury on SoundCloud after hearing the duo's remix of "Way Back Home". Armors presented them an opportunity to remix a song the band had yet to release at the time. An Earmilk writer stated that the remix had done justice to the original track with its combination of "melding soft emotions with vigorous drops". Your EDM complimented its showcase of We Are Fury's "signature bass sound, intricate sub movement, and some subtle brass."

In late-2018, We Are Fury released their future bass single "Don't Forget", featuring vocals from singer Mariah Delage. Alejandro Vega complimented the song's sound design and Delage's performance; he described the song as "a testament to their production style of making passionate, compelling and incredible music." Travis McGovern praised the song's lyrics and synthesisers, writing that We Are Fury created "an ethereal vibe with emotionally charged melodies that will have you crying for your past loves.

=== 2018: "Ascension", "Killing Me Slow", and remixes ===
We Are Fury uploaded a remix of the song "As We Fall" from the League of Legends soundtrack to their SoundCloud account in early 2018. The duo spoke about the inspiration and production of the remix; saying that they were both gamers who were fans of League of Legends and were inspired to rework "As We Fall", keeping away from their "melodic sound" to make something that had "a very dark and heavy drop because we thought it really captured the eeriness of the [original] song." Writing for Your EDM, Travis McGovern talked about the dark-sounding nature of the song: stating that the duo combined "haunting vocal melodies with growling undertones of bass and theatric level percussion". Wendel Genosa of Earmilk noted that We Are Fury "used their talents to add their own flair" to the alternative rock song, saying that "the duo take the original up a notch, adding an adventurous layer of sounds."

In March 2018, We Are Fury released their single "Ascension" as a free download. ThisSongSlaps' Brian Bonavoglia wrote that they "prove[d] once again to be a force to be reckoned with in the bass scene", highlighting the single's "hybrid of both acid and trap". Writing for Earmilk, Edwin Tsang gave positive reception towards the song, noting its sound design, bassline, and synths as highlights within the single. Alongside the single was an announcement that Speidel and Brookes were producing their second extended play; they planned it to release later that year.

We Are Fury released the song "Killing Me Slow" on 25 May 2018; the track is available to download for free through SoundCloud. Production on the single started in late-2017, with three versions of the single existing during writing before the final version was written and released. The duo spoke about the meaning behind the single, stating:

"The song is about being stuck in a relationship where you give more than you're receiving and it begins to wear down on you – we've all been there at some point in time. In the end, it is a reminder that situations of discomfort are only opportunities for growth."

— We Are Fury talking about the story behind "Killing Me Slow".

Writing for EDM.com, Rachel Woods noted the track's mix of trap and pop music as having a "unique hybrid sound"; she highlighted the arrangement of "soft vocals" into the "harder drop" as an example of this. Omar Serrano of Run the Trap lauded the track as an "anthemic trap record [that] will melt deep into your soul as you become raptured in its provocative vocals and sound design." The song amassed more than 150,000 plays through music streaming services within four days of it being released.

On 11 July 2018, American music producer and DJ Lookas released a five-track remix extended play of his Lucid EP via Monstercat. The remix extended play included We Are Fury's future bass remix of Lookas and Krewella's collaborative single "Alarm", alongside other remixes by Bishu, Signal, Zaxx, and Tynan. Pavan Kumar reviewed the remix EP and described We Are Fury's remix as "beautiful", continuing to say that the remix would "take you to a tranquil state, however ensuring you groove to the subtle and bright dub beats." One Run the Trap writer highlighted the duo's remix as a stand-out track, stating that the "atmosphere, energy, and exceptional sound design left quite the impression as I completely fell in love with this record." Jordan Farley later included the remix in the 23rd episode of Run the Trap's "Best Remixes Of The Week" article series.

In February 2018, We Are Fury announced a remix of an Illenium song planned to release later that year. On 18 June 2018, Illenium released his 15-track remix long-play record (LP) for his second album Awake via Seeking Blue. We Are Fury's remix of "Lost", featuring vocalist Emilie Brandt, was included on the remix LP alongside various other artists, including Crystal Skies, Au5, Kompany, and 1788-L. While reviewing the remix LP, Your EDM's Karlie Powell briefly touched on We Are Fury's track; she described it as a "powerful" remix of the original work.

In December 2018, We Are Fury released the first episode of their DJ mix series For The Moment. The duo included five unreleased singles amongst songs by other artists, including Illenium, Kill the Noise, Seven Lions, and Luxide.

=== 2019: "Looking For You", "Memories", and Dawn and Dusk ===
In January 2019, Electronic music producer Ekali began developing a charity music studio to help younger artists who couldn't produce records financially. Ekali accumulated funds for the studio space from an "edit pack" that he released in late-2018, which people could voluntarily donate money. Various other artists supported the studio, including Speidel of We Are Fury, Tails, Juelz and SSOS. Ekali posted progress photos to Twitter, showing Speidel constructing IKEA furniture for the studio space.

On 18 January 2019, We Are Fury collaborated with American electronic music duo act Crystal Skies to release the trap and future bass song "Looking For You". The song featured Los Angeles-based vocalist Pauline Herr and was released via Trap Nation's record label Lowly. We Are Fury first contacted Crystal Skies in 2016, producing an instrumental track in 2018; They brought in Herr to perform vocals on the song after We Are Fury discovered her work through the record label Monstercat. Ekali mastered the song's final mix. The song's lyrics interpret a story of someone grieving the loss of someone important to them, searching for their face hidden in a crowd one last time. Writing for Earmilk, Edwin Tsang praised Herr's lyrical delivery as setting a "frightening tone" for "the mysterious and dark melodic track". An EDM Sauce author described the track as "dripping with pain and emotion", with the "commanding vocals" shaping the song.

In February 2019, We Are Fury uploaded their remix of Ekali and Medasin's song "Forever" to SoundCloud as a free download. The song's lyrics inspired We Are Fury to remixing it into a midtempo song, as they interpreted the lyrics as the song's character speaking to death. Rachel Woods commended the duo's approach on the original track, noting the "heavily distorted" midtempo direction they took the remix. A ThisSongSlaps' writer wrote that the duo delivered a "devastating trap facelift" on top of Elohim's original vocals.

On 10 May 2019, the collaborative single between We Are Fury and Runn titled "Memories" was released. The melodic dubstep song revolves around a character experiencing loss, with lyrics referencing "this old house" and "the photographs of our better years". Runn wrote the song's theme of loss from experiences and imagery, while We Are Fury portrayed her, playing the character, in the cover art looking at Polaroids. Vivian Lin wrote that the song is juxtaposed between We Are Fury's "signature dark sounds with industrial glitchy fills" and Runn's "heartfelt lyricism for an indescribable feeling of emptiness and hope". An EDM.com author also noted the mix between the different styles between the duo's signature sound and Runn's "strong melodies and emotional lyrics." Denver-based electronic music producer Covex later released a remix of "Memories" in September.

We Are Fury released their single "Heart of Mine", featuring vocalist Kobra Paige, as a free download. Record label Lowly released the song on 19 July 2019. In a press release, We Are Fury wrote that the track is themed around the concept of perseverance and "remaining focused on your journey as a person." The duo produced "heavier elements" within the track to act as counterparts to Paige's heavy metal vocals, all while keeping the balance of "melodic sections to develop contrast." The song was meant to be a part of an extended play, though the duo decided to instead release it as part of their debut album. An Earmilk writer noted We Are Fury's use of vocal chops and synthesisers as retaining "a balance of slower and melodic sections" to contrast Paige' vocals that "inspire listeners to find peace, even in their darkest days." ThisSongSlaps described the track as a "vocally driven beauty" that turns into a trap song featuring "a sinister barrage of bass."

During a mid-2019 interview with Daily Hive, We Are Fury announced that shortly after their performance at Fvded in the Park, a collaborative song with Canadian producer Nxsty would release. On 16 August 2019, the collaboration between the duo, Nxsty, and Quebec-based rapper Wasiu, titled "Mortal", was released. We Are Fury contacted Nxsty about collaborating with We Are Fury a year before "Mortal"'s release; They met Wasiu through YouTube's comment section. Writing for Earmilk, Alshaan Kassam said that the collaboration portrayed "a balance between boundary-pushing sound design and melodic lyricism", highlighting Wasiu's vocals as "flowing perfectly in alignment with the mellow beat". EDM.com praised the song as a "sound designers paradise", writing that it was a "perfect example of balance between boundary-pushing sound design and melodic lyricism."

On 30 August 2019, Canadian music producer Dabin released a 17-track remix LP of his second studio album Wild Youth. The remix LP featured various notable remixers, including Trivecta; Crystal Skies; Fransis Derelle; and Duumu. Dabin included We Are Fury's remix of his and French record producer Fytch's song "Altitude" on the remix album; American dubstep producer Ray Volpe also remixed "Altitude".

In September 2019, We Are Fury released their remix of "Takeaway", originally by The Chainsmokers & Illenium, as a free download. This Song Slaps' Brian Bonavoglia wrote that the duo had given the original "a blissful makeover that packs quite the punch while also taking an unexpected turn into the darkside." John Donahue of Mix 247 EDM complimented the remixes ability to turn the original single into "something completely different". In July 2021, Illenium played We Are Fury's remix of "Takeaway" during his Trilogy show set at the Allegiant Stadium in Las Vegas, the highest-seating capacity single-headlining electronic dance music performance in United States history.

On 11 October 2019, We Are Fury released their two-track extended play Dawn via the record label Seeking Blue. It features the singles "Broken", featuring vocalist Luma, and "Don't Know Why", featuring singer Danyka Nadeau. In a press release, the duo said that they wrote the extended play based on "contrast", highlighting their differences in strengths within the creative process of sound design, writing and performing music. In an interview with Dancing Astronaut, Speidel and Brookes said that the arrangement and percussion in "Broken" were the most difficult things to arrange. The two explained that "Broken" was about "someone going out on a limb in a relationship, cautiously hoping the response doesn't leave them disappointed", while "Don't Know Why" was about "the aftermath of a bad relationship". We Are Fury's next extended play, Dusk, was released in December. Both extended plays acted as precursors to We Are Fury's debut album.

In a 2018 interview with Matt Davis of EDM Sauce, We Are Fury stated that because of how well "Demons" did, they had decided to write a second collaboration with Micah Martin. In November 2019, the duo released the collaborative single "Echoes", featuring the Iowa-based vocalist; We Are Fury featured the single on their extended play Dusk. Speidel talked about the production process of the song, stating that the three of them write a track with a "more midtempo yet still melodic drop" after Martin suggested they write something "a bit different" compared to their previous collaboration. Writing for EDM.com, Rachel Woods noted the deviation from the trap production We Are Fury and Martin's collaboration, opting for a midtempo song featuring "big kicks and fluttering glitch elements" alongside high-energy "heavy-hitting bass." ThisSongSlaps praised its production as having the "traditional melodic elements" We Are Fury were usually producing.

=== 2020: "Running Back To You", "Nothing", and Duality ===
In early 2020, We Are Fury released the single "Running Back To You", featuring vocalist Alexa Lusader. The duo released the melodic dubstep track as a promotional single for their debut album. Lusader stated that the song is about the "'love of love' & welcoming it to potentially unhealthy degrees." In an interview with Dancing Astronaut, the duo said they decided to incorporate Lusader's vocals into the song after hearing her performance on a single by Canadian DJ Vincent; We Are Fury and Lusader finished the track while they were in Los Angeles. Brian Bonavoglia described the track as a vocal-driven beauty fuelled by "melodic dubstep growls, marching drums and a silky smooth yet powerful vocal". Rachel Woods wrote that the single showcased "duo's ability to write simple, yet intricate melodies."

On 20 March 2020, We Are Fury released their single "Nothing" as a promotional single from their debut album. The song featured vocals from singer Kyle Reynolds, which tells a story about how "you think is 'it', but ends abruptly and you're left with all these questions." It was supported through Spotify's official editorial playlists, radio broadcasting station SiriusXM, and by other artists such as Illenium and Ekali. Writing for Dancing Astronaut, Rugby Scruggs described Reynolds' vocals as "soulful" and "touching" and said that the song "is the perfect sonic remedy to raise your spirits at home." American DJ and production duo Two Friends supported the song on their DJ mix series Friendly Sessions.

In a July 2019 interview with DJ Mag, We Are Fury said they planned to start writing their debut album in 2020. On 28 August 2020, the duo released their debut album Duality via the record label Seeking Blue. The album contains 15 tracks and features various vocalists, including Tyler Smith of American Metalcore band The World Alive, Micah Martin, Luma, and Gallie Fisher. The duo released "Heart of Mine", "Broken", "Echoes", "Running Back to You", and "Nothing" as promotional singles for the album. The album was in development for two years; We Are Fury wrote it around the concept of duality, which the duo explained is "why the music is half melodic and half heavy." They stated that the album is also about self-acceptance, saying that if "we want to become the best versions of ourselves, we have to reach a moment of self-acceptance." Rachel Woods of EDM.com highlighted the album's versatility in genres, noting the songs "Eyes Wide Open", "Nothing", and "Poison" as having orchestral, dance-pop, and dubstep elements within them.

On 11 December, We Are Fury released a remix album of Duality. The 11-track LP featured remixes from various artists, including Amidy, Aryze, Dryve, Luxide, N3wport, Nikademis, Outwild, Slippy, Slooze, Syence, and Synymata; We Are Fury also included a VIP mix of "Eternal".

=== 2021: "Remember" and Remember (Remixes) ===
On 3 August 2021, We Are Fury released their collaborative single "Remember" with Los Angeles-based songwriter Emlyn. Speidel and Brookes wrote the track while they were writing their debut album, Duality. "Remember" was at first produced as a "melodic" song; the end product was more of a "bassier song". Writing for Dancing Astronaut, Zach Salafia lauded the song as having a "groovy" and "nostalgic sound."

In September, We Are Fury released a "Remember" remix extended play, featuring remixers Maazel, If Found, Caslow, Late June, and Badvoid. We Are Fury released the remixes once per day over five days. Badvoid described his remix as coming "naturally and helped me express my anger and sadness" he had during the COVID-19 pandemic lockdowns in Australia. Reviewing Badvoid remix of "Remember", a Run the Trap writer highly praised its sound design and mixing, calling it a "hard-hitting and inventive remix" that was full of "infectious, fun energy from start to finish."

=== 2021: "Talking To Ghosts", Talking To Ghosts (Remixes), "Belong" and "Belong – VIP" ===
On 13 October 2021 We Are Fury released their collaborative single "Talking To Ghosts" with Nikamedis and SOUNDR.

Also on 13 October 2021 We Are Fury announced a remix competition.

On 23 October 2021 a discord user by the name NO HOPE. was announced the winner of the competition.

On 12 November 2021 We Are Fury released the "Talking To Ghosts" remixes, featuring ZIN, Sam Day, Darby & Blosso, and NO HOPE.

On 17 November 2021 We Are Fury released their collaborative single "Belong" with if found and Stirling.

On 10 December 2021 We Are Fury released the single "Belong – VIP" with if found and Stirling.

=== 2022: "Ithaca", "Poem of a Killer"and "Crown" ===
On 2 February 2022 We Are Fury released the single ithaca.

On 8 April 2022 We Are Fury released their collaborative single "Poem of a Killer" with Elijah Cruise.

On 22 April 2022 We Are Fury released their collaborative single "Crown" with Brassie and Kyle Reynolds, this is the first song We Are Fury released with a music video.

=== 2024-present: Lineup change, Bad Omens remix, Begging For a Host ===
In 2024, We Are Fury remixed the title track of Bad Omens' 2022 album The Death of Peace of Mind. "The Death of Peace of Mind (We Are Fury Patch)" appeared on the band's companion album Concrete Jungle (The OST) released on 31 May 2024 through Sumerian Records.

In August 2026, WE ARE FURY announced that Brookes had departed as a formal member on good terms in late 2024, leaving Speidel as the project's sole member. Brookes remained involved with the project's second studio album, Begging For a Host (released October 30, 2026), contributing songwriting, additional production, mixing, and mastering.

== Artistry ==
We Are Fury's best-known works include the single "Fade Away", featuring vocalist Talyn; Signal Fires, their 2017 debut extended play; and various official remixes for other artists such as Mako and Illenium. The duo have released their music on notable record labels such as Monstercat, Lowly, Ultra, and Seeking Blue. They have amassed more than 20 million streams in their first three years as We Are Fury.

We Are Fury have performed on the main stage of Contact Festival, one of the largest musically formative events in Western Canada. The duo talked about the experience, saying that it was "a dream of ours to play there since we were teenagers, and it was one of those full-circle moments to witness it all unfold". Speidel and Brookes have remarked that they always prepare their DJ sets with specialized intro and outro songs and "staple tracks" to influence the crowd's mood during a live mix. The duo have played at Contact Music Festival in 2018, alongside Galantis, Valentino Khan, and Svdden Death; Stacked Festival in 2019, with Excision, Black Tiger Sex Machine, and Whipped Cream; and Fvded in the Park in 2019, which also featured Joyryde, Elohim, and Felix Cartal.

=== Influences ===
Speidel lists his influences as heavy metal and rock music bands, including Black Sabbath, Iron Maiden, and Metallica. He attributes these influences to the drums and rhythms he incorporates into We Are Fury's music. Brookes was more inspired by video game music, which he credits for his style of melodies. The duo listed their electronic music influences as the "melodic" artists K?d, Illenium, Odesza, Porter Robinson, and Said the Sky. They listed Boombox Cartel, Kompany, and RL Grime as influences for their "heavier" production style. Speidel grew up around music with the concept of social osmosis, which influenced him to mix his North American and Latin roots in his music.

=== Musical style and songwriting ===
We Are Fury are known for their style of melodic trap, future bass, midtempo, and melodic dubstep music. In an interview with Daily Hive, The duo stated that they were venturing to compose film scores and video game music and wanted to work in the music industry for pop music artists. Speidel told DJ Mag that We Are Fury's decision to change how they wrote their music changed style and production when they "realized we had to make music with longevity that people could connect with".

Speidel and Brookes work together by either sending projects to each other while living apart or travelling to a recording studio to write music together. They don't have a specific process for producing a song and often start projects with inspiration, using a melody, sound, or beat as a starting point. Speidel writes "heavier" sound design, writing, and production, while Brookes works on "melodic" sound design and song arrangement. They have both said that they try to balance out their workload to be as equal as possible to "play to our strengths as much as possible." In an interview with Dancing Astronaut, the duo spoke about how important open communication was to their workflow, stating that it was "nice being a duo whose comfortable with communicating openly about what we like and dislike."

Speidel and Brookes use the digital audio workstation FL Studio to make music their music. The duo uses the wavetable synthesizer Serum to make their bass and chords and use the audio plug-in software Valhalla Room to add reverb to their vocals, synthesizers, and percussions. Speidel has used the effects unit Manipulator as a real-time audio buffer unit for sound design and vocal processing.

== Discography ==
=== Albums and EPs ===
Title	Details
Signal Fires	Released: 14 July 2017; Label: Self-released; Format: Digital download; streaming
Memories (Remixes)	Released: 13 September 2019; Label: Seeking Blue; Format: Digital download; streaming
Dawn	Released: 11 October 2019; Label: Seeking Blue; Format: Digital download; streaming
Dusk	Released: 6 December 2019; Label: Seeking Blue; Format: Digital download; streaming
Duality	Released: 28 August 2020; Label: Seeking Blue; Format: Digital download; streaming
Duality (Remixes)	Released: 11 December 2020; Label: Seeking Blue; Format: Digital download; streaming
Duality (Commentary)	Released: 15 February 2021; Label: Seeking Blue; Format: Digital download; streaming
Remember (Remixes)	Released: 3 September 2021; Label: Self-released; Format: Digital download; streaming

==== As a featured artist ====
Title	Details
Way Back Home (Remixes) by Mako	Released: 25 March 2016; Label: Ultra; Format: Digital download; streaming
Ashes (Remixes) by Illenium	Released: 16 December 2016; Label: Seeking Blue; Format: Digital download; streaming
Hourglass (The Remixes) by Mako	Released: 28 April 2017; Label: Ultra; Format: Digital download; streaming
Awake (Remixes) by Illenium	Released: 18 June 2018; Label: Seeking Blue; Format: Digital download; streaming
Lucid (The Remixes) by Lookas	Released: 11 July 2018; Label: Monstercat; Format: Digital download; streaming
Wild Youth (The Remixes) by Dabin	Released: 30 August 2019; Label: Seeking Blue; Format: Digital download; streaming

=== Singles ===
Title	Year	Album	Label
Fury	2016	Non-album singles	Otodayo Records
Robot Sex	2016	Non-album singles	Self-released
Helix	2016	Non-album singles	Self-released
Fade Away (featuring Tallyn)	2016	Non-album singles	Trap Nation
Power	2016	Non-album singles	Otodayo Records
Far Sight (with Jinco, featuring Holly Jade)	2016	Non-album singles	Lowly
Robot Sex	2017	Non-album singles	Self-released
Helix	2017	Non-album singles	Self-released
Waiting (featuring Olivia Lunny)	2017	Non-album singles	Self-released
Don't Forget (featuring Mariah Delage)	2017	Non-album singles	Artist Intelligence Agency
Ascension	2018	Non-album singles	Self-released
Killing Me Slow	2018	Non-album singles	Self-released
Looking For You (with Crystal Skies, featuring Pauline Herr)	2019	Non-album singles	Lowly
Memories (with Runn)	2019	Non-album singles	Seeking Blue
Heart of Mine (featuring Kobra Paige)	2019	Duality	Lowly, Seeking Blue
Mortal (with Nxsty and Wasiu)	2019	Non-album singles	AOV Music
Broken (featuring Luma)	2019	Dawn, Duality	Seeking Blue
Echoes (with Micah Martin)	2019	Dusk, Duality	Seeking Blue
Running Back To You (featuring Alexa Lusander)	2020	Duality	Seeking Blue
Nothing (featuring Kyle Reynolds)	2020	Duality	Seeking Blue
Remember (with Emlyn)	2021	Non-album singles	Self-released

=== Remixes ===
Title	Year	Artist	Label
Way Back Home	2016	Mako	Ultra
I'll Be Your Reason	2016	Illenium	Seeking Blue
Kerosene	2017	Armors	Good Night Bad Time
Let Go Of The Wheel	2017	Mako	Ultra
Lost	2018	Illenium	Seeking Blue
Alarm	2018	Lookas and Krewella	Monstercat
Forever (featuring Elohim)	2018	Ekali and Medasin	Self-Released
As We Fall	2019	League of Legends	Self-Released
As We Fall (Instrumental)	2019	League of Legends	Self-Released
Takeaway (featuring Lennon Stella)	2019	The Chainsmokers and Illenium	Self-Released
You	2021	Benny Blanco, Marshmello and Vance Joy	Self-Released
The Death of Peace of Mind	2024	Bad Omens	Sumerian
