= Badvoid =

British electronic dance music producer and DJ

BADVOID
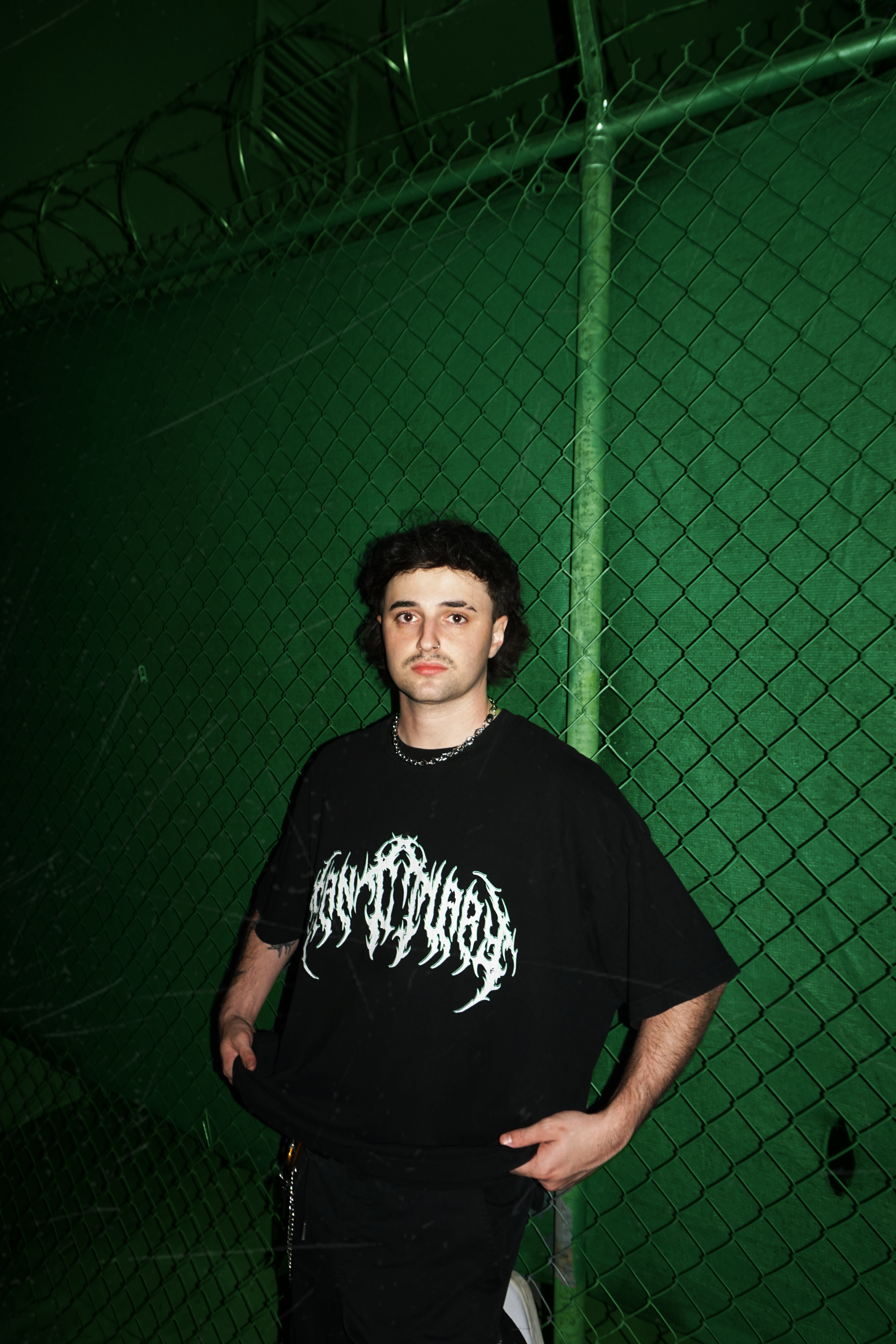
- BADVOID in 2024

Background information
- Also known as: Notorious CHRIS
- Born: Christopher Adams; 4 December 2000 (age 25); Newcastle upon Tyne, England
- Origin: Brisbane, Queensland, Australia
- Genres: Drum and bass; Dubstep; Bass music; Electronic rock
- Occupations: DJ; producer; musician; remixer
- Instrument: Digital audio workstation
- Years active: 2017
- Labels: Dim Mak; Insomniac Records; Barong Family; Buygore; Welcome Records
- Spouse: Emily Mucha (VAMPA)
- Website: badvoid.com

Christopher Adams (born 4 December 2000), professionally known as BADVOID (formerly Notorious CHRIS), is a British electronic dance music producer and DJ. He is known for his unique sound, which blends elements of drum and bass, dubstep, and midtempo genres. BADVOID has released music through labels such as Dim Mak Records, Insomniac Records, Ministry of Sound Australia, and Welcome Records, and has performed at prominent music festivals including Escape Halloween, Groovin' the Moo, and The Grass Is Greener.

== Early life ==
Christopher Adams was born in Newcastle upon Tyne, England, and later moved to Mackay, Australia. He began producing music while in high school, citing influences from heavy metal and rock music. Adams dropped out of school at age 16 due to bullying and death threats. In 2024 BADVOID relocated from Australia to Los Angeles, California.

== Career ==
=== 2017–2020: Beginnings and Early releases ===
Adams launched his career under the alias Notorious CHRIS and later transitioned to the name BADVOID. His early works included remixes and singles such as "Activate" (2019) and his debut EP, Enter the Void (2021), released under Buygore. The EP peaked at #3 on the Beatport Electro Charts and received airplay on Triple J and BBC Radio 1.

BADVOID has frequently collaborated with artists and labels, releasing tracks like "Asylum", "I Would Never" on Barong Family and "Anarchy" with Nikademis on Enforce Records.

=== 2021–Present: Rise to Prominence ===
In 2021, BADVOID joined The Recording Academy's voting membership. He continued to release singles and remixes, including "Poison" and "The Edge," on Kayzo's Welcome Records.

In 2023, BADVOID debuted on Sounds of Mayhem with his Mutiny EP, featuring tracks such as "Keep It Hardcore" and "Caution." That same year, he performed at music festivals such as Escape Halloween in San Bernardino, California and Academy LA.

== Discography ==
=== Extended Plays ===
Title	Released	Record label	Additional information
"Enter The Void"	2021	Buygore	
"MUTINY"	2023	Sounds Of Mayhem	

=== Singles ===
Title	Released	Record label	Additional information
"Activate"	2019	Ministry of Sound Australia	With HUZU
"Desolate"	2020	Self Release	
"I Would Never"	2020	Barong Family	With Jerry Jay
"Anarchy"	2020	Enforce Records	With Nikademis
"Sing Me To Sleep"	2021	Enforce Records	
"Ultra"	2021	Buygore	
"Trust"	2021	Buygore	With HUZU
"Get Out"	2021	Buygore	With WHZLY
"Asylum"	2021	Self Release	With Zabo
"Poison"	2022	Welcome Records	With OLSO
"Ghosted"	2022	Self Release	With Wisner
"Catastrophe"	2022	Self Release	With Neverwaves
"The Edge"	2022	Welcome Records	With Josh Rubin
"Open Your Eyes"	2023	Dim Mak Records	With Party Thieves
"Need Somebody"	2023	Insomniac (promoter)	With Doctor Werewolf
"Hellraiser"	2024	Create Music Group	
"Antagonist"	2025	Create Music Group	With Josh Rubin
"Breakthru"	2025	Create Music Group	With Guerro

=== Flips ===
Title	Released
"Nero - Satisfy"	2019
"Illenium - Paper Thin"	2019
"Lucille Croft - Control"	2019
"Bring Me The Horizon - Shadow Moses"	2019
"Whipped Cream - Blood"	2019

=== Remixes ===
Title	Released	Record label	Additional information
"We Are Fury - Remember"	2021	Create Music Group	
"Bijou - Rockstar"	2021	DND Recs	
"REAPER - Runaway"	2022	Insomniac Records	
"Kayzo - War"	2023	Welcome Records	
"JEANIE - Kiss Of Death"	2024	Create Music Group	
