= Hourglass (Mako album) =

Album by Mako

Studio album by Mako
- Released: 9 December 2016
- Recorded: 2013–16
- Genre: Dance-pop; progressive house; electronic rock; future bass
- Label: Ultra Records
- Producer: Alex Seaver; Logan Light; Morgan Page

Singles from Hourglass
- 1. "Smoke Filled Room" Released: 14 August 2015; 2. "Way Back Home" Released: 18 December 2015; 3. "Into the Sunset" Released: 22 April 2016; 4. "Wish You Back" Released: 9 December 2016

Hourglass is the debut studio album by American DJs Mako. It was released on 9 December 2016 via Ultra Records. A remix album would be released on April 28, 2017, via Ultra Records.

== Background ==
Several songs from the album were recorded few years ago including "I Wish You Back", "Let Go Of The Wheel" and "Our Story" which was re-created to be added to the album. Seaver said 2015 was the year it became apparent that they were making an album.

=== Title ===
The album title was named because Seaver felt that an hourglass represents time in a creative way. The time he spent in working on the album was also a reason of the name.

== Singles ==
"Smoke Filled Room" was released as the first single on 14 August 2015. Its accompanying music video was released

"Way Back Home" was released as the second single on 18 December 2015.

"Into the Sunset" was released as the third single on 22 April 2016.

"Wish You Back" featuring American singer Kwesi was released as the fifth single on 9 December 2016, together with the album.

=== Promotional singles ===
The Him's remix of "Wish You Back" was released as the first promotional single on 3 November 2016.

"Let Go of the Wheel" was released as the second promotional single on 19 November 2016. Alex Seaver of Mako commented on Facebook that it took them a whole year to finish the track, as well as it also being one of his favorite songs they have ever made.

== Track listing ==
=== Hourglass ===
No.	Title	Writer(s)	Length
1.	"Let Go of the Wheel"	Alex Seaver; Logan Light	4:00
2.	"Real Life" (with Morgan Page)	Alex Seaver; Logan Light; Morgan Page	2:56
3.	"Smoke Filled Room"	Alex Seaver; Logan Light	3:14
4.	"Wish You Back" (featuring Kwesi)	Alex Seaver; Logan Light; Kwesi	3:03
5.	"Into the Sunset"		3:27
6.	"Run for Your Life" (with Rat City featuring Natalola)		3:20
7.	"Paradise Lost"		3:30
8.	"Craziest Day I Ever Had"		3:22
9.	"North Dakota"		3:10
10.	"Devil May Cry"		3:13
11.	"Way Back Home"		4:39
12.	"Our Story" (Hourglass Finale)		4:54
13.	"Wish You Back (The Him Radio Edit)" (featuring Kwesi)		3:19
Total length:			46:07

=== Hourglass (The Remixes) ===
No.	Title	Length
1.	"Run for Your Life" (with Rat City featuring Natalola) (Attom Remix)	3:45
2.	"Let Go of the Wheel" (We Are Fury Remix)	4:13
3.	"Real Life" (with Morgan Page) (Ossian Remix)	3:56
4.	"Craziest Day I Ever Had" (MAGNÜS & Sean Myers Remix)	4:00
5.	"Wish You Back" (featuring Kwesi) (NOTD Remix)	2:44
6.	"North Dakota" (Le P Remix)	3:18
7.	"Let Go of the Wheel" (Culture Code Remix)	3:14
8.	"Real Life" (with Morgan Page) (Matt Baer Remix)	4:28
9.	"Run for Your Life" (with Rat City featuring Natalola) (SHADES Remix)	3:17
10.	"Paradise Lost" (Halcyon Remix)	3:41
11.	"Let Go of the Wheel" (Severo Remix)	3:16
12.	"Devil May Cry" (Konstantin Remix)	3:17
13.	"Wish You Back" (featuring Kwesi) (Sunset Child Remix)	3:32
14.	"Run for Your Life" (with Rat City featuring Natalola) (Attom Chill Remix)	3:24
Total length:		50:05

== Charts ==
Chart	Peak positions
US Top Dance/Electronic Albums	5
