= Lose You Now =

Single by Lindsey Stirling and Mako

from the EP Lose You Now
- Released: 15 January 2021
- Genre: Future bass; classical crossover; electropop; dance-pop; EDM
- Length: 3:13
- Label: Lindseystomp Records, BMG Rights Management (US) LLC
- Songwriters: Lindsey Stirling; Mako
- Producer: Jason Evigan

Lindsey Stirling singles chronology
"What You're Made Of" (2020)	"Lose You Now" (2021)	"Joy to the World" (2022)

"Lose You Now" is a 2021 single by American violinist Lindsey Stirling and American DJ and producer Mako. It reached number 3 on the Billboard Dance/Electronic Digital Song Sales chart. The single featured as a song on Stirling's 2021 EP of the same name, Lose You Now.

== Composition ==
The original basis for the song is Guardian written by Stirling, Taylor Bird and Peter Hanna for her 2019 album Artemis. The song is widely recognised as a tribute to Stirling's late father, and her friend and former bandmate Jason Gaviati who died in 2015.

Mako had met Stirling whilst she was working on the single "Love Goes On and On" with Amy Lee of Evanescence. Stirling said that the first time she heard Mako's lyrics to her song, it reduced her to tears:

I am so grateful for Mako for the lyrics he wrote to 'Lose You Now' because he perfectly captured the feelings I’d never been able to put into words. I actually balled [sic] like a baby the first time I heard his version.

== Release ==
"Lose You Now" was released on January 15 with a music video on YouTube. It was accompanied by a press release and dedicated page on her website where the song can be streamed across multiple services.

== Album artwork ==
The album artwork is similar to a Polaroid photo with the inset image featuring photos of Stirling's father and her friend Gaviati.

== Music video ==
The music video premiered on January 15, and as of 1 March 2022 it had over 4.8 million views on YouTube. It was directed by Stirling and Stephen Mallett.

The video features Mako in an abandoned warehouse with just a Yamaha piano, with two large spotlights behind him playing and singing. Meanwhile the video cuts to Stirling, who is exploring an abandoned facility in a steampunk style outfit. She has a projector, and we see her re-watching videos from her childhood featuring her and her father. During this she is clutching a small fox toy.

She walks out of the room with the projector and realises she has dropped the toy fox. Two assailants attempt to steal the projector and we see flashbacks of the videos. The films are damaged and Stirling sits on the floor reviewing the broken film before standing and a ghost image appears behind her, with toys and memories of her childhood begin levitating - along with her.

Interlaced in these clips, we see Stirling separately playing violin and dancing.

During a later interview, Stirling outlined the meaning behind certain aspects of the video:

The video is full of special memories and signs that represent the people I’ve lost. I used to have cereal picnics with my dad. Whenever I see a monarch butterfly, I feel like my friend Gavi is checking in on me. The little fox stuffed animal represents my baby niece, who passed away this summer. These little Easter eggs and many more make this video so special to me.

== Charts ==
"Lose You Now" debuted at number 3 on the Billboard Dance/Electronic Digital Songs chart for the week ending January 30, 2021. In the same week, it reached number 23 on the Hot Dance/Electronic Songs chart.

Chart	Peak position
US Hot Dance/Electronic Songs (Billboard)	23

== Acoustic version ==
In April 2021, Stirling and Mako released an acoustic version of "Lose You Now" produced by Stephen Anderson. An additional music video was created for the song, featuring Stirling and Mako performing alongside each other accompanied by two backing violinists.
