= Lose You Now (EP) =

EP by Lindsey Stirling
- Released: 17 July 2021
- Recorded: 2021
- Genre: Dubstep; classical crossover; classical; electro house; trance
- Length: 16:53
- Label: BMG
- Producer: Jason Evigan; Taylor Bird; Peter Hanna; Gladius; SILAS

Lindsey Stirling chronology
Artemis (2019)	Lose You Now (2021)	Snow Waltz (2022)

Singles from Lose You Now
- 1. "What You're Made Of" Released: August 12, 2020; 2. "Lose You Now" Released: January 15, 2021

Lose You Now is a 2021 EP released by American violinist, Lindsey Stirling.

== Background ==
Lose You Now is Stirling's second EP, her first, "Lindsey Stomp", was released in 2010. The EP was produced as an exclusive for Record Store Day 2021, with 2000 copies pressed exclusively on single sided vinyl.

The record contains its titular track, "Lose You Now" released in 2021 with Mako, alongside a further four songs. It also included Stirling's 2020 single What You're Made Of produced for the video game, Azur Lane, with Kiesza featuring as a guest vocalist. The three remaining tracks were from Stirling's 2019 album, Artemis.

The cover art for the record continued Stirling's theme of manga art during the Artemis era. The B side of the record was etched with butterflies.

== Track listing ==
No.	Title	Writer(s)	Producer(s)	Length
1.	"Lose You Now" (featuring Mako)	Lindsey Stirling; Taylor Bird; Peter Hanna; Jason Evigan; Mako	Jason Evigan	3:13
2.	"Guardian"	Stirling; Bird; Hanna	Bird; Hanna	3:20
3.	"What You're Made Of" (featuring Kiesza)	Stirling; Wendy Wang; RuthAnne; Gladius	Gladius	3:27
4.	"Torch Bringer"	Stirling; Mark Maxwell	SILAS	3:55
5.	"Embers"	Stirling; Maxwell	SILAS	3:38
Total length:				16:53

== Music videos ==
List of music videos, showing year released and director
Title	Year	Director(s)	Notes
"Lose You Now"	2021	Lindsey Stirling, Stephen Mallett	An acoustic video was released separately.
