= Artemis (album) =

Studio album by Lindsey Stirling
- Released: September 6, 2019
- Genre: Classical crossover
- Length: 51:11
- Label: Lindseystomp; BMG
- Producer: Taylor Bird; Peter Hanna; SILAS; KillaGraham; Mako; Scott Bruzenak; Petey Martin

Lindsey Stirling chronology
Warmer in the Winter (2017)	Artemis (2019)	Lose You Now (2021)

Singles from Artemis
- 1. "Underground" Released: June 21, 2019; 2. "The Upside" Released: July 5, 2019; 3. "Artemis" Released: August 26, 2019

Artemis is the fifth studio album by American violinist, singer, and songwriter Lindsey Stirling, released on September 6, 2019.

== Singles ==
The first single, "Underground", was released on June 21, 2019. Its music video debuted the same day, and features cameo appearances by Sofie Dossi, BDASH, and Miranda Wilking.

On July 5, 2019, the second single, "The Upside" was released. The music video was premiered and posted to YouTube on September 11, 2019. The music video was produced by Julian Conner, Tom Teller, and Seth Jsephon, with Nico Aguiler as the director of photography, production designed by Christine Cangelosi, edited by Lindsey Stirling, colored by Bryan Smaller, and sound design was done by Gerry Vasquez.

On August 3, 2019, a version of "The Upside" featuring Elle King was released as the third single. The second version of the song not only adds King's vocals, but also makes changes in the rest of the song.

On August 26, 2019, the third single and title track, "Artemis", was premiered during a live virtual reality concert in the PC VR application Wave, which was also livestreamed and made viewable afterward on Lindsey Stirling's Facebook page and YouTube channel.

== Critical reception ==
Artemis received mostly positive reviews from critics and audiences alike. Max Russell of The Young Folks scored the album an 8 out of 10, highlighting how, "Stirling leads the album by connecting a chorus of beautiful art held together by a bow in one hand and strings in the other." Users on Album of the Year, a music aggregate review site, scored it a 70 out of 100 based on 62 ratings.

Professional ratings
Review scores
Source	Rating
AllMusic	4/5 stars
The Edge	4/5 stars
The Young Folks	4/5 stars
Album of the Year	3.5/5 stars

== Track listing ==
No.	Title	Writer(s)	Producer(s)	Length
1.	"Underground"	Lindsey Stirling; Taylor Bird; Peter Hanna	Bird; Hanna	4:24
2.	"Artemis"	Stirling; Mark Maxwell	SILAS	3:53
3.	"Til the Light Goes Out"	Stirling; Graham Andrew Muron	KillaGraham	4:46
4.	"Between Twilight"	Stirling; Maxwell	SILAS	4:19
5.	"Foreverglow"	Stirling; Maxwell; AFSHeeN	SILAS	3:58
6.	"Love Goes On and On" (featuring Amy Lee)	Stirling; Alexander Seaver; Amy Lee	Mako; Scott Bruzenak	4:06
7.	"Masquerade"	Stirling; Bird; Hanna	Bird; Hanna	3:21
8.	"Sleepwalking"	Stirling; Petey Martin; Meghan Kabir	Martin	3:47
9.	"Darkside"	Stirling; Martin	Martin	4:07
10.	"The Upside"	Stirling; Bird; Hanna; Maureen McDonald; Maize Jane Olinger^{[a]}	Bird	3:47
11.	"Guardian"	Stirling; Bird; Hanna	Bird; Hanna	3:20
12.	"Aurora"	Stirling; Martin	Martin	3:35
13.	"The Upside" (featuring Elle King)	Stirling; Bird; Hanna; McDonald; Olinger	Bird	3:48
Total length:				51:11

Target bonus tracks
No.	Title	Writer(s)	Producer(s)	Length
14.	"Embers"	Stirling; Maxwell	SILAS	3:38
15.	"Torch Bringer"	Stirling; Maxwell	SILAS	3:55
Total length:				58:44

- ^{^[a]}Mozella and Maize Jane Olinger are credited together under the pseudonym 'Mozella & Maize'.

== Charts ==
=== Weekly charts ===
Chart (2019)	Peak position
Australian Albums (ARIA)	74
Austrian Albums (Ö3 Austria)	22
Belgian Albums (Ultratop Flanders)	187
Belgian Albums (Ultratop Wallonia)	36
Canadian Albums (Billboard)	76
French Albums (SNEP)	30
German Albums (Offizielle Top 100)	19
Polish Albums (ZPAV)	25
Scottish Albums (OCC)	43
Swiss Albums (Schweizer Hitparade)	13
UK Dance Albums (OCC)	3
US Billboard 200	22
US Independent Albums (Billboard)	1
US Top Classical Albums (Billboard)	1
US Top Dance Albums (Billboard)	1

=== Year end charts ===
Chart (2019)	Position
US Classical Albums (Billboard)	4

Chart (2020)	Position
US Classical Albums (Billboard)	6

Chart (2021)	Position
US Classical Albums (Billboard)	45

== Music videos ==
List of music videos, showing year released and director
Title	Year	Director(s)	Notes
"Underground"	2019	Tom Teller	Featuring Sofie Dossi, BDASH, and Miranda Wilking; Producer: Bryce Cyrier; Cinematographer: Nico Aguilar; Production Designer: Juan Ramal
"Artemis"	2019	Stephen Wayne Mallet; Lindsey Stirling	Dancers: Addison Byers, Kailyn Rogers, Jessica Richens, Taylor Gagliano; Producer: Hans Boysen, Green Glow Films; Cinematographer: Niels Lindelien
"The Upside" (vocal version)	2019	Tom Teller; Brodin Plett	Featuring Stirling as "Artemis", Travis Winfrey as "Calix", Kandee Johnson as "Nyx", Kit Thornberry & Drew Steen as "Shadow Guards", and vocalist Elle King; Producer: Seth Josephson, Frame 48; Cinematographer: Nico Aguilar; Production Designer: Christine Cangelosi
"Sleepwalking"	2020	Lindsey Stirling; Graham Fielder	Dancers: Addie Byers, Kat Cheng, Taylor Gagliano, Mikaela Jagim, Malece Miller, Sadie Posey, Jessica Richens, Kailyn Rogers; Producer: Lindsey Stirling and Jessica Breslow; VFX: Ethos.Studios; Colorist: RKM Studios
"Between Twilight"	2020	Stephen Wayne Mallet; Lindsey Stirling	Head of Production: Brooklynn Reeves Mallett; Producer: Hans Boysen; Cinematographer: Niels Lindelien; VFX: Daniel Craven; Colorist: Loren White; Rep for Stephen Mallett: Laure Scott
"Til the Light Goes Out"	2020	Stephen Wayne Mallet; Lindsey Stirling	Featuring: Addie Byers, Kailyn Rogers, Taylor Gagliano, Jessica Richens, Kandee Johnson; Head of Production: Brooklynn Reeves Mallett; Producer: Hans Boysen; Cinematographer: Niels Lindelien; Choreographer: Jillian Meyers; Stunt Coordinator: Nate Lee; VFX: Daniel Craven, Alex Bradley, Mitch Reaser, Steve Gallant; Colorist: Loren White; Rep for Stephen Mallett: Laure Scott
"Guardian"	2020	Lindsey Stirling	Cinematography: Rj Idos, Morgan Steinagel
"Lose You Now"	2021	Stephen Wayne Mallet; Lindsey Stirling	Adapted version of "Guardian" with lyrics and vocals by Mako; Head of Production: Brooklynn Reeves Mallett; Producer: Hans Boysen; 1st AD: Jeff Cobb; Cinematographer: Timothy S. Jensen; Steadicam: Niels Lindelien; Production Designer: Heather Drouillard; VFX: Daniel Craven & Alex Bradley; Colorist: Loren White
"Lose You Now (acoustic)"	2021	Stephen Wayne Mallet; Lindsey Stirling	Featuring lyricist/vocalist Mako; Head of Production: Brooklynn Reeves Mallett; Producer: Hans Boysen; 1st AD: Jeff Cobb; Cinematographer: Petros Antoniadis; Steadicam: Andres Raygoza; Colorist: Loren White
"Masquerade"	2021	Stephen Wayne Mallet; Lindsey Stirling	Featuring: Addie Byers, Kailyn Rogers, Taylor Gagliano, Jessica Richens; Head of Production: Brooklynn Reeves Mallett; Producer: Hans Boysen; 1st AD: Jeff Cobb; Cinematographer: Timothy S. Jensen; Steadicam: Merlin Showalter; Colorist: Loren White
"Love Goes On and On"	2022	Stephen Wayne Mallet; Lindsey Stirling	Featuring vocalist Amy Lee; Head of Production: Brooklynn Reeves Mallett; Producer: Hans Boysen; Production Company: Green Glow; Cinematographer: Brian Bradley; Colorist: Loren White
