= Underground (Lindsey Stirling song) =

Single by Lindsey Stirling

from the album Artemis
- Released: 21 June 2019
- Genre: Dubstep; classical crossover; electro house; EDM
- Length: 4:24
- Label: Lindseystomp Records
- Songwriter(s): Lindsey Stirling, Taylor Bird, Peter Hanna
- Producer(s): Taylor Bird, Peter Hanna

Lindsey Stirling singles chronology
"Carol of the Bells" (2018)	"Underground" (2019)	"The Upside" (2019)

"Underground" is a 2019 single released by violinist Lindsey Stirling.

== Background ==
Underground was the first single released from Stirling's new album, Artemis. Stirling had produced a small violin solo for her freestyle dance during her appearance on Dancing with the Stars, and in an interview in 2019 confirmed this was the original inspiration for the longer song.

Stirling stated that she was inspired by the Greek goddess Artemis, and drew parallels to her own challenges.

The single artwork was the first time fans saw the Stirling as a Manga character for her then-upcoming comic book series that was launched alongside the album.

== Music video ==
Released on the same day as the single, the music video for Underground was filmed in Los Angeles. The video features Stirling in a dystopian underworld, bound and trapped. Later in the video, which shows a future world city, Stirling appears as the Greek goddess Artemis in the clouds. In the first 6 hours, the video was viewed 300,000 times.

When interviewed about the video, Stirling explained the various shapes seen and their meanings:

"The three shapes represent the three prisoners underground: The dancing contortionist (circle), the dancing violinist (triangle), and the dancers stuck in the cell (square). I also the love symbolism of these shapes in general. Circles exemplify totality, wholeness, and perfection. Triangles represent strength because any weight placed on them is evenly distributed between all three sides. And the square represents commitment, balance, integrity, and direction."

== Charts ==
"Underground" spent two weeks on the Billboard Dance/Electronic Digital Song Sales chart, peaking at number 6.

Chart	Peak position
US Dance/Electronic Digital Song Sales (Billboard)	6
