= The Upside (song) =

2019 single by Lindsey Stirling

Single by Lindsey Stirling

from the album Artemis
- Released: 9 July 2019 (instrumental); 2 August 2019 (feat. Elle King)
- Genre: Dubstep; classical crossover; electro house; EDM
- Length: 3:37 (instrumental); 3:39 (feat. Elle King)
- Label: BMG
- Songwriters: Lindsey Stirling; Peter Hanna; Taylor Bird; Mozella; Maize Jane Olinger
- Producer: Taylor Bird

Lindsey Stirling singles chronology
"Underground" (2019)	"The Upside" (2019)	"Artemis" (2019)

Single cover with Elle King vocals

"The Upside" is a single written and recorded by violinist Lindsey Stirling. It was released as both an instrumental track and later a collaboration featuring vocals from Elle King.

== Background ==
"The Upside" was the second and third single released from Stirling's fifth album, Artemis. In July 2019 it was originally released as an instrumental track purely focusing on Stirling. Stirling performed the song on a number of occasions that summer, notably at PBS's A Capitol Fourth celebration.

This song provided inspiration for the name of Stirling's charity launched in 2020, The Upside Fund.

In August of the same year, "The Upside" was re-released with vocals by Elle King. Interviewed at the time, Stirling commented:

"Not only is Elle incredibly talented but I love who she is as a person. She is full of energy, self-love and positive vibes and I think you can hear it in her voice. She was the perfect person to give a special touch to this song and I couldn't be more excited!"

== Music video ==
On September 11, 2019, Stirling released the music video for "The Upside" featuring Elle King, directed by Tom Teller and Brodin Plett. The cinematic features Stirling as Artemis, leading an expedition from the underworld to the surface but things quickly unfold into a dystopian nightmare causing Artemis to run for her life. Amongst the story, visuals of King on vocals and Stirling on violin are shown.

== Charts ==
"The Upside" peaked at number 13 on the US Dance/Electronic Digital Song Sales chart.

Chart	Peak position
US Dance/Electronic Digital Songs (Billboard)	13
