= Snow Waltz =

2022 studio album by Lindsey Stirling

Studio album by Lindsey Stirling
- Released: October 7, 2022
- Recorded: Los Angeles, US
- Length: 45:00
- Label: Concord
- Producer: Gladius; Silas; Dehiro; Mark Ballas; Dave Lichens; Connor McDonough; Tiggs; John Mark Nelson; Giulio Cercato

Lindsey Stirling chronology
Lose You Now (2021)	Snow Waltz (2022)	Duality (2024)

Singles from Snow Waltz
- 1. "Ice Storm" Released: August 25, 2022; 2. "Joy To the World (Sped Up)" Released: December 16, 2022

Snow Waltz is the sixth studio album and second Christmas album by American violinist Lindsey Stirling, released on October 7, 2022, by Concord Records. The album was recorded in Los Angeles and produced by Gladius, and contains a mix of covers of Christmas standards and original tracks.

The first single, Ice Storm, was released via YouTube on August 25, 2022. On October 7, the video for "Snow Waltz", featuring a Halloween theme, was released alongside the album. Stirling made an appearance on The Kelly Clarkson Show on November 7 to perform "Joy to the World".

A tour was announced for November and December 2022 to promote the album. The tour extended into the UK.

== Track listing ==
Standard edition
No.	Title	Writer(s)	Producer(s)	Length
1.	"Sleigh Ride"	Leroy Anderson; Mitchell Parish	Gladius	3:02
2.	"God Rest Ye Merry Gentlemen"	Traditional	Mark Maxwell	3:16
3.	"Crazy for Christmas" (featuring Bonnie McKee)	Lindsey Stirling; Bonnie McKee; David Mørup; Mette Kathrine Mortensen	Dehiro	3:44
4.	"Feliz Navidad"	José Feliciano	Mark Ballas; Dave Lichens	3:22
5.	"Joy to the World (Intro)"	Traditional	Gladius	0:21
6.	"Joy to the World"	Traditional	Gladius	3:06
7.	"Snow Waltz"	Stirling; Connor McDonough; Riley McDonough	Connor McDonough	3:08
8.	"Christmas Time with You" (featuring Frawley)	Stirling; Lauren Frawley; Nathan Fertig; Jason Reeves; Dave Barnes	Tiggs	3:20
9.	"Little Drummer Boy"	Traditional	Gladius; John Mark Nelson	3:52
10.	"O Come, O Come Emmanuel"	Traditional	Maxwell	3:31
11.	"O Holy Night"	Traditional	Gladius	4:16
12.	"Magic" (featuring David Archuleta)	Stirling; Gladius	Gladius	3:29
13.	"Deck the Halls"	Traditional	Gladius	3:26
14.	"Ice Storm"	Stirling; Giulio Cercato	Cercato	3:07
Total length:				45:00

Target deluxe edition
No.	Title	Length
15.	"Manger / Noel (Medley)"	4:16
16.	"Dreidel (Medley)"	3:33

2023 Target deluxe edition
No.	Title	Length
17.	"Yuletide Regale"	3:11
18.	"We Wish You a Merry Christmas"	3:25

2024 deluxe edition
No.	Title	Length
15.	"You're a Mean One, Mr. Grinch (featuring Sabrina Carpenter)"	2:48
16.	"Manger / Noel (Medley)"	4:16
17.	"Yuletide Regale"	3:11
18.	"We Wish You a Merry Christmas"	3:25

Notes

- Physical copies of the album combine "Joy to the World" and its intro into one track.

== Music videos ==
List of music videos, showing year released and director
Title	Year	Director(s)
"Ice Storm"	2022	Stefano Bertelli
"Snow Waltz"	2022	Lindsey Stirling
"Joy to the World"	2022	Lindsey Stirling
"O Holy Night"	2022	Angel Studios
"Magic"	2022	Mark Eshleman
"Sleigh Ride"	2023	Stephen Mallett

== Charts ==
=== Weekly charts ===
Weekly chart performance for Snow Waltz
Chart (2022)	Peak position
German Albums (Offizielle Top 100)	88
Scottish Albums (OCC)	75
Swiss Albums (Schweizer Hitparade)	90
UK Album Downloads (OCC)	83
US Billboard 200	197
US Top Classical Albums (Billboard)	1
US Top Holiday Albums (Billboard)	2

=== Year end charts ===
Chart (2022)	Position
US Classical Albums (Billboard)	41

Chart (2023)	Position
US Classical Albums (Billboard)	8
