= Duality (Lindsey Stirling album) =

Studio album by Lindsey Stirling
- Released: June 14, 2024
- Recorded: Luna (Los Angeles); Smith Street (Lincoln)
- Genres: EDM; classical crossover
- Length: 43:13
- Labels: Concord; Lindseystomp
- Producers: Taylor Bird; Giulio Cercato; Geoffro; KillaGraham; Mako; Lindsey Stirling; Lucky West

Lindsey Stirling chronology
| Snow Waltz (2022) | Duality (2024) |

Singles from Duality
- 1. "Eye of the Untold Her" Released: March 8, 2024; 2. "Inner Gold" Released: April 12, 2024; 3. "Evil Twin" Released: May 17, 2024; 4. "Survive" Released: June 14, 2024

Duality is the seventh studio album by American violinist Lindsey Stirling, released on June 14, 2024, by Concord Records.

The first single, "Eye of the Untold Her", was released via YouTube on March 8, 2024. Three more singles followed leading up to the album's release: "Inner Gold" featuring Royal & the Serpent, "Evil Twin", and "Survive" featuring Walk off the Earth (which interpolates the Gloria Gaynor hit "I Will Survive").

Stirling toured the United States and Europe from July to November 2024 to promote the album, supported in the United States by Walk off the Earth, Saint Motel, and Audriix on different legs, and in Europe by Nya.

== Track listing ==
Standard edition track listing
| No. | Title | Writer(s) | Producer(s) | Length |
|---|---|---|---|---|
| 1. | "Evil Twin" | Lindsey Stirling; Graham Muron | KillaGraham | 3:47 |
| 2. | "Eye of the Untold Her" | Stirling; Alexander Seaver; Steve Mazzaro | Mako; Kris Eriksson^{[a]} | 3:40 |
| 3. | "Surrender" | Stirling; Giulio Cercato | Cercato | 3:22 |
| 4. | "Serenity Found" | Stirling; Muron | KillaGraham | 4:23 |
| 5. | "Untamed" | Stirling; Muron | KillaGraham | 3:07 |
| 6. | "Purpose" | Stirling; Muron | KillaGraham | 3:46 |
| 7. | "The Scarlet Queen" | Stirling; Lachlan West; Jörgen Elofsson | Lucky West; Elofsson | 3:17 |
| 8. | "Inner Gold" (featuring Royal & the Serpent) | Stirling; Geoffrey P. Earley; Maize Olinger | Geoffro; Kyle Buckley^{[v]} | 3:56 |
| 9. | "Survive" (featuring Walk off the Earth) | Stirling; West; Nick Furlong; Valerie Broussard; Dino Fekaris; Fredrick J. Perren | West | 3:17 |
| 10. | "Kintsugi" | Stirling; Taylor Bird; Peter Hanna | Bird | 3:41 |
| 11. | "Firefly Alley" | Stirling; West | West | 3:20 |
| 12. | "Les Fées" | Stirling; West | West | 3:38 |
| Total length: | | | | 43:13 |

Target bonus tracks
| No. | Title | Writer(s) | Producer(s) | Length |
|---|---|---|---|---|
| 13. | "Dream Weaver" | Stirling; Muron | KillaGraham | 4:10 |
| 14. | "Unfolding" (featuring Rachel Platten) | Stirling; Michel Lindgren Schulz; Melanie Fontana; Lauren Frawley | Lindgren; Jacob Munk^{[v]} | 3:39 |
| Total length: | | | | 51:02 |

Deluxe edition bonus tracks
| No. | Title | Writer(s) | Producer(s) | Length |
|---|---|---|---|---|
| 13. | "Monday Not Sick Anymore" | | Jason Richardson | 3:44 |
| 14. | "Eye of the Untold Her (Echo in the Dark)" (featuring Chrissy Costanza) | Stirling; Alexander Seaver; Steve Mazzaro | Mako; Kris Eriksson | 3:38 |
| 15. | "Evil Twin (remix)" (featuring Shuba) | Stirling; Graham Muron; Shuba | KillaGraham | 3:47 |
| 16. | "Unfolding" (featuring Rachel Platten) | Stirling; Michel Lindgren Schulz; Melanie Fontana; Lauren Frawley | Lindgren; Jacob Munk^{[v]} | 3:38 |
| 17. | "Dream Weaver" | Stirling; Muron | KillaGraham | 4:09 |
| Total length: | | | | 62:09 |

Note

- ^{^[a]} signifies an additional producer
- ^{^[v]} signifies a vocal producer
- "Survive" contains interpolations from "I Will Survive", written by Freddie Perren and Dino Fekaris, and performed by Gloria Gaynor.

== Personnel ==
- Lindsey Stirling – violins, violin engineering, vocals, executive production
- Ryan Nasci – mixing
- Joe Lambert – mastering
- Drew Steen – additional engineering (5–7), drums ("Monday Not Sick Anymore")
- Ryan Riveros – additional engineering (5–7)
- KillaGraham – guitars (1, 4–6, "Dream Weaver"), programming (1, 4–6); cello, bass, drums, piano, synthesizer, flute, percussion ("Dream Weaver")
- Alexander Seaver – keyboard, piano (2)
- Giulio Cercato – guitar, bass, keyboards, programming (3)
- Jörgen Elofsson – keyboards, programming (7)
- Royal & the Serpent – vocals (8)
- Geoffro – piano, guitars, bass, drum programming (8)
- Lucky West – drums, bass, guitars, keyboards, programming (9, 11, 12)
- Walk off the Earth – vocals (9)
- Rachel Platten – vocals ("Unfolding")
- Lindgren – drum programming, bass, keyboards, guitars ("Unfolding")
- Jason Richardson - guitars ("Monday Not Sick Anymore")
- Chrissy Costanza - vocals ("Eye of the Untold Her (Echo in the Dark)")
- Shuba - vocals ("Evil Twin (remix)")
- Ashley Osborn – photography
- P. R. Brown – artwork

== Charts ==
Chart performance for Duality
| Chart (2024) | Peak position |
|---|---|
| Australian Vinyl Albums (ARIA) | 12 |
| Belgian Albums (Ultratop Flanders) | 129 |
| Belgian Albums (Ultratop Wallonia) | 25 |
| German Albums (Offizielle Top 100) | 15 |
| Scottish Albums (Official Charts) | 38 |
| Swiss Albums (Schweizer Hitparade) | 28 |
| UK Album Downloads (Official Charts) | 22 |
| UK Albums Sales (OCC) | 25 |
| US Billboard 200 | 84 |
| US Independent Albums (Billboard) | 15 |
| US Top Classical Albums (Billboard) | 1 |

== Music videos ==
List of music videos, showing year released and director
| Title | Year | Director(s) | Notes |
|---|---|---|---|
| "Eye of the Untold Her" | 2024 | Stephen Wayne Mallet; Lindsey Stirling | Featuring Derek Hough and Mark Ballas |
| "Inner Gold" | 2024 | Stephen Wayne Mallet; Lindsey Stirling | Featuring Royal & the Serpent; Dancers: Taylor Gagliano, Annelise Ritacca, Selena Hamilton, Madeline Underwood, Shelby Steele, Anika Kojima, Kailyn Rogers; Choreography: Ashley Gonzales |
| "Evil Twin" | 2024 | Lindsey Stirling; Osama Yassif | Filmed in Giza |
| "Survive" | 2024 | Stephen Wayne Mallet; Lindsey Stirling | Featuring Sarah Blackwood of Walk off the Earth; Dancers: Taylor Gagliano, Annelise Ritacca, Selena Hamilton, Jalen Forward, Andrew Mulet; Choreography: Ashley Gonzales |
| "Unfolding" | 2025 | Stephen Wayne Mallet; Lindsey Stirling | Featuring Rachel Platten |
| "Evil Twin" (remix feat. Shuba) | 2025 | Stephen Wayne Mallet; Lindsey Stirling; Osama Yassif | Lyrical remix of the song Featuring vocalist Shuba |
| "Monday Not Sick Anymore" | 2025 | Lindsey Stirling; Jordan Lister | Filmed at the Santa Monica Pier; Featuring dancers Taylor Gagliano, Anika Kojima, Annelise Ritacca, and Kailyn Rogers, and musicians Michel'le Baptiste and Destiny Petrel |
| "Eye of the Untold Her (Echo in the Dark)" | 2026 | Lindsey Stirling | Lyrical remix of the song Featuring vocalist Chrissy Costanza |
| "Surrender" | 2026 | Lindsey Stirling | DP: Ruben Plascencia |
| "Serenity Found" | 2026 | Lindsey Stirling | DP: Ruben Plascencia |
| "Untamed" | 2026 | Stephen Wayne Mallett; Lindsey Stirling | Featuring guitarist Ryan Riveros and drummer Eric Kalver |
| "Purpose" | 2026 | Stephen Wayne Mallett; Lindsey Stirling | CGI animation by Stephen Mallett |
