= Artemis (song) =

Single by Lindsey Stirling

from the album Artemis
- Released: 26 August 2019
- Genre: Dubstep; classical crossover; electro house; EDM
- Length: 3:54
- Label: Lindseystomp Records
- Songwriter(s): Lindsey Stirling, SILAS
- Producer(s): Lindsey Stirling

Lindsey Stirling singles chronology
"The Upside" (2019)	"Artemis" (2019)	"What You're Made Of" (2020)

"Artemis" is a 2019 single by violinist Lindsey Stirling.

== Background ==
"Artemis" was the fourth single released from Stirling's album same name. The song was written, produced and performed by Stirling and is an instrumental track.

The track was released prior to the full album, and the launch event showed Stirling as a virtual reality avatar performing the song via Wave.

In March 2020, NASA launched a video created with Stirling promoting their 2024 Artemis Space Program. Stirling performed her song in an emotive video in the shadow of the Vehicle Assembly Building at Kennedy Space Center in Florida.

== Music video ==
On August 30, 2019, Stirling released her music video for Artemis. It was produced by Stirling and Stephen Mallett. Continuing the theme of the album, Stirling returns to the role of the Greek goddess Artemis exploring her surroundings in a vast forest. The dancers move like hunters, matching Artemis's title as the goddess of wild animals, the hunt and vegetation.

Alongside the official music video, Stirling launched a behind-the-scenes video on September 5, 2019.

== Charts ==
"Artemis" peaked at number 9 on the Billboard Dance/Electronic Digital Song Sales chart for the week ending September 14, 2019.

Chart (2019)	Peak position
Dance/Electronic Digital Song Sales (Billboard)	9
