= Ekali (DJ) =

Musician, DJ, and music producer

- Born: Nathan Shaw; September 22, 1991 (age 35); Vancouver, Canada
- Genres: EDM, electronic music, trap, hip hop, bass, future bass
- Occupations: DJ; music producer; musician
- Years active: 2013–present
- Labels: Awakening Records; Big Beat; OWSLA; Atlantic

Nathan Shaw (born September 22, 1991), known professionally as Ekali, is a Canadian electronic music producer, DJ, and musician based in Vancouver, British Columbia. To date, he has released one studio album, A World Away (2020) via Big Beat Records and two EP's, Crystal Eyes (2018) via OWSLA and his most recent, Alinea on June 23, 2023, through his independent imprint, Awakening.

Over the course of his career, Shaw has collaborated the likes of ZHU, Denzel Curry, KRANE, ILLENIUM and performed at a series of high-profile music festivals, such as Coachella, The Grass Is Greener, and Shambala Festival.

== History ==
Originally hailing from Vancouver, British Columbia, Shaw's first experiences with music started from a young age, learning the violin and branching out to other contemporary musical instruments as he grew up. He would initially gain recognition in the music industry as the bassist for Vancouver-based indie rock band, Said the Whale which he joined in 2011. Concurrently in-between touring, Shaw also began to learn music production and started creating sample-based instrumentals, as he didn't feel confident enough to perform vocals on his own material. He quickly broke into the local underground music scene as a DJ and would become a member of Vancouver electronic music collective, Chapel Sound. On November 20, 2013, Shaw released his debut single, "Unfaith" via SoundCloud.

In 2014, Shaw attended the Red Bull Music Academy in Tokyo, Japan as the only Canadian participant of that year, to workshop and collaborate with musical peers and contemporaries from around the world. A collaboration during the program between Shaw, American Grammy Award-winning producer/songwriter Om'Mas Keith and RBMA alumni, Austrian producer Dorian Concept called "On Me" would be released January 13, 2015, via RBMA and highlighted as a single for their Various Assets – Not For Sale 2014 compilation.

The following month, Shaw quickly rose to prominence after Canadian rapper and singer, Drake sampled "Unfaith" for his surprise mixtape, If You're Reading This It's Too Late released February 13, 2015, via OVO and Young Money Entertainment on the songs, "Preach" and "Wednesday Night Interlude" both featuring Canadian R&B singer, PARTYNEXTDOOR respectively. Soon after, "Unfaith" was officially re-released to streaming platforms on March 31, 2015.

Following the mixtape's release, Shaw's profile was significantly raised internationally as a producer and DJ. In 2016, Shaw would officially leave Said the Whale to focus on touring his own music and producing full-time and relocated to Los Angeles soon after, to sign a recording contract with American producer, Skrillex's label, OWSLA in 2017. Shaw would go on to release several singles through the label, including "Babylon" featuring Florida-based rapper, Denzel Curry on August 18, 2017, alongside the announcement of his signing. Shaw's debut EP, Crystal Eyes was released on October 21, 2018, via OWSLA. preceded by lead single, "Leaving" featuring Malaysian singer, Yuna released August 24, 2018.

On January 24, 2020, Shaw released his debut studio album, A World Away via Big Beat Records, featuring guest appearances by Au/Ra, Elohim, Kiiara, ILLENIUM, Wafia, and Reo Cragun.

On June 23, 2023, Shaw released his second EP, Alinea via his independent record label, Awakening Records.

== Discography ==
=== Studio albums ===
- A World Away (2020)

=== Extended plays ===
- Crystal Eyes (2018)
- Alinea (2023)

=== Playlists ===
- Awakening - Mix 1 (2017)
- Awakening - Mix 2 (2017)
- Awakening - Mix 3 (2017)
- Awakening - Mix 4 (2018)
- Awakening - Mix 5 (2018)
- Awakening - Mix 6 (2018)
- Awakening - Mix 7 (2019)
- Awakening - Mix 8 (2020)
- Awakening - Mix 9 (2022)
- Awakening - Mix 10 (2023)
- Awakening - Mix 11 (2023)
- Awakening - Mix 12 (2023)

== Singles ==
Title	Year	Album
"Unfaith"	2013	Non-album singles
"I Won't Lie" with Falcons (feat. Vanessa Elisha)	2016	Non-album singles
"Akira" with KRANE	2017	Non-album singles
"Babylon" (featuring Denzel Curry)	2017	Non-album singles
"Past Life" (featuring Opia)	2017	Non-album singles
"Blame" (with ZHU)	2018	Non-album singles
"Blood Moon" (with TYNAN and Hekler)	2018	Non-album singles
"Helios" (with SLUMBERJACK)	2018	Crystal Eyes EP
"Leaving" (featuring Yuna)	2018	Crystal Eyes EP
"Forgot How To Dream" (featuring K.Flay)	2019	Crystal Eyes EP
"R U I N" (with 1788-L)	2019	Non-album singles
"Jundo" (with YOOKiE)	2019	Non-album singles
"Runaway" (with Reo Cragun)	2019	A World Away
"Be Fine" (featuring Wafia)	2019	A World Away
"Back to You" (featuring Kiiara)	2019	A World Away
"Hard To Say Goodbye" (with ILLENIUM featuring Chloe Angelides)	2020	A World Away
"Drown" (featuring Au/Ra)	2020	A World Away
"Remember Me (with RemK)"	2022	Non-album singles
"Purity"	2023	Alinea EP
"Kindred"	2023	Alinea EP
"Fool" (featuring Bloom)	2023	Alinea EP

== Remixes ==
Title	Year	Artist(s)
"Bloom" (Ekali Remix)	2014	Dpat
"Days In The West" (Drake cover) (Ekali Remix)	2014	Tinashe
"Sorry" (Ekali Remix)	2014	Ciara
"Orphan's Son" (Ekali Remix)	2014	Eli Muro
"Stupid" (Maximus MMC & Ekali Remix)	2014	Gucci Mane
"Good" (Ekali & Gravez Remix)	2014	Sonny Digital
"Needy" (Ekali Remix)	2014	Pat Lok
"Know Yourself" (Ekali Remix)	2014	Drake
"Prestige" (Ekali Remix)	2015	Tre Capital & Sean Leon
"Gemini (featuring George Maple) (Ekali Remix)	2015	What So Not
"Threatz" (Ekali & Gravez Remix)	2015	Denzel Curry
"Long Time No See" (featuring Atu) (Ekali Remix)	2015	Ta-ku
"Can I" (Ekali Remix)	2015	Alina Baraz & Galimatias
"Weight In Gold" (Ekali Remix)	2015	Gallant
"Smoke & Retribution" (featuring Vince Staples & Kučka) (Ekali Remix)	2016	Flume
"I Can't Stop" (Ekali Tribute)	2016	Flux Pavilion
"Mind" (featuring Kai) (Ekali & Gravez Remix)	2016	Jack Ü
"Meet In The Middle" (Ekali Remix)	2017	Ta-ku & Wafia
"Language" (Ekali & QUIX Tribute)	2017	Porter Robinson
"Don't Leave" (Ekali Remix)	2017	Snakehips & MØ
"Floating" (featuring Khalid) (Ekali Remix)	2017	Alina Baraz
"When I Look At You" (Ekali Tribute)	2022	Emalkay
