= Nikademis =

American electronic music producer and DJ

- Born: Nick Liuzzi
- Origin: Long Island, New York, U.S.
- Genres: Future bass, melodic bass
- Occupations: Producer, DJ, Songwriter
- Years active: 2014–present
- Labels: Lost in Dreams, Ophelia Records, Welcome Records
- Website: nikademis.com

Nikademis (born Nick Liuzzi) is an American electronic music producer, DJ, and songwriter. He first drew national attention for an official remix of Illenium’s “U & Me” (2021) and was named one of Dancing Astronaut’s “Artists to Watch” for 2023.

== Early life ==
Liuzzi grew up on Long Island. He began DJing school events in 2013 and taught himself digital production software the following year.

== Career ==
=== 2019–2021: Independent releases ===
A 2019 Trillvo feature profiled his track “The Simulation” and chronicled his shift from progressive house toward darker bass sounds. In February 2021 he issued “I Don’t Wanna Know” with Friendzone and Candace Sosa, followed in September by an official remix of Illenium and Sasha Alex Sloan’s “U & Me,” later included on Illenium’s album Fallen Embers (remix edition).

=== 2022–present: Industry recognition ===
Dancing Astronaut cited Liuzzi’s Illenium remix, several singles released through the label Lowly., and a Welcome Records collaboration with Poni when selecting him for its 25-artist 2023 watch list. His crossover single “Follow You Home,” created with Far Out and Sarah de Warren for Ophelia Records, was released in June 2023; Dancing Astronaut described it as “a melodic-bass standout that cements Nikademis’ upward trajectory.” A September 2023 EDMTunes interview documented his signing to Lost in Dreams and touring slots with Blanke and Slander.

In the lead-up to Electric Zoo 2023, Dancing Astronaut listed Nikademis among its “can’t-miss sets,” spotlighting his Saturday appearance on the festival’s bass-music stage.

A March 2024 Neon Owl feature conducted aboard the charter festival Groove Cruise explored his creative process and “dark, cinematic sound design.”

In July 2024 he co-produced “If Tomorrow Never Happens” with Slander and Poo Bear, covered by DJ Life Magazine as “an anthem poised for main-stage play.” EDM.com praised the track for “exploring the depths of a nonexistent future” while retaining a euphoric melodic-bass framework.

== Musical style ==
Interviewers describe Nikademis’ catalogue as “melodic yet mid‑tempo,” combining ambient pads with heavier distortion drops.

== Selected discography ==
=== Singles ===
Year	Title	Credited artist(s)	Role	Label	Ref.
2021	"U & Me" (Nikademis Remix)	Illenium & Sasha Alex Sloan	Remixer	Illenium	
2023	"Follow You Home" (feat. Sarah de Warren)	Far Out & Nikademis	Lead artist	Ophelia Records	
2024	"If Tomorrow Never Happens"	SLANDER, Poo Bear & Nikademis	Co-artist	Heaven Sent	
