= What You're Made Of (Lindsey Stirling song) =

Single by Lindsey Stirling featuring Kiesza

from the EP Lose You Now
- Released: 12 August 2020
- Genre: Dubstep; classical crossover; electro house; EDM
- Length: 3:27
- Label: Lindseystomp Records (BMG)
- Songwriters: Lindsey Stirling, Wendy Wang, RuthAnne, Gladius
- Producer: Gladius

Lindsey Stirling singles chronology
"Artemis" (2019)	"What You're Made Of" (2020)	"Lose You Now" (2021)

"What You're Made Of" is a 2020 single written and performed by violinist Lindsey Stirling featuring guest vocals from Kiesza.

== Background ==
"What You're Made Of" was written by Stirling, alongside RuthAnne, Wendy Wang and producer Gladius for the second anniversary for Global or English version of mobile video game Azur Lane.

Stirling wrote the song at an all female SheWrites writing camp. Speaking about the song in the official press release, she said:

"I’ve always loved anime art and I was ecstatic when I got to write a song for an anime game that revolved around female empowerment. It was also perfect because I wrote this song at an all-female writing camp. It’s about how even when you feel broken, you are so incredibly powerful. It’s in the moments of near defeat that you chart your truest fate because the way you react when you’re at the bottom really shows what you’re made of."

Kiesza was brought onto the project for guest lyrics. She would later join Stirling's Artemis World Tour as a guest performer.

== Music video ==
An official lyric video was released along with the song on August 13, 2020.
