= Escape Halloween =

Electronic dance music festival organized by Insomniac in Southern California

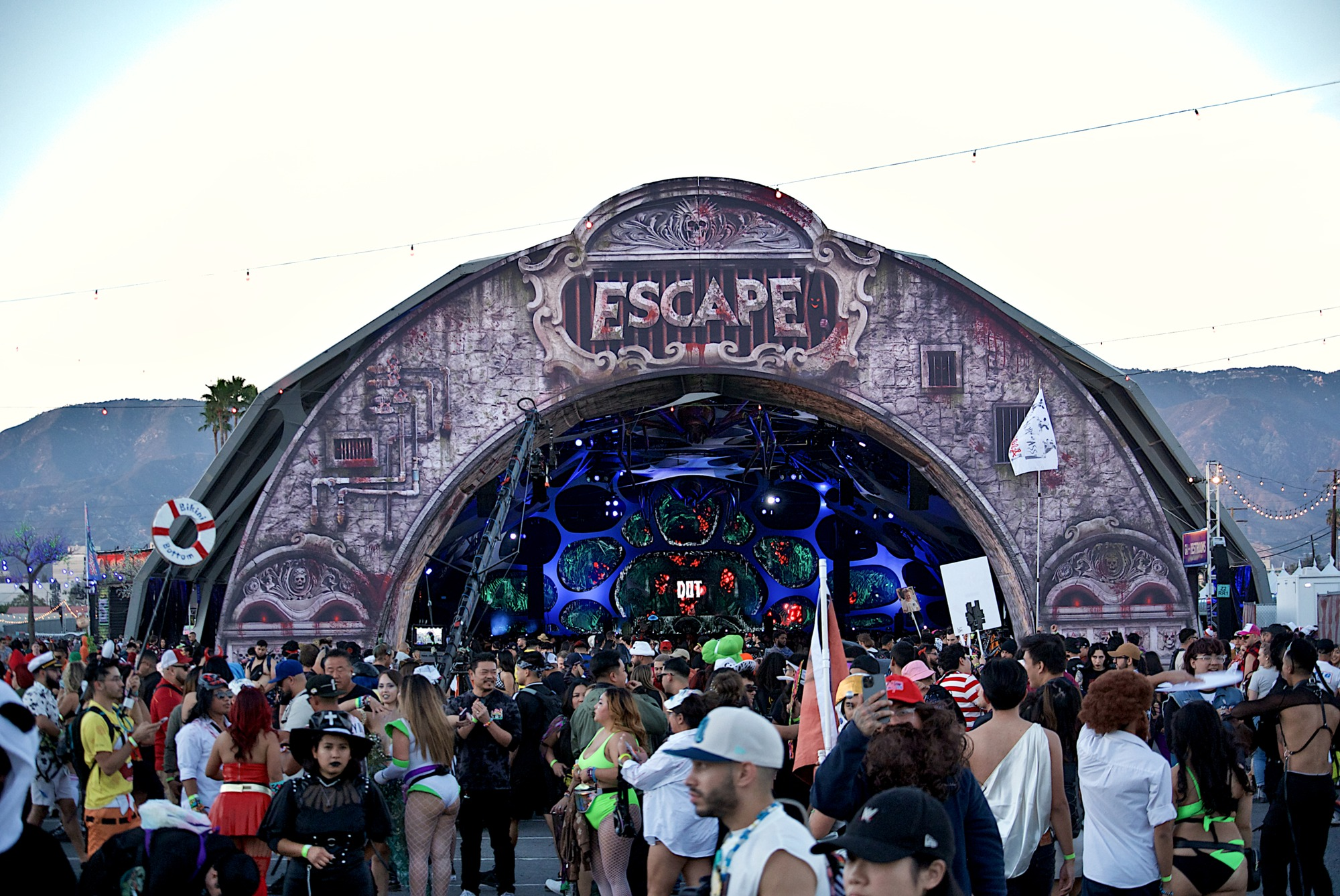
- Main stage archway at the 2022 edition
- Genre: EDM, house, techno, dubstep, hardstyle, trance, others
- Date: Weekend preceding Halloween annually
- Locations: National Orange Show Event Center, San Bernardino, California
- Years active: 2011–present
- Founders: Insomniac
- Next event: Escape Halloween 2024: October 25-26
- Website: escapehalloween.com

Escape Halloween is an electronic dance music festival organized by promoter and distributor Insomniac. The annual event, which debuted in 2011, is held at the National Orange Show Event Center in San Bernardino, California on the weekend preceding Halloween, and is centered around Halloween and traditional horror themes. There are themed stages, Halloween walk-through mazes, art galleries, and costumed performers. Music genres include EDM, house, dance, electro house, drum and bass, techno, dance-punk, hardstyle, dubstep, trance, and more.

The festival holds four main stage tents. Stages that have been hosted by the event include Insomniac's brands: Audiotistic, Basscon, Bassrush, and Factory 93. Stages have also been hosted by artists such as Richie Hawtin's ENTER., Jamie Jones presents Paradise, Laidback Luke's Super You & Me, and Nicole Moudaber's MOODzone.

== History ==
The first Escape Halloween festival debuted in 2011 under the name "Escape From Wonderland". It was held by Insomniac Events at the National Orange Show Event Center ("NOS Event Center") in San Bernardino, CA, and featured artists including Afrojack, Benny Benassi, Cedric Gervais, and Crizzly.

For Escape's second year in 2012, they kept the name "Escape from Wonderland" and returned to the NOS Event Center in Southern California.

The festival continued to keep the name "Escape From Wonderland" in 2013, and took place in the San Manuel Amphitheater in Southern California.

In 2014, the festival adopted the name "Escape: All Hallows Eve" and returned to the NOS Event Center in Southern California.

For 2015, the festival changed its name to "Escape: Psycho Circus." It was hosted again in the NOS Event Center in Southern California. The lineup included Adam Auburn, Eric Prydz, Joris Voorn, and Paul Van Dyk amongst many others.

In 2016, the festival kept the name "Escape: Psycho Circus" and again returned to the NOS Event Center, hosting Yellow Claw, The Chainsmokers, Hardwell, Armin van Buuren, and Kaskade among others. This was also the first year that Richie Hawtin's ENTER. did not host the Cannibals' Tea Party, techno stage.

In 2017, the festival continued to keep the name "Escape: Psycho Circus" and again took place at the NOS Event Center, featuring Tiesto, DJ Snake, NGHTMRE, Marshmello, and more. Audiotistic hosted a stage and Basscon brought hardstyle to the Halloween party. Bassrush hosted The Chopping Block for two nights, while Factory 93 hosted both nights at the Cannibals' Tea Party with Jamie Jones presenting Paradise on and Nicole Moudaber's MOODzone.

In 2024, the festival also included a stage by Boiler Room, with artists such as DeadMau5, Wooli, Illenium, Martin Garrix, and more.

== Charity ==
Since 2011, Insomniac has worked with charities in the San Bernardino area. They allocate $1 per ticket transaction and $10 per guest list attendee. Below are a few of the charities that Insomniac has worked with:

- Brent Shapiro Foundation: starting in 2005, Brent Shapiro Foundation works to bring awareness to alcohol and drug dependency.
- San Bernardino Sheriff’s PRCA Pro Rodeo: San Bernardino Sheriff’s PRCA Pro Rodeo, started in 1957, hosts a rodeo and hopes to foster a better relationship between law enforcement and the community.
- San Bernardino Symphony Orchestra Music in Education Program: founded in 1929, the San Bernardino Symphony gives access to symphonic music available to those in San Bernardino and Riverside counties.
- Second Harvest Food Bank: The Second Harvest Food Bank began in 1980 and distributes food to those in need.
