= Mako (DJ) =

American music producer, singer, songwriter, composer and DJ

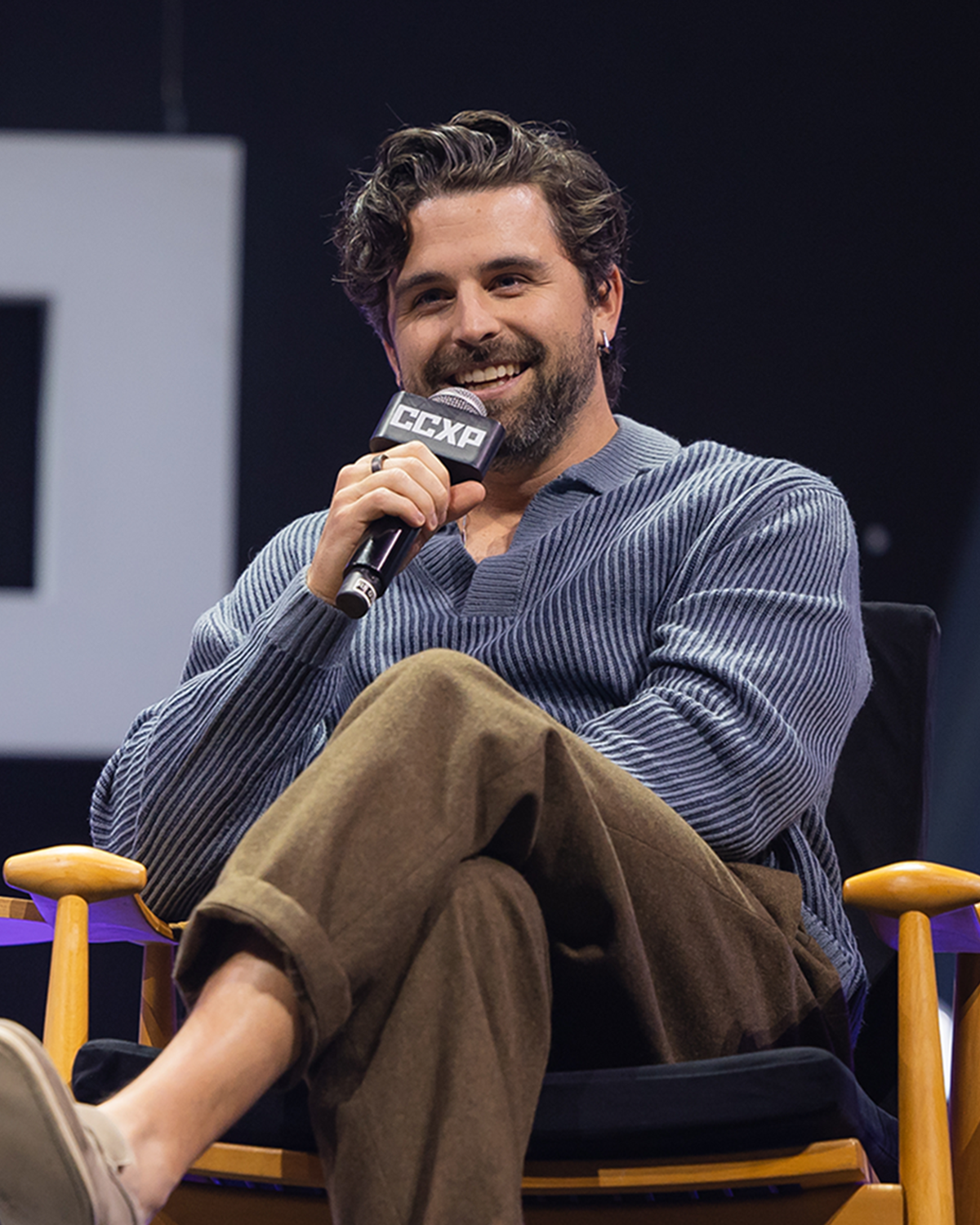
- Mako in 2024

Background information
- Genres: Electropop; indie pop; indie electronic; house; progressive house
- Occupations: DJ; Music Producer; Singer; Songwriter; Composer
- Years active: 2011–present
- Labels: Ultra; Spinnin'; DOORN; Revealed; Interscope
- Members: Alexander Seaver
- Past members: Logan Light
- Website: itsmako.com

Mako (Note: The name "Mako" is taken from "this magical source of light" in the Final Fantasy franchise, which is pronounced /meɪkoʊ/ MAY-koh. While Seaver personally pronounces it that way, people "generally don't guess" that pronunciation in favor of /mʌkoʊ/ ma-KOH or /mækoʊ/ MAK-oh, and ultimately feels that the pronunciation is "not a big deal".) is the solo project of Alexander Seaver, an American songwriter, music producer, composer, and DJ based in Los Angeles. Initially debuting as a duo with Logan Light, Mako rose to prominence in the electronic dance music scene with chart-topping tracks such as "Smoke Filled Room" from the debut studio album Hourglass (2017). Following Light’s departure in 2017, Seaver transitioned into composing and producing for Riot Games, contributing to the Emmy-winning animated series Arcane and several League of Legends World Championship anthems. His second studio album, Fable (2021), featured streaming hits such as "Breathe" and "Murder", further showcasing his unique fusion of classical training and contemporary production.

Seaver’s career highlights include writing and producing "Legends Never Die" (2017), the platinum-certified League of Legends World Championship anthem featuring Against the Current and Chrissy Costanza, as well as subsequent anthems like "Rise" with The Glitch Mob and The Word Alive from 2018 League of Legends World Championship, "Gods" (2023) featuring K-pop supergroup NewJeans, and "Sacrifice" (2025) featuring G.E.M..

In addition to his contributions to the League of Legends soundscape, Seaver played a pivotal role in the music team for Arcane, Netflix's record-breaking animated series inspired by the game's universe. The Arcane Season 1 soundtrack featured collaborations with artists such as Sting, Bea Miller, Woodkid, Imagine Dragons, Denzel Curry, and Pusha T, earning widespread acclaim and solidifying Seaver's reputation as a versatile composer and producer. The show received universal acclaim and earned Seaver his first primetime Emmy nomination.

For Arcane Season 2, Seaver expanded his role as executive music producer, curating a larger and more diverse soundtrack with contributions from artists such as Mike Shinoda of Linkin Park, Stromae, Twenty One Pilots, Marcus King, and Stray Kids, alongside his own featured track.

== Career ==
=== 2011: Formation of Mako ===
Before an introduction was made, the two artists spent their early life progressing musically in different worlds. Both members' fathers were paired as roommates at Syracuse University and they are good friends.

Logan Light, who was part of Mako, went to Columbia University in New York City before heading for the University of Michigan. He attended the university, majored in communications and graduated in 2011. While his parents were reluctant to accept his career choice (of DJing), they eventually lent Light some money so that he could buy DJ equipment such as turntables to play at parties. His career blew up when he started to book gigs and associate with world-known DJs like Above & Beyond and Zedd. Within only several years, Light had opened for some of dance music's biggest international acts, including Tiesto and Avicii.

Seaver attended the Juilliard School on full scholarship as musician. Having played with some of the world's elite classical artists in the most storied of venues, he knew he was destined for an unusual path. Upon graduating school in New York City, Seaver moved to Los Angeles after being selected for the ASCAP scholarship workshop for scoring music to film and television. He is also a singer-songwriter and regularly contributes vocals to Mako's songs.

Mako was formed after the 2011 Electric Daisy Carnival when Light invited to Seaver to "witness his world".

Light spoke of Seaver in an interview, saying "Thankfully, Alex has the brain of a musical genius. He hates when I say this, but he probably is the most talented musical person I've ever met. And none of what we do would be possible without him. I mean he's the brain of it all, and I'm lucky to be along for the ride. Musical composition is his world, and every once in a while I add my two cents and he says, 'Oh that's smart,' but that's his cup of tea, not mine."

Since their start, Mako has built a working relationship with Interscope Records, quickly finding themselves in studio with some of EDM's top artists such as Avicii, Sander van Doorn, R3hab, DubVision and many others. Mako's first label release, "Into the Light" featuring Sander van Doorn was released on Dutch label Spinnin' Records. It reached number 3 on the Beatport Top 100 chart in one week and remained in the top 5 for over two weeks.

=== 2013–2015: Debut single with Sander van Doorn ===
On May 13, 2013, Mako released their debut single with Sander van Doorn and DubVision titled "Into the Light" featuring Mariana Bell. An official music video was uploaded on Spinnin' Records' YouTube channel nine days later.

On December 16, 2013, they released "Beam" as a single which was mixed by Dannic. An official music video for the song was uploaded by Revealed Recordings' YouTube channel three days later.

On August 12, 2014, they released a single titled "Our Story" along with an official music video on YouTube uploaded by Ultra Records. A remixes EP of the song was also released.

On February 24, 2015, they released "I Won't Let You Walk Away" featuring Madison Beer. An official music video was uploaded on the same day.

On August 14, 2015, they released "Smoke Filled Room" as a single via Ultra Records. Later, they released a remixes' single of the song along with an acoustic version and two more remixes. An official music video of the song was uploaded by Ultra Records' YouTube channel five months later. An official music video for the acoustic version was also released by Ultra Records.

Mako featured in Steve Angello's song titled "Children of the Wild". A music video was uploaded on Steve Angello's YouTube channel.

=== 2016–2018: Hourglass and the departure of Light ===
On April 21, 2016, "Into The Sunset" was released as a single on YouTube. On October 25, 2016, Mako announced that their debut upcoming album, "Hourglass". On November 19, 2016, they released the single "Let Go Of The Wheel".

On December 9, 2016, they released their debut studio album, Hourglass via Ultra Records.

On March 6, 2017, Light shared a handwritten note that stated he would be taking a break from touring with Mako during 2017, leaving Seaver as a solo act (with a backing back) on their tour that year. Light began business school at The University of Chicago in the fall of 2018. At some point during the year after the announcement, Mako officially became a solo act, with Seaver releasing "Breathe" in December as a solo artist.

In an interview on January 26, 2018, Alex Seaver discussed the details of Logan Light leaving the group. "What actually happened was he was in law school for the last couple years, killed it, passed the bar, and then got a huge offer at an amazing firm. The dynamic between us was so different than most people. I actually made all the music, all the way back from 'Beam' until now, and then he would meet me on weekends and be kind of the leader of the DJ set. So he would prepare the set, I would write all the music, and then at almost the right moment, his life took off in a different direction while I started making other stuff other than dance music."

On February 13, 2018, a collaboration between Kill the Noise, Illenium and Mako, titled "Don't Give Up on Me", was released as single via Proximity. The song was initially leaked in the Reddit community by fans who revealed the link to the then-unreleased version of the song that was published on Mako's YouTube channel.

=== 2020: Release of Fable and musical evolution ===
In December 2020, Seaver released his sophomore album, Fable. This 11-track album marked a significant evolution in his musical style, blending elements of indie, pop, and electronic music to create a distinctive sound.

Fable features a mix of previously released singles and new compositions, including tracks like “Parable,” “Coyote,” “Peregrine,” and “Murder”.

Critics praised Fable for its emotive depth and innovative fusion of musical genres. The album was described as a “pivotal moment in Mako’s career,” reflecting his creative exploration and personal growth as an artist.

=== 2021–present: Arcane and debut as composer ===
In 2021, Seaver made his debut as a composer and music producer for Arcane, Netflix's critically acclaimed animated series based on the video game League of Legends. Seaver played a pivotal role as co-composer and songwriter for the series' first season, blending orchestral elements with electronic and alternative music to create a soundtrack praised for its depth and alignment with the show's emotional tone.

In 2024, Seaver stepped into the role of executive music producer for the second season of the series, overseeing the creative integration of custom compositions into the series' narrative. His work involved collaborating with Riot Games and a range of iconic artists to ensure that the music complemented the visual storytelling, solidifying Arcane's reputation for its immersive soundscape.

Seaver's contributions have been described as groundbreaking, with Arcane's soundtrack receiving widespread acclaim for its ability to bridge the gap between animation and cinematic scoring.

In March 2025, Seaver produced a song to feature in the upcoming Netflix series "Devil May Cry", titled "Afterlife", performed by Evanescence. This was co-written with Evanescence's Amy Lee, marking her first release under the Netflix label.

== Discography ==
=== Studio albums ===
Title	Details	Peak chart positions
Title	Details	US Dance
Hourglass	Released: December 9, 2016; Label: Ultra Records; Format: Digital download	5
Fable	Released: December 18, 2020; Label: Ultra Music; Format: Digital download	—
"—" denotes an album that did not chart or was not released.

=== Singles ===
==== As lead artist ====
Title	Year	Peak chart positions				Album
Title	Year	BEL (V)	BEL (W)	US Digital	US Dance	Album
"You Were Here"	2013	–	—	—	—	Non-album singles
"Into the Light" (with Sander van Doorn and DubVision featuring Mariana Bell)	2013	1 (Note: Did not enter the Ultratop 50, but peaked on the Dance Bubbling Under chart.)	16	—	—	Non-album singles
"Beam (Dannic Mix)"	2013	–	—	—	—	Non-album singles
"Our Story"	2014	–	—	—	—	Non-album singles
"Sunburst"	2014	–	—	—	—	Non-album singles
"Ghosts"	2014	–	—	—	—	Non-album singles
"I Won't Let You Walk Away" (featuring Madison Beer)	2015	–	–	33	43	Non-album singles
"Not Alone" (with Paris & Simo)	2015	–	—	—	—	Non-album singles
"Smoke Filled Room"	2015	–	–	20	27	Hourglass
"Way Back Home"	2015	–	—	—	—	Hourglass
"Into the Sunset"	2016	–	—	—	—	Hourglass
"Wish You Back (The Him Radio Edit)" (featuring Kwesi)	2016	–	—	—	—	Hourglass
"Let Go of the Wheel"	2016	–	—	—	—	Hourglass
"Breathe"	2017	–	—	—	—	Fable
"Murder"	2018	–	—	—	—	Fable
"Coyote"	2019	–	—	—	—	Fable
"Chameleon" (Solo or with Elephante)	2020	–	—	—	—	Fable
"Parable"	2020	—	—	—	—	Fable
"Again"	2020	—	—	—	—	Fable
"Ocelot"	2020	—	—	—	—	Fable
"—" denotes a recording that did not chart or was not released in that territory.

==== As featured artist ====
Single	Year
"Can't Stop This Feeling" (Greg Cerrone featuring Mako and Angel Taylor)	2013
"Children of the Wild" (Steve Angello featuring Mako)	2015
"Legends Never Die" (League of Legends featuring Against the Current and Mako)	2017
"Don't Give Up on Me" (Illenium and Kill the Noise featuring Mako)	2018
"Rise" (Mako, The Glitch Mob, and The Word Alive)	2018
"Lose You Now" (Lindsey Stirling featuring Mako)	2020
"Misfit Toys" (League of Legends featuring Pusha T and Mako)	2021
"What Have They Done To Us" (League of Legends featuring Mako, Grey and Sasha Alex Sloan)	2024

=== Remixes ===
Title	Year	Album	Label
"Spaceman" (Mako Orchestral Remix) (by Hardwell)	2012	Non-album single	Revealed Recordings
"Shadow of the Sun" (by Max Elto)	2014	Shadow of the Sun Remixes	Atlantic Records
"Piercing Light" (League of Legends theme song)	2016	Warsongs	None (Promoted by Riot Games)

=== Production credits ===
Title	Year	Album	Label
"Chinatown" (by Alex Gaudino featuring Angel Taylor)	2013	Non-album single	Ultra
"Long Road To Hell" (by Avicii)	2013	True	PRMD
"Come Together" (by Le Castle Vania featuring Mariana Bell)	2014	Feels Like Fire	Always Never Records
"When the Lights Go Out" (by Will Sparks featuring Troi)	2014	Non-album single	Ultra
"Don't Say You Do" (by Lola Blanc)	2016	The Magic	LB Music
"On and On" (by Arston)	2016	Non-album single	Armada Music
"Alive" (by Dannic featuring Mahkenna)	2017	Non-album single	BIGMGMT
"I Just Can't" (by R3hab and Quintino)	2017	Trouble	R3hab Music
"Complicated Love" (by Alex Mattson)	2018	Eleven	Sony
"Awaken" (by League of Legends, Valerie Brouchard & Ray Chen)	2019	Non-album single	Riot Games
"Starts Right Here" (by League of Legends ft. Kenny Mason & Foreign Air)	2021	Non-album single	Riot Games
"Playground" (by League of Legends ft. Bea Miller)	2021	Arcane League of Legends	Riot Games
"Goodbye" (by League of Legends ft. Ramsey)	2021	Arcane League of Legends	Riot Games
"Guns for Hire' (By League of Legends ft. Woodkid)	2021	Arcane League of Legends	Riot Games
"Misfit Toys" (by League of Legends ft. Pusha T & Mako)	2021	Arcane League of Legends	Riot Games
"What Could Have Been" (by League of Legends, ft. Sting & Ray Chen)	2021	Arcane League of Legends	Riot Games
"GODS" (by League of Legends ft. NewJeans)	2023	Non-album single	Riot Games
"Eye of the Untold Her" (by Lindsey Stirling)	2024	Duality	Concord Records
"Heavy Is The Crown (Original Score)" (by League of Legends ft. Mike Shinoda & Emily Armstrong)	2024	Arcane League of Legends: Season 2	Riot Games
"I Can't Hear It Now" (by League of Legends ft. Freya Ridings)	2024	Arcane League of Legends: Season 2	Riot Games
"Sucker" (by League of Legends ft. Marcus King)	2024	Arcane League of Legends: Season 2	Riot Games
"Renegade (We Never Run)" (by League of Legends ft. Raja Kumari, Stefflon Don, & Jarina De Marco)	2024	Arcane League of Legends: Season 2	Riot Games
"Hellfire" (by League of Legends ft. FEVER 333)	2024	Arcane League of Legends: Season 2	Riot Games
"To Ashes and Blood" (by League of Legends ft. Woodkid)	2024	Arcane League of Legends: Season 2	Riot Games
"Blood Sweat & Tears" (by League of Legends ft. Sheryl Lee Ralph)	2024	Arcane League of Legends: Season 2	Riot Games
"What Have They Done To Us" (by League of Legends ft. Mako & Grey)	2024	Arcane League of Legends: Season 2	Riot Games
"The Beast" (by League of Legends ft. Misha Mansoor)	2024	Arcane League of Legends: Season 2	Riot Games
"Spin The Wheel" (by League of Legends ft. Mick Wingert)	2024	Arcane League of Legends: Season 2	Riot Games
"Afterlife" (by Evanescence)	2025	Devil May Cry (Soundtrack from the Netflix Series)	Netflix Music
