= 3OH!3 discography =

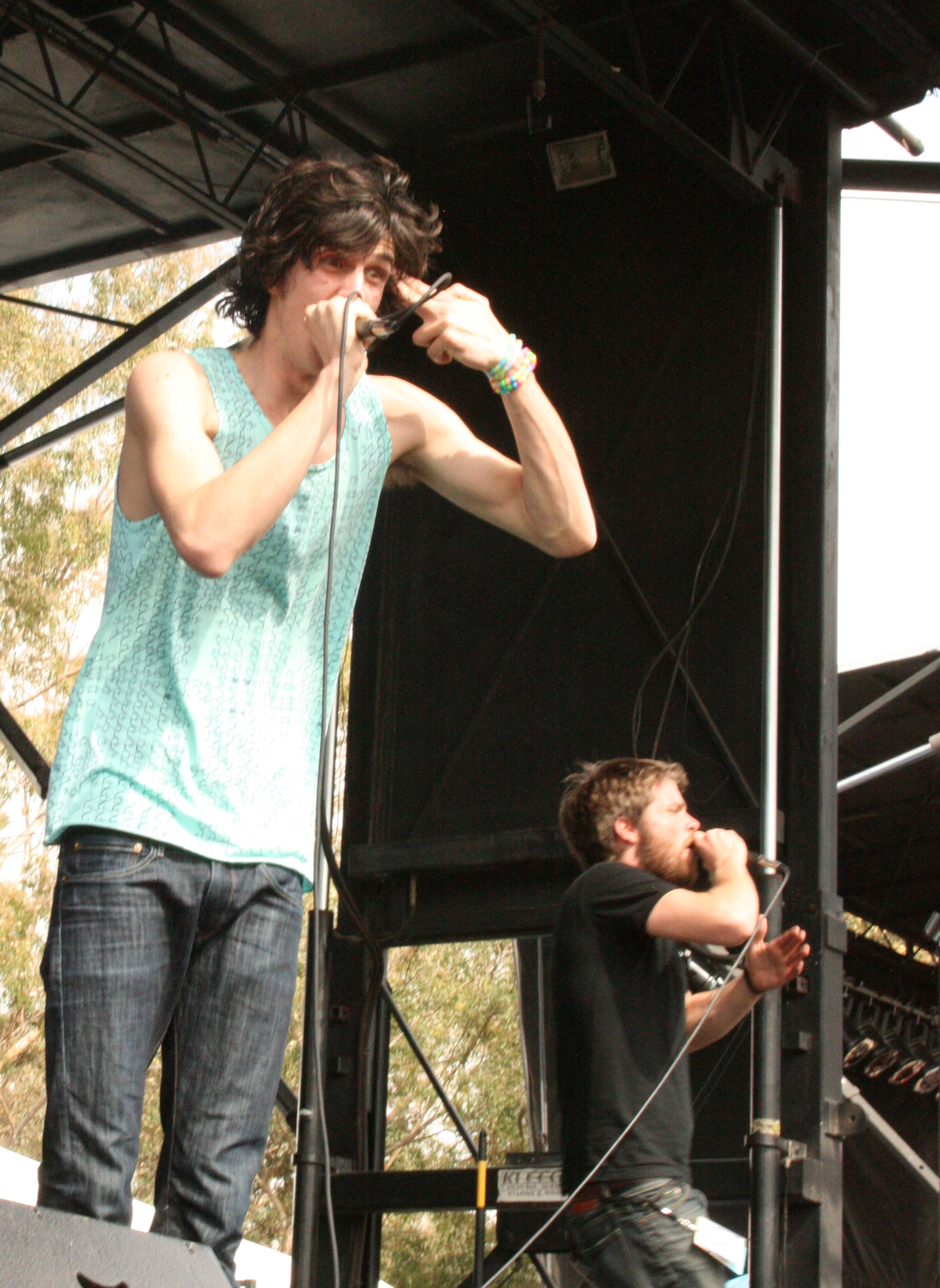
- 3OH!3 at Bamboozle Left 2008
- Studio albums: 6
- Extended plays: 4
- Singles: 23
- Music videos: 27
- Promotional singles: 14

The discography of 3OH!3, an American electropop group, contains six studio albums, four extended plays and 23 singles. The duo independently released their self-titled debut studio album in 2007. They are best known for their single "Don't Trust Me" from their second studio album Want, which reached number seven on the Billboard Hot 100. The single was certified 5× Platinum by the Recording Industry Association of America. Their second single, a remix of "Starstrukk" featuring Katy Perry from the album, was a top ten hit in the United Kingdom, Ireland, Finland, and Australia. Want, released in 2008, via Photo Finish Records, peaked at number 44 on the Billboard 200. The album was certified platinum by the RIAA. They gained further recognition by featuring Kesha on the song "My First Kiss", which was made the lead single from their third studio album Streets of Gold. The song peaked at number nine on the Billboard Hot 100. The album later peaked at number seven on the Billboard 200. Their fourth studio album Omens, released in 2013, peaked at number 81 on the Billboard 200.

In 2016, the duo signed with Fueled by Ramen and released their fifth studio album, Night Sports. The album peaked at number 170 on the Billboard 200. In 2021, their sixth studio album, Need was released via Photo Finish.

== Studio albums ==
List of studio albums, with selected chart positions, sales figures and certifications
| Title | Details | Peak chart positions | | | | | | | | | | Sales | Certifications |
| Title | Details | US | US Dance | AUS | CAN | GER | IRL | JPN | SCO | UK | UK Dance | Sales | Certifications |
|---|---|---|---|---|---|---|---|---|---|---|---|---|---|
| 3OH!3 | Released: July 2, 2007; Label: Self-released; Formats: CD | — | — | — | — | — | — | — | — | — | — | | |
| Want | Released: July 8, 2008; Label: Photo Finish; Formats: CD, digital download | 44 | 2 | — (Note: "Want" did not enter the Australian ARIA Albums Chart but peaked at number four on the ARIA Hitseekers Albums Chart.) | 41 | — | — | — | 79 | 77 | 1 | US: 455,000 | RIAA: Platinum |
| Streets of Gold | Released: June 29, 2010; Label: Photo Finish; Formats: CD, digital download | 7 | 1 | 75 | 10 | 99 | 79 | 62 | 12 | 19 | — | US: 41,000 | |
| Omens | Released: June 18, 2013; Label: Photo Finish, Atlantic; Formats: CD, digital download | 81 | 5 | — | — | — | — | 137 | — | — | — | | |
| Night Sports | Released: May 13, 2016; Label: Fueled by Ramen, Atlantic; Formats: CD, digital download | 170 | 2 | — | — | — | — | — | — | — | — | | |
| Need | Released: August 27, 2021; Label: Photo Finish; Formats: Digital download, streaming | — | — | — | — | — | — | — | — | — | — | | |
"—" denotes a recording that did not chart or was not released in that territory.

== Extended plays ==
List of extended plays, with selected chart positions
| Title | Details | Peak chart positions |
| Title | Details | US Dance |
|---|---|---|
| 3OH!3 / Innerpartysystem Split 7" | Released: January 9, 2009; Formats: Digital download; Label: Photo Finish | — |
| Live Session (iTunes Exclusive) | Released: January 16, 2009; Label: Photo Finish; Formats: Digital download | 11 |
| SHT: From the Vault | Released: March 2, 2012; Label: Photo Finish; Formats: Digital download | — |
| BTL/YGLT (Remixes) | Released: May 31, 2013; Label: Photo Finish; Formats: Digital download | — |

== Singles ==
=== As lead artist ===
List of singles as lead artist, with selected chart positions and certifications, showing year released and album name
| Title | Year | Peak chart positions | | | | | | | | | | Certifications | Album |
| Title | Year | US | AUS | AUT | BEL (FL) | CAN | EU | GER | IRL | NZ | UK | Certifications | Album |
|---|---|---|---|---|---|---|---|---|---|---|---|---|---|
| "Holler Till You Pass Out" | 2006 | — | — | — | — | — | — | — | — | — | — | | 3OH!3 |
| "Electroshock" | 2007 | — | — | — | — | — | — | — | — | — | — | | 3OH!3 |
| "Don't Trust Me" | 2008 | 7 | 3 | — | — (Note: "Don't Trust Me" did not enter the Flanders Ultratop 50, but charted at three on the Flanders Ultratip chart.) | 6 | 64 | 95 | 17 | 8 | 21 | RIAA: 5× Platinum; ARIA: Platinum; BPI: Gold; MC: 3× Platinum; RMNZ: Platinum | Want |
| "Starstrukk" (featuring Katy Perry) | 2009 | 66 | 4 | 48 | 21 | 31 | 19 | — | 4 | 16 | 3 | RIAA: 2× Platinum; ARIA: 2× Platinum; BPI: Platinum; RMNZ: Platinum | Want |
| "Still Around" | 2009 | — | — | — | — | — | — | — | — | — | — | | Want |
| "My First Kiss" (featuring Kesha) | 2010 | 9 | 13 | 28 | — (Note: "My First Kiss" did not enter the Flanders Ultratop 50, but charted at nine on the Flanders Ultratip chart.) | 7 | 23 | 37 | 10 | 15 | 7 | RIAA: Gold; ARIA: Platinum; BPI: Silver; MC: Platinum; RMNZ: Gold | Streets of Gold |
| "Double Vision" | 2010 | 87 | 42 | — | — | 49 | — | — | — | — | 133 | | Streets of Gold |
| "Touchin' on My" | 2011 | 49 | — | — | — | 22 | — | — | — | — | — | | Streets of Gold |
| "You're Gonna Love This" | 2012 | — (Note: "You're Gonna Love This" did not enter the Billboard Hot 100, but peaked at number 25 on the Bubbling Under Hot 100 Singles chart.) | 32 | — | — | 87 | — | — | — | — | — | | Omens |
| "Youngblood" | 2013 | — | — | — | — | — | — | — | — | — | — | | Omens |
| "Back to Life" | 2013 | — (Note: "Back to Life" did not enter the Billboard Hot 100, but peaked at number 15 on the Bubbling Under Hot 100 Singles chart.) | — | — | — | 93 | — | — | — | — | — | | Omens |
| "My Dick" | 2015 | — | — | — | — | — | — | — | — | — | — | | Night Sports |
| "Mad at You" | 2016 | — | — | — | — | — | — | — | — | — | — | | Night Sports |
| "BASMF" | 2016 | — | — | — | — | — | — | — | — | — | — | | Night Sports |
| "Hear Me Now" | 2016 | — | — | — | — | — | — | — | — | — | — | | Night Sports |
| "Freak Your Mind" | 2016 | — | — | — | — | — | — | — | — | — | — | | Night Sports |
| "Lonely Machines" (featuring 100 gecs) | 2020 | — | — | — | — | — | — | — | — | — | — | | Need |
| "Kissletoe" | 2020 | — | — | — | — | — | — | — | — | — | — | | Non-album single |
| "I'm So Sad" | 2021 | — | — | — | — | — | — | — | — | — | — | | Need |
| "Last Breath" | 2021 | — | — | — | — | — | — | — | — | — | — | | Need |
| "Vampire's Diet" (with Bert McCracken) | 2021 | — | — | — | — | — | — | — | — | — | — | | Need |
| "Slushie" | 2025 | — | — | — | — | — | — | — | — | — | — | | Non-album single |
| "Hit Me Harder" | 2025 | — | — | — | — | — | — | — | — | — | — | | Non-album single |
| "My Friends" | 2026 | — | — | — | — | — | — | — | — | — | — | | Non-album single |
"—" denotes a recording that did not chart or was not released in that territory.

=== As featured artist ===
List of singles as featured artist, with selected chart positions and certifications, showing year released and album name
| Title | Year | Peak chart positions | | | | | | | | | | Certifications | Album |
| Title | Year | US | AUS | BEL (FL) | CAN | CZE Air. | GER | IRE | NZ | SWI | UK | Certifications | Album |
|---|---|---|---|---|---|---|---|---|---|---|---|---|---|
| "Blah Blah Blah" (Kesha featuring 3OH!3) | 2010 | 7 | 3 | 45 | 3 | 20 | 11 | 18 | 7 | 30 | 11 | RIAA: 3× Platinum; ARIA: Platinum; BPI: Silver; MC: 2× Platinum; RMNZ: Gold | Animal |
| "Hey" (Lil Jon featuring 3OH!3) | 2010 | 62 | — | — | 48 | — | — | — | — | — | — | | Crunk Rock |
| "Friday (Remix)" (Rebecca Black featuring 3OH!3, Big Freedia and Dorian Electra) | 2021 | — | — | — | — | — | — | — | — | — | — | | Non-album singles |
| "The Outside (Outsiders Version)" (Boys Like Girls featuring 3OH!3, State Champs, The Summer Set and The Ready Set) | 2023 | — | — | — | — | 24 | — | — | — | — | — | | Non-album singles |
"—" denotes a recording that did not chart or was not released in that territory.

=== Promotional singles ===
List of songs, with selected chart positions, showing year released and album name
| Title | Year | Peak chart positions | | | Album |
| Title | Year | US | CAN | KOR | Album |
|---|---|---|---|---|---|
| "House Party" | 2010 | — | — | — | Streets of Gold |
| "Déjà Vu" | 2010 | 75 | — | 105 | Streets of Gold |
| "Hit It Again" | 2010 | 66 | 49 | — | Non-album single |
| "Robot" | 2011 | — | — | 77 | SHT: From the Vault |
| "Bang Bang" | 2011 | — | — | 72 | SHT: From the Vault |
| "Dirty Mind" | 2011 | — | — | 90 | SHT: From the Vault |
| "Set You Free" | 2011 | 84 | — | 34 | SHT: From the Vault |
| "Do or Die" | 2012 | — | — | 22 | Omens |
| "Turn the Night On" | 2013 | — | — | — | Non-album single |
| "7-11" | 2016 | — | — | — | Night Sports |
| "Tattooed Heart" | 2021 | — | — | — | Non-album singles |
| "Love Somebody" | 2021 | — | — | — | Non-album singles |
| "Light Down Low" | 2021 | — | — | — | Non-album singles |
| "Waste It On Me" | 2021 | — | — | — | Non-album singles |
"—" denotes a recording that did not chart or was not released in that territory.

== Other charted songs ==
List of songs, with selected chart positions, showing year released and album name
| Title | Year | Peak chart positions | | | | Certifications | Album |
| Title | Year | US | US Dance | CAN | KOR | Certifications | Album |
|---|---|---|---|---|---|---|---|
| "I'm Not Your Boyfriend Baby" | 2008 | — | 40 | — | — | RIAA: Gold | WANT |
| "Richman" | 2008 | — | — | — | — | RIAA: Gold | WANT |
| "Follow Me Down" (featuring Neon Hitch) | 2010 | 89 | — | 36 | 176 | | Almost Alice |
| "I Can Do Anything" | 2010 | 100 | — | — | — | | Streets of Gold |
| "We Are Young" | 2010 | — (Note: "We Are Young" did not enter the Billboard Hot 100, but peaked at number 23 on the Bubbling Under Hot 100 Singles chart.) | — | 70 | — | | Streets of Gold |
| "Two Girlfriends" | 2013 | — | — | — | 36 | | Omens |
"—" denotes a recording that did not chart or was not released in that territory.

=== Other appearances ===
| Title | Year | Album |
|---|---|---|
| "Bad Guy" | 2013 | Iron Man 3: Heroes Fall |
| "Black Box" | 2016 | 2016 Warped Tour Compilation |

== Music videos ==
=== As lead artist ===
List of music videos as lead artist, showing year released and directors
| Title | Year | Director(s) |
|---|---|---|
| "Holler Till You Pass Out" | 2006 | Isaac Ravishankara |
| "Electroshock" | 2007 | Isaac Ravishankara |
| "Don't Trust Me" | 2009 | Travis Kopach/Issac Ravishankara |
| "Starstrukk" (Web version) | 2009 | Steve Jocz |
| "Starstrukk" | 2009 | Marc Klasfeld / Steve Jocz |
| "Still Around" | 2009 | Sean Foreman |
| "House Party" | 2010 | Isaac Ravishankara |
| "My First Kiss" | 2010 | Isaac Ravishankara |
| "Double Vision" | 2010 | Evan Bernard |
| "Touchin' on My" | 2010 | Isaac Ravishankara |
| "Robot" | 2011 | Mike Diva |
| "You're Gonna Love This" | 2012 | Isaac Ravishankara |
| "Back to Life" | 2013 | Mickey Finnegan |
| "Two Girlfriends" | 2013 | —N/a |
| "My Dick" | 2015 | Tony Yacenda |
| "Mad At You" | 2016 | Issac Ravishankara |
| "BASMF" | 2016 | Christopher Smith |
| "Hear Me Now" | 2016 | Djay Brawner |
| "Freak Your Mind" | 2016 | Djay Brawner |
| "Lonely Machines" | 2020 | Weston Allen |
| "Kissletoe" | 2020 | —N/a |
| "I'm So Sad" | 2021 | Weston Allen |
| "Slushie" | 2025 | Cole Santiago |

=== As featured artist ===
List of music videos as featured artist, showing year released and directors
| Title | Year | Director(s) |
|---|---|---|
| "Blah Blah Blah" (Kesha featuring 3OH!3) | 2010 | Brendan Malloy |
| "Hey" (Lil Jon featuring 3OH!3) | 2010 | David Rousseau |
| "Friday (Remix)" (Rebecca Black featuring 3OH!3, Big Freedia and Dorian Electra) | 2021 | Weston Allen |
| "The Outside (Outsiders Version)" (Boys Like Girls featuring 3OH!3, State Champs, The Summer Set and The Ready Set) | 2023 | —N/a |
