= Touchin' on My =

Single by 3OH!3

from the album Streets of Gold
- Released: January 20, 2011
- Genre: Dance-pop; electropop
- Length: 3:03
- Label: Photo Finish
- Songwriter(s): Sean Foreman; Nathaniel Motte
- Producer(s): Matt Squire

3OH!3 singles chronology
"Hit It Again" (2010)	"Touchin' on My" (2011)	"You're Gonna Love This" (2012)

Music video
- "Touchin' on My" on YouTube

"Touchin' On My" is a song by American hip-hop duo 3OH!3. It was the first promotional single and the third single released from their third studio album Streets of Gold. It was released as a digital download on May 18, 2010, and was released as a single on January 20, 2011.

== Release ==
"Touchin' On My" was released on May 18, 2010, via iTunes as the first promotional single from Streets of Gold. It was later released as the album's third single on January 20, 2011, gaining radio airplay, as well as a music video released in promotion.

== Live performances ==
The duo performed the track during their tour with Cobra Starship in the spring of 2010. They also performed the song at the 2024 When We Were Young Festival.

== Critical reception ==
David Jeffries of AllMusic referred to the song as "cute", positively commenting on the use of "a censor's bleep into its synth pop melody". Emily Mackay of NME criticized the song, commenting that "There's no lamer sound in 'offensive' pop than the blarts in 'Touchin' On My': 'Touchin' on my -----While I'm touching on your ----- '". Jody Rosen of Rolling Stone stated that "The formula is the same: dopey electro rock bolstering "raps" about drinking ("Wake up next to pharaohs hung over in Cairo") and getting girls to "touch on" their privates", in reference to "I Know How to Say" and "Touchin' on My" respectively. Bree Davies of Westword stated that the track "follows a well-worn formula for 3OH!3: It's an EKG beat-styled sex jam that lyrically walks the thin line between jokey and raunchy. Though their music barely stands out among their pop-rap contemporaries -- er, Kesha."

== Chart performance ==
In the United States, "Touchin' on My" debuted and peaked at number 49 on the Billboard Hot 100 chart for the issue dated June 5, 2010. The song dropped to number 89 the following week, spending a total of two weeks on the chart. In Canada, the song also spent two weeks on the Canadian Hot 100 chart, having debuted and peaked at number 22 for the issue dated June 5, 2010.

== Music video ==
The video was filmed by director Isaac Ravishankara in December 2010. The video premiered on January 20, 2011. The music video starts with a man walking in his underwear out into the street and 3OH!3 runs the man over in their car. The music video is framed around Sean Foreman and Nathaniel Motte walking around different scenes rapping into the camera. To fit the theme of the song, the members faces, scenes, body parts are blurred out. One scene includes 3OH!3 walking into a room where an evidently pornographic scene is being filmed. Everything in those following scenes including the faces and body parts are blurred out. The ending of the video involves someone giving Motte a F*** and Foreman fighting over a bomb that is about to explode. They don't drop the bomb, this is a reference to how in the song "Touchin on My" the duo didn't drop the 'F-bomb' though it was implied throughout the song. Foreman gives Motte the bomb and runs and leave Motte alone, and the video fades to black as it explodes to Motte.

== Charts ==
Chart performance for "Touchin' On My"
Chart (2010)	Peak position
Canada (Canadian Hot 100)	22
US Billboard Hot 100	49

2022 chart performance for "Touchin' On My"
Chart (2022)	Peak position
Japan Hot Overseas (Billboard Japan)	7

== Release history ==
Release dates for "Touchin' On My"
Region	Date	Format	Label	Ref.
Various	May 18, 2010	Digital download	Photo Finish	
United States	January 20, 2011	Contemporary hit radio	Photo Finish	
