= My First Kiss =

2010 single by 3OH!3 featuring Kesha

Single by 3OH!3 featuring Kesha

from the album Streets of Gold
- Released: May 4, 2010
- Recorded: Summer 2008
- Genre: Electropop
- Length: 3:13
- Label: Photo Finish
- Songwriters: Lukasz Gottwald; Sean Foreman; Nathaniel Motte; Benjamin Levin
- Producers: Dr. Luke; Benny Blanco

3OH!3 singles chronology
"Blah Blah Blah" (2010)	"My First Kiss" (2010)	"Double Vision" (2010)

Kesha singles chronology
"Dirty Picture" (2010)	"My First Kiss" (2010)	"Your Love Is My Drug" (2010)

Music video
- "My First Kiss" on YouTube

"My First Kiss" is a song recorded by American electronic duo 3OH!3 featuring vocals from American singer Kesha. The song was written by Dr. Luke, Sean Foreman, Nathaniel Motte and Benny Blanco, and was produced by Dr. Luke and Blanco for their third studio album, Streets of Gold (2010). The song was released as the lead single from Streets of Gold on May 4, 2010. The song's inspiration is about going through one's first kiss and exploring further parts of a relationship.

Critical reception of the song was mixed. Though the song is 3OH!3's song, Kesha's feature on the track was praised by multiple critics for her strong delivery while 3OH!3's performance was met with mixed reviews, some calling them irritating. The song achieved commercial success by reaching the top ten in Canada, the United Kingdom and the United States, while charting within the top forty in multiple other countries. The song performed greatest in the United States reaching a peak of number nine on the Billboard Hot 100 and has gone on to sell 1,800,000 copies in the country as of 2016. The music video for "My First Kiss" follows a similar theme to its title. The dominant scenes of the video feature people kissing in front of multicolored backings with 3OH!3's logo present in much of the scenes. The song was performed on Regis and Kelly.

Ashley Tisdale sang the parts of Kesha with the duo 3OH!3 in the episode "Worried Baby Blues" on her television series, Hellcats, and the original version of the song used in other episode "I Say a Little Prayer" of the same series. The song was used in the 2012 film American Reunion, and was also included on the official soundtrack of the movie.

== Background and composition ==
"My First Kiss"
"My First Kiss" is an electropop song that uses "electro bleeps" and kissing noises as a backing.

"My First Kiss" was written by Sean Foreman and Nathaniel Motte alongside Dr. Luke and Benny Blanco. The song was produced by Dr. Luke and Benny Blanco with vocal editing done by Emily Wright. While being interviewed by MTV, Foreman explained the song's inspiration: "The song is about a girl you really like, and the story line of going through your first kiss with a girl to exploring further parts of the relationship." While composing the song, Foreman and Motte decided that they needed to add a female to the song. Kesha, who had worked with Blanco and Luke, was asked to participate in the song and later came into the studio to contribute her lines (the two had previously collaborated on Kesha's single Blah Blah Blah earlier that year).

"My First Kiss" is an upbeat dominant electropop song that incorporates elements of power pop. The song features elements of "electro bleeps" and a brief snippets of "beatbox sounds". Present throughout the song, are sounds of kissing noises in between verses. According to sheet music published at Musicnotes, the song is written in common time with a moderate beat rate of 138 beats per minute. The song is written in the key of E minor and the vocal range in the song spans from the note of E_{3} to the note of B_{4}. According to Sara D Anderson of AOL Radio, Kesha plays the role of a boy's first crush "who decides to not let him go past first base: 'She don't wanna give it up / Baby I can get it up / If I had it my way / Hey! I'll make you say.'"

== Critical reception ==
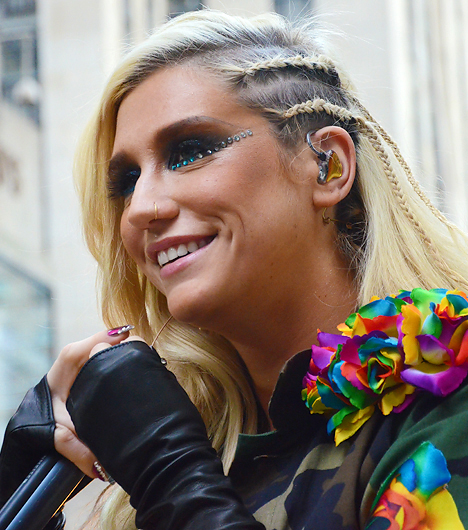
Kesha's (pictured) performance on the song was praised while 3OH!3's was met with mixed to negative reception.

Robert Copsey of Digital Spy met the song with a negative review. Copsey commended Kesha's work throughout the song calling her "cheeky (and a tad tipsy)". 3OH!3 however, were called "simply irritating". Copsey commented that the song was simply "another shouty electro-hop nugget that's as rowdy and intimidating as the school bully after a can of Red Bull". Fraser McAlpine from BBC was also negative in his review of the song. Like Copsey, McAlpine complimented Kesha's verses in the song noting it was his favorite part of the song, "The best bit is the playground rhyme, and Kesha's slurry delivery beats that of the '3 by MILES. It's probably cos she's flirting and they're shouting." He went on to criticize the song for being too similar to "Don't Trust Me," commenting, "There's not a lot in it between this and 'Don't Trust Me', musically or thematically speaking." McAlpine went on the give the song two out of five stars.

Bill Lamb of About.com met the song with a positive review giving the single four out of a possible five stars. Lamb wrote "[though] part of me wants to find this terribly annoying" that hardly matters as "3OH!3 and Kesha are probably the most gifted artists of the moment performing irresistibly catchy music". His conclusion of the song was, "like it or not, the 3OH!3 boys are back, and it looks like they plan to stay awhile."

== Commercial performance ==
In the United States, "My First Kiss" entered the US Billboard Hot 100 on the issue date titled May 22, 2010, at number nine where the single reached its peak. The song went on to sell over 500,000 copies in 2010 in the United States and has since been certified gold by the Recording Industry Association of America (RIAA). As of 2016, the song has now sold 1.8 million copies in the United States. In the same week, "My First Kiss" entered the Canadian Hot 100 at number seven where it also reached its peak. In October 2010 the single was certified platinum by the Canadian Recording Industry Association (CRIA) for sales of 80,000 units.

Internationally, "My First Kiss" entered the Australian charts at number 25. After steadily ascending the charts for seven weeks, the single reached a peak of 13 where it stayed for two weeks. The song was listed on the chart for a total of 17 weeks and has since received platinum certification by the Australian Recording Industry Association (ARIA) for sales of 70,000 units. In the United Kingdom, the single entered and peaked at number seven on its first week on the chart.

== Music video ==
The music video for "My First Kiss" was filmed in New York City by director, Isaac Ravishankara. The song's music video is relative to the song's theme: kissing. Foreman explained, "[And] the video is a play on kissing in general, and lips, and getting close up to a bunch of lips, and people coming out of mouths and just, like, really cool transitions." The video follows a similar theme that is relative to the song's title, "My First Kiss". It features a lot of people (punks, teachers, sailors, soldiers, lesbians, nerds, an elderly couple and hirsute rockers) "smooching, kissing, and making out." The video is made up of different scenes all using multi-colored backdrops as the video's dominant backing. The main scenes present are of "3OH!3 bouncing around and throw[ing] punches at the camera" while singing their versus and occasional close-ups of different pairs of lips that are mouthing different lyrics of the song. Kesha is also present throughout the video, mainly on her verses where she is seen in close-ups of her lips and dancing around the screen on the chorus.

At the end, the camera quickly zooms out to reveal that 3OH!3 are inside Ke$ha's mouth. She then eats them before kissing at the camera.

James Montgomery from MTV News reviewed the video for "My First Kiss" positively. Montgomery commented on how simple the song's video was but noted that wasn't a negative, he commented, "like pretty much everything 3OH!3 do, there's an undeniable charm to both the song and the video. Perhaps it's the power-tool chorus, or the "ooh-ooh-ooh" vocal harmonies. Maybe it's Kesha's sexy ass. Or maybe I just like watching a whole bunch of people lock lips. The whole thing is a lot of fun. It gets in your head. And hey, it's the summer — school's out, and gleefully stupid is in."

== Live performances ==
The song was performed live on Jimmy Kimmel Live! on June 30, 2010. The duo also appeared on The Tonight Show with Jay Leno on July 22, 2010, performing the song.

The song was performed live on Regis and Kelly on July 30, 2010.

== Awards and nominations ==
Awards and nominations for "My First Kiss"
Year	Organization	Award	Result	Ref(s)
2010	MTV Video Music Awards	Best Collaboration	Nominated	

=== Accolades ===
Accolades for "My First Kiss"
Publication	Country	Accolade	Year	Rank	Ref.
About.com	United States	Top 100 Songs of 2010	2010	61	

== Track listing ==
- Digital Download
1. "My First Kiss" (Feat. Kesha) – 3:12
- My First Kiss (Remix) – EP
1. "My First Kiss" (Gucci Mane Remix) (Feat. Kesha) – 3:12
2. "My First Kiss" (Chuckie Extended Version) (Feat. Kesha) – 7:34
3. "My First Kiss" (Innerpartysystem Remix) (Feat. Kesha) – 5:07
4. "My First Kiss" (Feat. Kesha) (Video) – 3:20
- UK My First Kiss – EP
1. "My First Kiss" (Feat. Kesha) – 3:12
2. "My First Kiss" (Chuckie Remix) (Feat. Kesha) – 3:39
3. "My First Kiss" (Chuckie Extended Version) (Feat. Kesha) – 7:34
4. "My First Kiss" (Innerpartysystem Remix) (Feat. Kesha) – 5:07
5. "My First Kiss" (Skeet Remix) – 4:42

== Credits and personnel ==
- Songwriting – Dr. Luke, Sean Foreman, Nathaniel Motte and Benny Blanco
- Production – Dr. Luke and Benny Blanco
- Engineering – Emily Wright, Sam Holland and Benny Blanco
- Instruments and programming – Dr. Luke, Nathaniel Motte and Benny Blanco
- Additional vocals – Dr. Luke and Benny Blanco
- Vocal Editing – Emily Wright

== Charts ==
=== Weekly charts ===
Weekly chart performance for "My First Kiss"
Chart (2010–2011)	Peak position
Australia (ARIA)	13
Austria (Ö3 Austria Top 40)	28
Belgium (Ultratip Bubbling Under Flanders)	9
Canada Hot 100 (Billboard)	7
Canada CHR/Top 40 (Billboard)	27
CIS Airplay (TopHit)	45
Europe (Billboard Euro Digital Songs)	11
European Hot 100 Singles (Billboard)	23
Germany (GfK)	37
Global Dance Songs (Billboard)	17
Ireland (IRMA)	10
Japan Hot 100 (Billboard)	38
Latvia (European Hit Radio)	26
Lithuania (European Hit Radio)	58
Mexico Ingles Airplay (Billboard)	14
New Zealand (Recorded Music NZ)	15
Russia Airplay (Tophit)	40
Scottish Singles Sales (Official Charts)	7
Singapore Airplay (Mediacorp)	9
South Korea Foreign (Circle)	5
UK Singles (Official Charts)	7
Ukraine Airplay (Tophit)	155
US Billboard Hot 100	9
US Pop Airplay (Billboard)	15
US Hot Ringtones (Billboard)	34

=== Year-end charts ===
Year-end chart performance for "My First Kiss"
Chart (2010)	Position
Australia (ARIA)	76
Canada Hot 100 (Billboard)	74
South Korea Foreign (Circle)	43
UK Singles (Official Charts)	128
US Billboard Hot 100	73

== Certifications and sales ==
Certifications for "My First Kiss"
Region	Certification	Certified units/sales
Australia (ARIA)	Platinum	70,000^{^}
Canada (Music Canada)	Platinum	80,000^{*}
New Zealand (RMNZ)	Gold	15,000^{‡}
United Kingdom (BPI)	Silver	200,000^{‡}
United States (RIAA)	Gold	1,800,000
^{*} Sales figures based on certification alone.^{^} Shipments figures based on certification alone.^{‡} Sales+streaming figures based on certification alone.

== Release history ==
Release dates for "My First Kiss"
Region	Date	Format
Australia	May 4, 2010	Digital download
Canada	May 4, 2010	Digital download
New Zealand	May 4, 2010	Digital download
Norway	May 4, 2010	Digital download
Ireland	July 1, 2010	Digital download
United Kingdom	July 1, 2010	Digital download
