= Follow Me Down =

Follow Me Down may refer to:

- "Follow Me Down" (3OH!3 song), 2010
- "Follow Me Down" (The Pretty Reckless song), 2014
- Follow Me Down (album), a 2011 album by Sarah Jarosz

== See also ==
- Follow You Down
- You'll Follow Me Down
