= Still Around =

Still Around may refer to:

- "Still Around" (3OH!3 song), from the 2008 album Want
- "Still Around", a song by Jennifer Lopez from the 2005 album Rebirth
- "Still Around", a song by Paloma Faith from the 2017 album The Architect
- "Still Around", a song by Pieta Brown from the 2005 album In the Cool
