= Back to Life (3OH!3 song) =

Single by 3OH!3

from the album Omens
- Released: March 5, 2013
- Recorded: Eden Studios (Los Angeles)
- Length: 3:45
- Label: Photo Finish
- Songwriters: Sean Foreman; Nathaniel Motte; Greg Kurstin
- Producers: 3OH!3; Kurstin

3OH!3 singles chronology
"Youngblood" (2013)	"Back to Life" (2013)	"My Dick" (2015)

"Back to Life" is a song by American hip-hop duo 3OH!3. It was released on March 5, 2013, as the third and final single from their fourth studio album Omens, via Photo Finish Records. The song was written by Sean Foreman, Nathaniel Motte and Greg Kurstin.

== Background ==
On March 3, 2013, the group revealed the release date for their fourth studio album, Omens, along with an announcement of the third single from the album, "Back to Life". The duo stated they would release the song if fans accomplished a series of tasks suggested by the duo. They eventually streamed the single on their website the following day, before it was released for digital download on March 5.

== Critical reception ==
Matt Collar of AllMusic felt that the track's "results are pretty trite." Kelly Gonsalves of The Pop Break stated, "this song is highly refreshing, even featuring some pleasant piano chords and just the kind of melody that makes you wanna throw your arm over a friend’s shoulder and wave your cell phone around in the air."

== Music video ==
The music video for "Back to Life" premiered on March 5, 2013, and was directed by Mickey Finnegan. The video sees the duo robbing a fish market at a grocery store which leads them into getting a fight with the butcher.

== Track listing ==
Digital download
No.	Title	Length
1.	"Back to Life"	3:45

CD single
No.	Title	Length
1.	"Back to Life" (Jidax Remix Club Mix)	6:56
2.	"Back to Life" (Stan SB Remix)	3:50

== Personnel ==
Credits for "Back to Life" adapted from album's liner notes.

3OH!3

- Sean Foreman – vocals, producer, mixing, engineering, recording
- Nathaniel Motte – vocals, producer, mixing, engineering, recording, programming

Production

- Greg Kurstin – producer, engineering
- Jesse Shatkin – engineering
- Chris Gehringer – mastering
- Recorded at Eden Studios, Los Angeles, California, United States

== Charts ==
Chart performance for "Back to Life"
Chart (2013)	Peak position
Canada Hot 100 (Billboard)	93
South Korea International Chart (GAON)	110
US Bubbling Under Hot 100 (Billboard)	15

== Release history ==
Release dates for "Back to Life"
Region	Date	Format	Label	Ref.
Various	March 5, 2013	Digital download	Photo Finish	
Sweden	March 5, 2013	CD single	Photo Finish	
United States	March 26, 2013	Mainstream airplay	Photo Finish	
