= Hit It Again =

Promotional single by 3OH!3
- Released: December 21, 2010
- Recorded: 2010
- Genre: Dance-pop; electropop; electronic rock; pop rock; pop rap
- Length: 3:03
- Label: Photo Finish
- Songwriters: Sean Foreman; Nathaniel Motte; Sam Hollander; Dave Katz
- Producers: S*A*M and Sluggo; Motte

3OH!3 singles chronology
"Hey" (2010)	"Hit It Again" (2010)	"Touchin' on My" (2011)

"Hit It Again" is a song by American electronic music duo 3OH!3. The song was released as a non-album promotional single on December 21, 2010, via Photo Finish Records.

== Release ==
The duo performed the track for the first time while on Warped Tour in June 2009 and received a positive reception. The track became a fan favorite, however it remained unreleased until it was exclusively released on iTunes on December 21, 2010.

== Composition ==
"Hit It Again" was written by Sean Foreman, Nathaniel Motte, Sam Hollander and Dave Katz, while production was handled by S*A*M and Sluggo and Motte.

== Chart performance ==
"Hit It Again" charted for one week on the Billboard Hot 100, for the week ending January 8, 2011, at number 66. The song also reached number 49 on the Canadian Hot 100.

== Personnel ==
Credits for "Hit It Again" adapted from digital liner notes.

- Sean Foreman – vocals, composer, lyricist
- Nathaniel Motte – vocals, composer, lyricist, instrumentation, producer, engineering
- S*A*M and Sluggo – producer
- Sam Hollander – composer, lyricist
- Dave Katz – composer, lyricist
- Sean Gould – mixing

== Charts ==
Chart performance for "Hit it Again"
Chart (2011)	Peak position
Canada Hot 100 (Billboard)	49
US Billboard Hot 100	66
