= Blah Blah Blah (Kesha song) =

2010 single by Kesha featuring 3OH!3

Single by Kesha featuring 3OH!3

from the album Animal
- Released: February 2, 2010
- Recorded: 2009
- Studio: Lotzah Matzah Studios, New York City, New York
- Genre: Electropop; dance-pop; Bitpop
- Length: 2:52
- Label: RCA Records
- Songwriters: Kesha Sebert; Benjamin Levin; Neon Hitch; Sean Foreman
- Producer: Benny Blanco

Kesha singles chronology
"Tik Tok" (2009)	"Blah Blah Blah" (2010)	"Dirty Picture" (2010)

3OH!3 singles chronology
"Still Around" (2009)	"Blah Blah Blah" (2010)	"My First Kiss" (2010)

Music video
- "Blah Blah Blah" on YouTube

"Blah Blah Blah" is a song by American singer Kesha from her debut album, Animal (2010). Produced by Benny Blanco, and co-written by Kesha, Blanco, Neon Hitch and Sean Foreman, it was released as the album's second single on February 2, 2010, and features American musical duo 3OH!3. Initial writing of the song took place when Kesha, Blanco, Hitch and Foreman were discussing which sex talked more and which one was more "obnoxious." The song is a midtempo electropop song that speaks of men in the same way that they have talked about women in the music industry. The lyrics depict a woman who would rather have sex than listen to a man speak and features blatant come-ons throughout the song.

The single achieved commercial success by reaching the top five in Australia and Canadian Hot 100, while charting within the top ten on the United States Billboard Hot 100, New Zealand, and Luxembourg. The song became Kesha's second top ten single in Australia, Canada and the United States. It was certified 3× platinum by the Recording Industry Association of America (RIAA) for selling three million equivalent units in the United States.

The music video for "Blah Blah Blah" was directed by Brendan Malloy. The video follows similar suit to the song's lyrics. It depicts Kesha getting hit on by a variety of different men and her continually rejecting them. Kesha and 3OH!3 performed the song on the ninth season of American Idol to promote the single.

== Writing and inspiration ==
"Blah Blah Blah" was written by Kesha alongside Neon Hitch, Sean Foreman, and Benny Blanco, who also produced the ballad. Kesha said that the ballad originated from a discussion they had in the studio on the politics of female-male relationships which Kesha later explained, "The song came about when the people that wrote it — me, Benny Blanco, Neon Hitch and [3OH!3's] Sean Foreman — all got in a room, and they were talking about how chicks talk too much," [...] "And me and Neon were like, 'No, no, no, guys talk too much," [...] "So, we had this war of who were more obnoxious, chicks or dudes. And the song kind of came around from that conversation. I think I make a pretty fair point both in this video and in the song, that dudes are way more annoying."

== Composition ==
"Blah Blah Blah"
"Blah Blah Blah" is a midtempo electropop song composed in D minor. Its lyrics depict a woman that would rather have sex than talk and featured blatant come-ons.

"Blah Blah Blah" is a midtempo electropop song; the song utilizes synthesizers and drum machines in its production. It is written in the key of D minor and Kesha's vocal range in the song spans from the note of D_{3} to the note of D_{5}. Lyrically, "Blah Blah Blah" depicts a woman who would rather have sex than listen to a man speak as the singer finds talkative men annoying; blatant come-ons such as "show me where your dick's at" and "I wanna be naked" leave this literal meaning unambiguous. Kesha herself has been frank about this straightforward interpretation of the lyrics. The lyrics have been interpreted as a shot at the way men objectify women by speaking about them the way that they do in the music industry. " Andrew Burgess of MusicOMH felt that the line "I don't really care where you live at, just turn around boy, let me hit that. Don't be a little bitch with your chit-chat; just show me where your dick's at" was a way of belittling her male peers. Fraser McAlpine of BBC noted that it was cultural progress that a woman can now "sing a song[...] as dirty [...] as her male peers".

== Critical reception ==
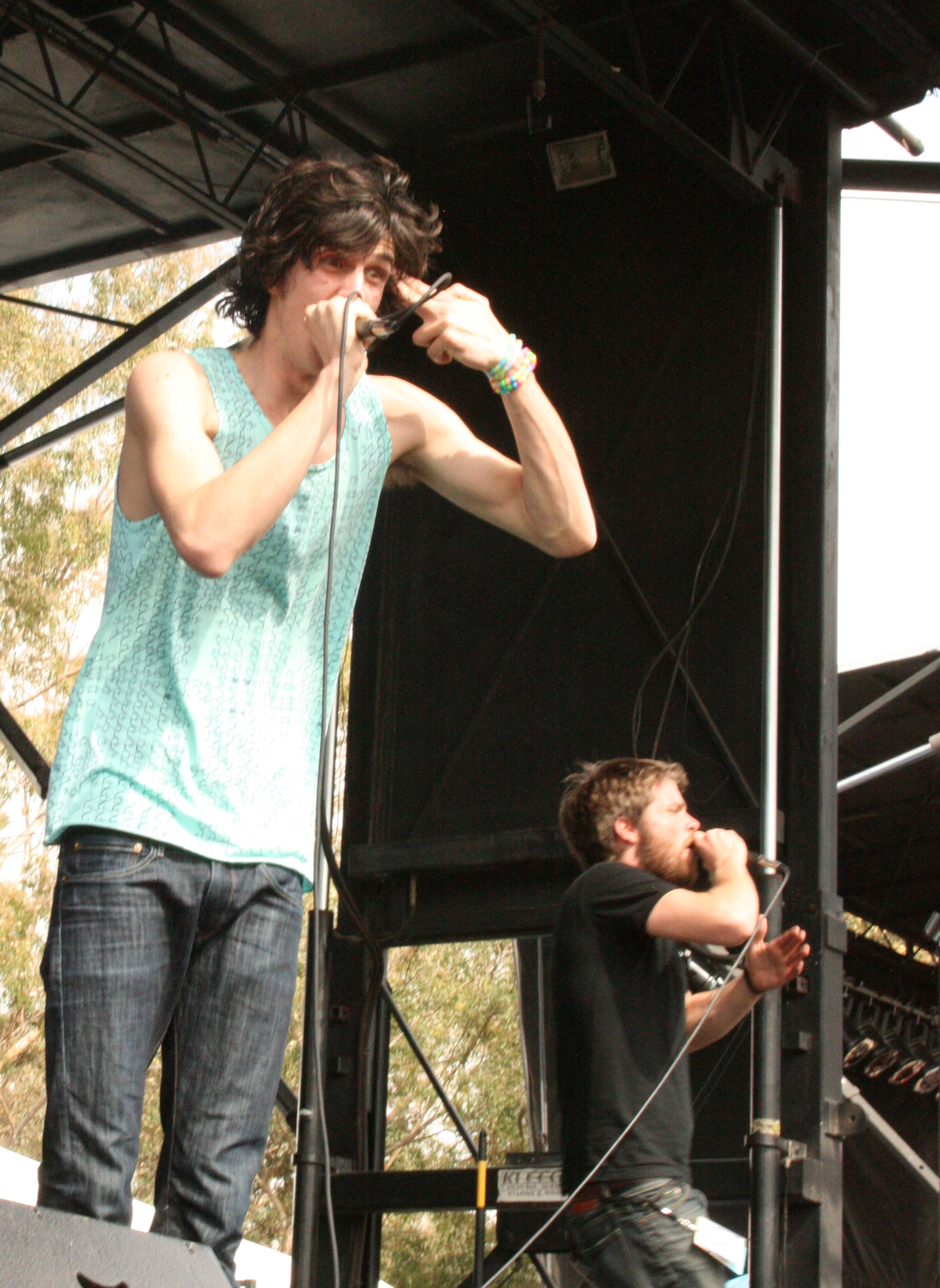
Critics were divided over the pairing of Kesha and 3OH!3 (pictured), with some calling 3OH!3's appearance superfluous and noting she out performed them. The two would collaborate again later that year on 3OH!3's single "My First Kiss".

Fraser McAlpine of the BBC was impressed with the song saying "it's a sign of cultural progress that a modern pop lass can sing a song which is exactly as dirty as the kind of song her male peers would risk." Comparing Kesha's vocal delivery to that of Eminem, he also compared the hook, "you tah-tah-tawkin' that Blah Blah Blah" to "Bad Romance" by Lady Gaga, stating that the song was a "rural, farm-girl spin" of it. Jim Farber of the New York Daily News stated that the track "could become the 'whatever' anthem of the season." It was described by the Winnipeg Free Press as a "hard pop-hop cut with pogo-worthy beats." Daniel Brockman of The Phoenix thought that Kesha "intone[d] in a lusty, disturbingly carefree tone" on the song.

Ann Powers of the Los Angeles Times said that "Blah Blah Blah" was one of those "moments on Animal that are nearly as experimental as an Animal Collective record, but instead of some wistful, Brian Wilson-loving artiste at the song's center, there's this girl, rolling her eyes and snapping her gum." Melanie Bertoldi from Billboard magazine also thought that the verse by 3OH!3 "severely slow[ed] down the momentum and never quite gel[ed] with Kesha's catty, aggressive delivery," but praised the song for its "danceability". Andrew Burgess of MusicOMH said that while "3OH!3 makes a lame attempt to assert the case for male equality [on the song], Kesha comes off as so infectiously dominating, it's hard to take [3OH!3] seriously." Mayer Nissim of Digital Spy gave the song two out of five stars, stating that it was not as catchy as her debut, slamming the lyrics for being "thick" and adding that she failed to deliver on many lines, calling them "faux-outrageous, faux-feminist trash". Melinda Newman of HitFix criticized the song, calling 3OH!3 "slumming" and "wretched."

== Commercial performance ==
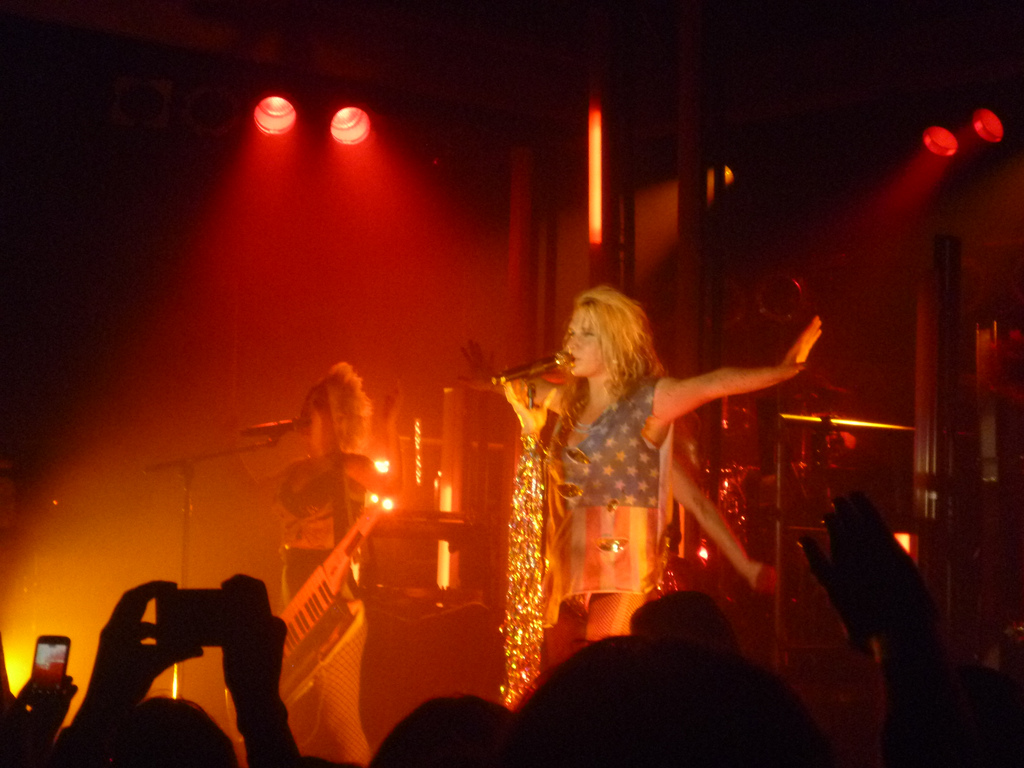
Kesha performing "Blah Blah Blah" at the Get Sleazy Tour

In the United States, "Blah Blah Blah" debuted on the Billboard Hot 100 at position seven, and on the Hot Digital Songs chart at number two, selling a total of 206,000 downloads, both chartings would become the songs' peaks. On Billboard's Pop chart, the song reached a peak of eleven. As of March 2016, "Blah Blah Blah" has also sold 2.4 million digital copies in the US. As of 2024, the song has since received a 3× Platinum certification by the Recording Industry Association of America for accomplishing sales of 3 million equivalent units in the country. In Canada, "Blah Blah Blah" debuted on the Canadian Hot 100 at position three, which became its peak. It has since gone on to be certified 2× Platinum in Canada by the CRIA (Canadian Recording Industry Association) for selling 160,000 units.

In Australia, "Blah Blah Blah" entered the Australian chart at position seven on the week of January 24, 2010. The following week the song moved to position four, where it held the spot for three consecutive weeks. On the song's fifth week on the chart, it reached its peak at position three where it held the spot for one week. The song was certified double-platinum by the Australian Recording Industry Association (ARIA) for equivalent sales of 140,000 units. In New Zealand, the song debuted and peaked at position seven. It later went on to receive gold certification by the Recording Industry Association of New Zealand (RIANZ) for sales of 7,500 units. "Blah Blah Blah" made its debut onto the UK Singles Chart at number eleven on the issue dated February 7, 2010 with sales of 27,161.

== Music video ==
Kesha in the music video, duct taping a man's mouth closed in response to his attempt to hit on her.

The music video for the song was directed by Brendan Malloy. It premiered on February 23, 2010, on Vevo. Both members of 3OH!3 make an appearance in the video. Kesha told MTV that the video primarily involves men (described as "douchey") hitting on Kesha, while she declines their advances. "At one point," Kesha says "I get to be strapped to this harness and bouncing around everywhere, and it was really cool [...] The whole concept of the video was a bunch of douche-y guys macking on me as usual, and me making them eat their toupees or other various items". Melanie Bertoldi of Billboard said that the clip was "thoroughly entertaining".

In the first scene, outside of a club, Kesha is hit on by comedian Bret Ernst. He tries to convince Kesha that they would make a good couple, meanwhile Kesha texts someone, describing the man as a "major douchemaster". The next scene has Kesha at a bar playing pool near a man, where she duct-tapes him, later pulling down his pants, after describing him as a "tool bag" in a text message. In an arcade, Kesha pushes a man away who is making conversation with her. The third suitor attempts to serenade Kesha with a guitar, to which Kesha replies by stuffing paper in his mouth. In the final sequence, a man tries to talk to Kesha in a bowling alley. She loses interest when his toupée falls off his head and she shoves the hairpiece into his mouth, in vein of the previous arcade scene. The video ends with Kesha and 3OH!3 singing and dancing together in the bowling lanes.

== Live performances ==
The song was first performed live for MTV Push, a program broadcast by MTV Networks worldwide. It was also performed on January 18, 2010, at MuchOnDemand, broadcast on Canadian cable music channel, MuchMusic. Kesha performed for the first time a heavily censored version of the song on the ninth season of American Idol with 3OH!3 on March 17, 2010. In the United Kingdom, Kesha made two appearances to perform the song. The first was on February 18, 2010, Alan Carr: Chatty Man. It was followed by a performance on breakfast television show GMTV, on February 19. She also performed the song in a set for BBC Radio 1's Big Weekend, as well as Willkommen Bei Mario Barth Live in Germany and So You Think You Can Dance in Australia.

== Track listing ==
- CD
1. "Blah Blah Blah" – 2:52
- Digital download
1. "Blah Blah Blah" – 2:52
2. "Tik Tok" (Joe Bermudez club Mix) – 5:09
- UK digital download (EP)
1. "Blah Blah Blah" – 2:52
2. "Tik Tok" (Joe Bermudez club mix) – 5:09
3. "Tik Tok" (Trey Told 'Em remix) – 4:14

== Credits and personnel ==
- Songwriting – Kesha Sebert, Benny Blanco, Neon Hitch, Sean Foreman
- Production – Benny Blanco, Dr. Luke (as Executive Producer)
- Instruments and programming – Benny Blanco
- Recording – Benny Blanco
- Engineering – Benny Blanco

== Charts ==
=== Weekly ===
Weekly chart performance for "Blah Blah Blah"
Chart (2010)	Peak position
Australia (ARIA)	3
Austria (Ö3 Austria Top 40)	21
Belgium (Ultratop 50 Flanders)	45
Belgium (Ultratop 50 Wallonia)	31
Canada Hot 100 (Billboard)	3
Canada CHR/Top 40 (Billboard)	6
Canada Hot AC (Billboard)	33
Croatia International Airplay (HRT)	22
Czech Republic Airplay (ČNS IFPI)	20
Europe (Billboard Euro Digital Songs)	11
European Hot 100 Singles (Billboard)	36
France (SNEP) Download Charts	27
Germany (GfK)	11
Global Dance Songs (Billboard)	9
Ireland (IRMA)	18
Lithuania (European Hit Radio)	8
Luxembourg (Billboard)	9
Mexico Anglo (Monitor Latino)	7
Mexico Ingles Airplay (Billboard)	5
Netherlands (Dutch Top 40)	32
Netherlands (Single Top 100)	72
New Zealand (Recorded Music NZ)	7
Poland (Polish Airplay New)	2
Scottish Singles Sales (Official Charts)	7
South Korea (Circle)	41
South Korea Foreign (Circle)	1
Sweden (Sverigetopplistan)	38
Switzerland (Schweizer Hitparade)	30
UK Singles (Official Charts)	11
US Billboard Hot 100	7
US Dance Club Songs (Billboard)	37
US Pop Airplay (Billboard)	11
US Rhythmic Airplay (Billboard)	17

=== Year-end ===
Year-end chart performance for "Blah Blah Blah"
Chart (2010)	Position
Australia (ARIA)	41
Canada Hot 100 (Billboard)	43
Croatia International Airplay (HRT)	94
South Korea Foreign (Circle)	17
UK Singles (Official Charts)	122
US Billboard Hot 100	51

== Certifications and sales ==
Certifications and sales for "Blah Blah Blah"
Region	Certification	Certified units/sales
Australia (ARIA)	2× Platinum	140,000^{‡}
Canada (Music Canada)	2× Platinum	80,000^{*}
New Zealand (RMNZ)	Gold	7,500^{*}
South Korea	—	585,536
Sweden (GLF)	Gold	20,000^{‡}
United Kingdom (BPI)	Silver	200,000^{‡}
United States (RIAA)	3× Platinum	3,000,000^{‡}
^{*} Sales figures based on certification alone.^{‡} Sales+streaming figures based on certification alone.

== Release history ==
Release dates and formats for "Blah Blah Blah"
Region	Date	Format(s)	Label	Ref.
United States	February 2, 2010	Rhythmic contemporary radio	RCA	
Australia	February 19, 2010	CD; digital download	Sony	
South Korea	February 26, 2010	Digital download	Sony	
United Kingdom	February 28, 2010	Digital download	RCA	
United Kingdom	March 1, 2010	CD	Columbia	
Germany	April 23, 2010	CD	RCA	
