= Starstrukk =

2009 single by 3OH!3

Single by 3OH!3 featuring Katy Perry

from the album Want
- Released: August 4, 2009 (original version); September 8, 2009 (remix featuring Katy Perry)
- Genre: Electropop; pop rap
- Length: 3:04 (album version); 3:22 (remix featuring Katy Perry)
- Label: Photo Finish
- Songwriters: Sean Foreman; Nathaniel Motte
- Producers: Matt Squire; 3OH!3

3OH!3 singles chronology
"Don't Trust Me" (2008)	"Starstrukk" (2009)	"Still Around" (2009)

Katy Perry singles chronology
"Waking Up in Vegas" (2009)	"Starstrukk" (2009)	"If We Ever Meet Again" (2009)

Music video
- "Starstrukk (ft. Katy Perry)" on YouTube

"Starstrukk" is a song recorded by American group 3OH!3. It is their third single and their second single to be released from their second studio album, Want (2008), through Photo Finish Records. It is the follow-up to their debut single, "Don't Trust Me". The band wrote the song, an electropop and pop rap record, and produced it with Matt Squire. A radio-only and the deluxe album version was released, featuring fellow American artist Katy Perry. The original version was released as a single on the 4th of August, 2009, while the remix was released later that year, on the 8th of September.

The version featuring Perry had considerable success worldwide, peaking within the top ten of the charts in Australia, Belgium (Wallonia), Finland, Poland, the Republic of Ireland, and the United Kingdom. Two music videos were made for the track. The first, directed by Steve Jocz, was released on the 8th of June, 2009, while the second was directed by Jocz and Marc Klasfeld, and was nominated for Best International Group Video at the 2010 MuchMusic Video Awards. The song was later included on the deluxe edition of Perry’s third studio album Teenage Dream, specifically the second disc, Dream On.

== Background and release ==
3OH!3 was among the line-up of the Warped Tour 2008 where they met Katy Perry. The band then toured with her on the United Kingdom dates of her Hello Katy Tour in February 2009. They said of Perry's participation to the song: "Katy did this because we toured with Katy, we are good friends with Katy and we worked on the song together — we worked on the remix together." "Starstrukk" was chosen as the second single of their second studio album Want (2008). It impacted the US contemporary hit radio format on August 4, 2009. A remix version featuring American singer and songwriter Katy Perry was released next month, on September 8. Perry later included this remix on the deluxe edition of her third studio album Teenage Dream while 3OH!3 included this remix on the international edition of their third studio album Streets of Gold.

== Critical reception ==
Professional ratings
Review scores
Source	Rating
Digital Spy	2/5 stars

Nick Levine of Digital Spy gave the song a negative review. Though he praised the song for being "catchy," he felt that the song lacked substance stating, "Sadly, it's also hard to shake the feeling that if Iceland flogged electropop throbbers, this is the sort of cheap, meaningless electropop throbber they'd flog. The lyrics are filled with leering references to girls with 'double D's' wearing 'low-cut, see-through shirts,' while Perry, playing the cold-hearted romantic predator, is at her most grating and affected."

The song was the 46th most downloaded song of all time in the UK.

== Music videos ==
3OH!3 running as they are chased by a group consisting of numerous women down a street in the music video for "Starstrukk" (web version).

The music video for the song was premiered by AOL on Monday, June 8, 2009. A "behind the scenes" of the music video has been released prior to the release date. It was filmed in Los Angeles, California and directed by Sum 41's drummer, Steve Jocz. According to Rolling Stone, the video showcases throngs of girls dressed in fluorescent wardrobe chasing 3OH!3, a large clothed orgy with construction workers, a marching band and copious amounts of whipped cream. Jocz said the concept is a bunch of people getting clustered together until the eventually formed a massive dogpile. According to group member, Sean Foreman, "the video is looking awesome."

Sean Foreman commented on the video to an interview with MTV. He said the following:

There's a mat on the floor and there's liquid spilled all over the place [...] The concept of the video is one that we brainstormed up. It has to do with a dog pile and crazy body parts and hot legs and boobs and football players. There are all sorts of body fluids involved. Different types. Blood, spit, a couple we can't mention. You're going to see people flying off a doggy pile, like, flying up into the atmosphere, and at the end, it's revealed it's in reverse motion, so it's just people dog-piling on us. It's movie magic, because we're actually not even in the video. They're CGI-ing taller, better looking people in our places. It works out well."

The second music video for "Starstrukk", which was directed by Marc Klasfeld and Steve Jocz, and includes Katy Perry, was shot at the Los Angeles County Natural History Museum's Rose Garden in Exposition Park on Monday, September 21, 2009. The video shows 3OH!3 sitting at a fountain where they retrieve coins that have been thrown in, causing women to begin pursuing them. In other scenes, Perry and 3OH!3 sing together in front of the fountain. During her verse, Perry dances underneath the fountain at night. The story treatment in the video is mostly taken from the film When in Rome, with the theme of magical coins thrown into a fountain. The video also references James Bond films, West Side Story and Baywatch.

== Awards and nominations ==
Awards and nominations for "Starstrukk"
Year	Organization	Award	Result	Ref(s)
2010	MuchMusic Video Awards	Best International Group Video	Nominated	

== Usage in media and cover versions ==
"Starstrukk" was featured on the third episode of the first season of The Vampire Diaries. It was also used in When in Rome. The song was covered by Marina and the Diamonds on BBC Radio 1's Live Lounge in the United Kingdom, and at a few of her live performances, including the Glastonbury Festival. A studio recording of her cover was included as the B-side to her 2010 single "Oh No!".

== Charts ==
=== Weekly charts ===
Weekly chart performance for "Starstrukk"
Chart (2009–2010)	Peak position
Australia (ARIA)	4
Australia Digital Songs (Billboard)	3
Austria (Ö3 Austria Top 40)	48
Belgium (Ultratop 50 Flanders)	21
Belgium (Ultratip Bubbling Under Wallonia)	2
Canada Hot 100 (Billboard)	31
Canada CHR/Top 40 (Billboard)	27
Canada Digital Songs (Billboard)	22
Czech Republic Airplay (ČNS IFPI)	19
Denmark (Tracklisten)	39
Euro Digital Song Sales (Billboard)	5
European Hot 100 Singles (Billboard)	19
Global Dance Songs (Billboard)	21
Ireland (IRMA)	4
Latvia (European Hit Radio)	1
Lithuania (European Hit Radio)	6
Netherlands (Dutch Tipparade 40)	2
Netherlands (Single Top 100)	65
New Zealand (Recorded Music NZ)	16
Scottish Singles Sales (Official Charts)	3
Slovakia Airplay (ČNS IFPI)	20
Sweden (Sverigetopplistan)	55
UK Singles (Official Charts)	3
UK Digital Songs (Billboard)	3
US Billboard Hot 100	66
US Digital Song Sales (Billboard)	51
US Pop Airplay (Billboard)	25

=== Year-end charts ===
2009 year-end chart performance for "Starstrukk"
Chart (2009)	Position
Australia (ARIA)	32
UK Singles (OCC)	152

2010 year-end chart performance for "Starstrukk"
Chart (2010)	Position
Australia (ARIA)	83
European Hot 100 Singles (Billboard)	68
Latvia (European Hit Radio)	27
Lithuania (European Hit Radio)	82
UK Singles (OCC)	29

== Certifications ==
Certifications for "Starstrukk"
Region	Certification	Certified units/sales
Australia (ARIA)	2× Platinum	140,000^{^}
Canada (Music Canada)	2× Platinum	160,000^{‡}
New Zealand (RMNZ)	Platinum	15,000^{*}
United Kingdom (BPI)	Platinum	600,000^{‡}
United States (RIAA)	2× Platinum	2,000,000^{‡}
^{*} Sales figures based on certification alone.^{^} Shipments figures based on certification alone.^{‡} Sales+streaming figures based on certification alone.

== Release history ==
Release dates and formats for "Starstrukk"
Region	Date	Format	Version	Label	Ref.
United States	August 4, 2009	Contemporary hit radio	Original	Photo Finish; Atlantic; RRP	
Various	September 8, 2009	Digital download	Remix featuring Katy Perry	Photo Finish	
