= Follow Me Down (3OH!3 song) =

Song by 3OH!3 featuring Neon Hitch

from the album Almost Alice
- Released: January 23, 2010
- Genre: Synth-pop
- Length: 3:23
- Label: Buena Vista
- Songwriters: Nathaniel Motte; Sean Foreman; Neon Hitch
- Producers: Nathaniel Motte; Matthew Beckley

"Follow Me Down" is a song by American duo 3OH!3 featuring English singer Neon Hitch from the album Almost Alice (2010). The song was made available for streaming on January 23, 2010, via MySpace.

== Background and composition ==
On January 12, 2010, it was announced that 3OH!3 would be a part of the Almost Alice soundtrack, recording the song "Follow Me Down" featuring Neon Hitch. The track was written by Nathaniel Motte, Sean Foreman and Neon Hitch, while production was handled by Motte and Matt Beckley. The song features synth-pop elements.

== Critical reception ==
Mike Diver of BBC described the song's chorus as "mindless – that it's practically a playground chant, designed to fit some variation on hopscotch or a hand-clap game practised by pigtailed pupils." Melinda Newman of HitFix called the track "sprightly" and "rhythmic." Gerhard Breda of Laboratório Pop called it "the true abyss" of the soundtrack, criticizing the track stating, "A mass of emo rock sound coated in pretension and followed by terrible pop recycled from the worst boy bands of the dawn of the 2000s."

== Personnel ==
Credits for "Follow Me Down" adapted from album's liner notes.

3OH!3

- Sean Foreman – composer, lyricist, vocals
- Nathaniel Motte – composer, lyricist, vocals

Additional musicians

- Neon Hitch – featured artist, vocals
- Matt Beckley – additional vocals

Production

- Nathaniel Motte – producer
- Matt Beckley – producer, mixing

== Charts ==
Chart performance for "Follow Me Down"
Chart (2010)	Peak position
Canada Hot 100 (Billboard)	36
South Korea International Singles (GAON)	176
US Billboard Hot 100	89
