= 3OH!3 =

American electronic music duo

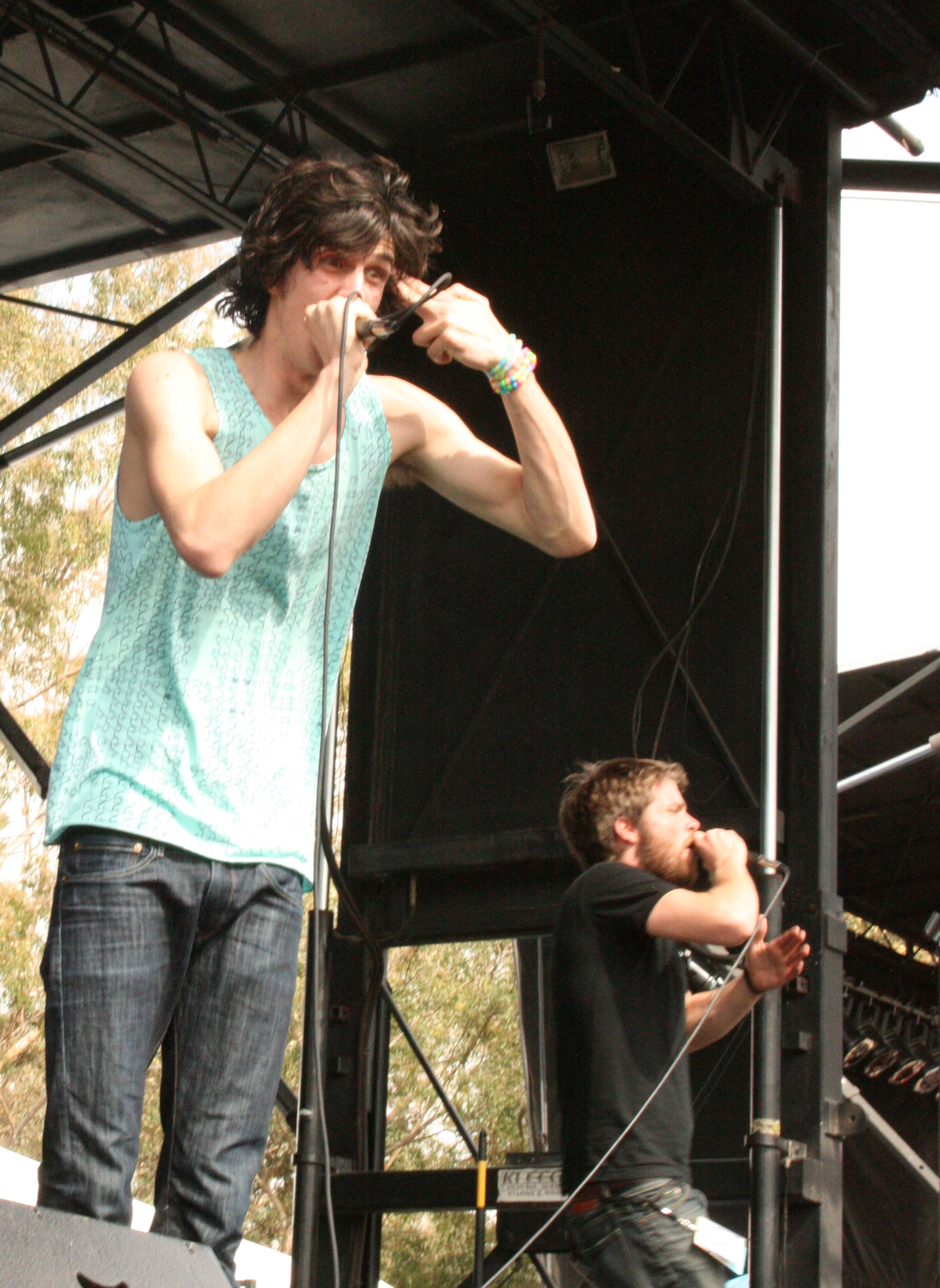
- Nathaniel Motte (left) and Sean Foreman (right) performing at Bamboozle in 2008

Background information
- Origin: Boulder, Colorado, U.S.
- Genres: Electropop; synth-pop; pop rap; trap; crunkcore; recession pop; alternative rock (early); electronic rock (early)
- Works: Discography
- Years active: 2004–present
- Labels: Fueled by Ramen; Photo Finish; Atlantic
- Members: Sean Foreman; Nathaniel Motte
- Website: 3oh3.com

3OH!3 (pronounced "three oh three") is an American electronic music duo from Boulder, Colorado, consisting of Sean Foreman and Nathaniel Motte. They are best known for their single "Don't Trust Me", which was the lead single from their second album Want as well as their breakthrough hit, reaching number seven on the Billboard Hot 100. Their second commercially successful single, a remix of the album's second single "Starstrukk" featuring Katy Perry, was a top ten hit in the United Kingdom, Ireland, Finland, Poland, and Australia. They gained further recognition by featuring Kesha on the song "My First Kiss", the lead single from their third album, Streets of Gold, which later peaked at number seven on the Billboard 200.

The band is associated with the scene subculture.

== History ==
=== 2004–2007: Formation and debut studio album ===
Sean Foreman (born August 27, 1985) and Nathaniel Motte (born January 13, 1984) formed the band in 2004, naming it after the 303 area code that had (at the time of their birth) encompassed the entire state of Colorado but lately covers only the Denver metropolitan area and Boulder. The two met while attending the University of Colorado, and they decided to form 3OH!3 after discovering similar musical interests. Prior to forming the band, Motte was DJing in the area at local hip-hop shows. Foreman was competing in MC battles and formed his first hip-hop group with Devin Scheffel.

The first track 3OH!3 created was "Say 'Dem Up" from their self-titled debut album. The duo released their debut single "Holler Til You Pass Out" on August 18, 2006, along with its music video. They released their self-titled debut album on July 2, 2007, as well as the second single "Electroshock" that same day. The duo recorded the album in their basement and was recorded through their "in-our-shower mixtape thing." The duo soon began garnering some success, opening for The Blackout Pact and the Faint, as well as headlining two shows at the Marquis. 3OH!3 then signed to Photo Finish Records, a division of Atlantic Records and planned to start recording their second album. After having some hit shows in Boulder, they moved to Denver for the larger venue and fan base.

=== 2008–2009: Want ===
3OH!3 spent four to five weeks recording their second studio album, working in the studio for 16 hours each day. Ahead of the album's release, the duo released its lead single "Don't Trust Me" on June 1, 2008. The song was met with commercial success, peaking at number seven on the US Billboard Hot 100, as well as topping the US Pop Airplay chart. The song was certified 5× Platinum by the Recording Industry Association of America. Want was officially released on July 8, 2008, reaching number 44 on the Billboard 200 and selling 10,000 copies which was their best sales week to date. The album was produced by the duo themselves and Matt Squire, as well as from Benny Blanco on a few tracks. The group contributed an original theme song titled "Sex on the Beach" for The Real World: Cancun. 3OH!3 also wrote an anthem for Major League Baseball's Colorado Rockies.

After playing in Denver during the Warped Tour 2007, 3OH!3 signed on for all venues of Warped Tour 2008. They also performed at local venues around Colorado such as the Fox Theatre in Boulder, Colorado and the Aggie Theater in Ft. Collins, Colorado in support of the album's release. The duo joined Katy Perry on a European tour in February 2009. The band performed in Panama City Beach, Florida, for MTVU's Spring Break in March 2009 and at The Mile High Music Festival at Dick's Sporting Goods Park along with other artists such as The Fray, Pepper, and Matisyahu. The band later co-headlined the 2009 Alternative Press Tour across the United States and were joined by The Maine and Family Force 5, with support from Hit the Lights and A Rocket to the Moon. They played at Kiss The Summer Hello 2009 at Coca-Cola Field in Buffalo, New York, June 3, 2009. 3OH!3 joined the Warped Tour once again in 2009. In summer 2009 they appeared at the Reading/Leeds festivals in the UK.

The duo was featured in a 14-page photo spread in Cliché Magazine's "Green Issue" in August 2009. They released their second single, "Starstrukk," on August 4, 2009. A remix of the song featuring Katy Perry was released digitally on September 8, 2009. The song peaked at number 66 on the Billboard Hot 100. It was a top ten hit in the United Kingdom, Australia, and Belgium. The song was certified 2× platinum by the RIAA. The duo was nominated for Best New Artist at the 2009 MTV Video Music Awards. They also performed at the award show on September 13. In August 2009, they released the EP Live Sessions on iTunes. The EP peaked at number 11 on the US Dance/Electronic Albums chart. "Still Around" was released as the third and final single and was sent for radio airplay on December 8, 2009. The duo were nominated at the mtvU Woodie Awards in December 2009, for the Performing Woodie award, but lost to Green Day. A new song, "Follow Me Down", was written for the compilation album for the film Alice in Wonderland with Neon Hitch. The pair also supported All Time Low, Boys Like Girls, Third Eye Blind, and LMFAO on The Bamboozle Roadshow 2010.

3OH!3 was featured on the track "Hey" by Lil Jon on his album, Crunk Rock in 2010. They were also featured on the Kesha song "Blah Blah Blah", which peaked at number seven on the Billboard Hot 100. They appeared on American Idol to perform the song with Kesha. On February 5, 2010, it was announced that Cobra Starship and 3OH!3 would be embarking on a co-headlining tour called The Too Fast for Love Tour featuring labelmates I Fight Dragons. The two-month tour covered more than 25 cities, including a date in their home state of Colorado. The album was certified platinum by the RIAA on July 13, 2023, fifteen years after its initial release.

=== 2009–2010: Streets of Gold ===
After spending the last two years touring in support of their second album, the duo headed to Breckenridge, Colorado for a two-week retreat, writing songs for their third studio album. Within ten days, the duo had written 15 songs and flew out to Los Angeles to record the album at The Lair Recording Studio, working with producers Matt Squire Benny Blanco, Dr. Luke and Greg Kurstin. In April 2010, the duo released "House Party" as a buzz single from the album. The album's first single, "My First Kiss" was released on May 4, 2010, and features Kesha. The song debuted at number nine on the Billboard Hot 100 and was certified gold by the RIAA. From May to June 2010, the group released a handful of songs for streaming in promotion their third album, "Touchin' on My", "Déjà Vu", "Double Vision" and "I Can Do Anything". "Double Vision" was released as the album's second single on June 15, 2010, and peaked at number 87 on the Billboard Hot 100. Streets of Gold was released on June 29, 2010. The album debuted at number seven on the Billboard 200, selling 41,000 copies in its first week. They embarked on the Streets of Gold tour in the summer of 2010, with support from Hellogoodbye and Down with Webster. They also toured across Europe, Australia and Japan in August 2010. They were nominated at the 2010 MTV Video Music Awards for Best Collaboration.

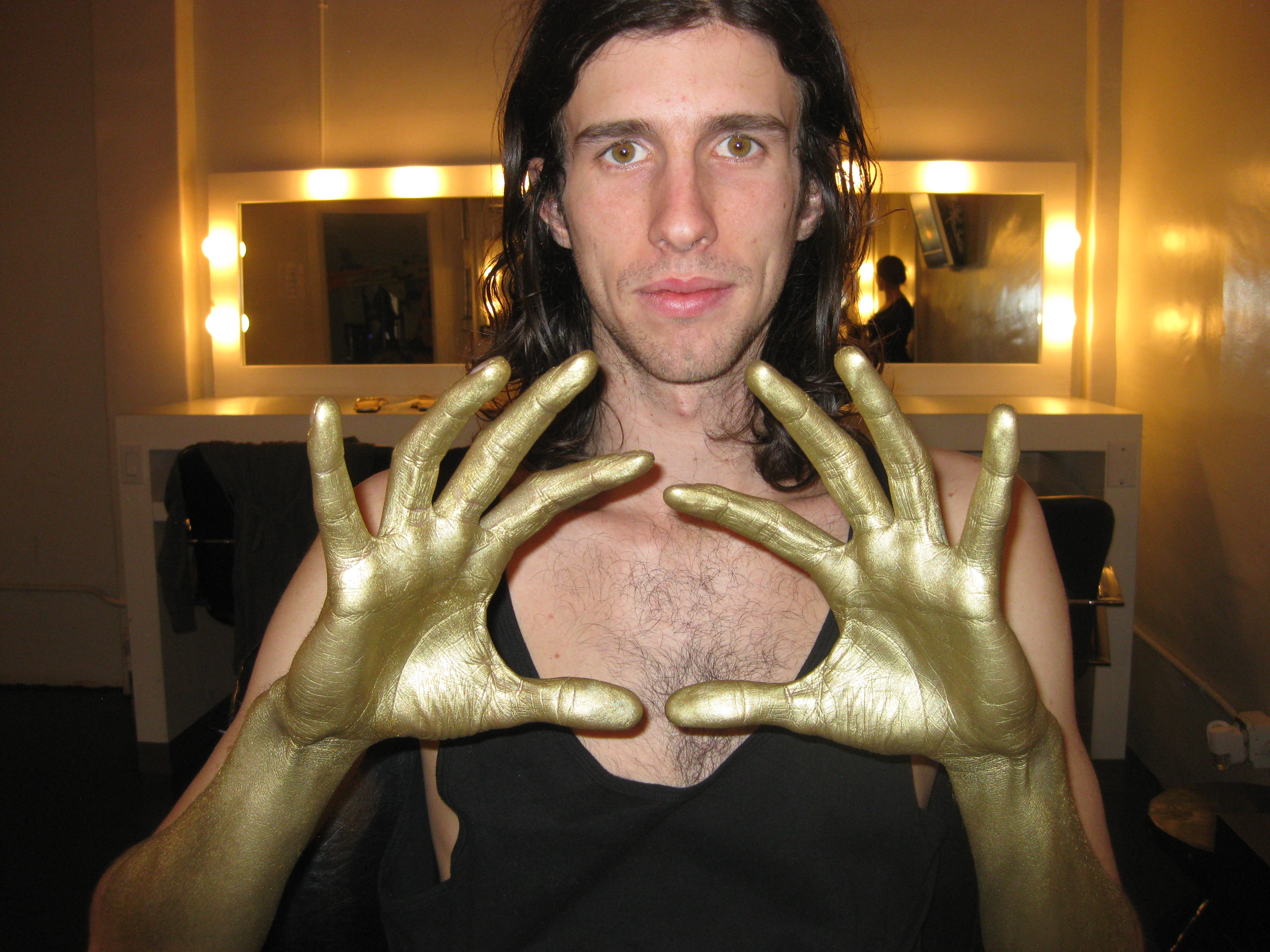
3OH!3's original "hand gesture" logo that resulted in litigation from professional wrestler Diamond Dallas Page

On August 31, 2010, retired professional wrestler Diamond Dallas Page filed a lawsuit against 3OH!3 for copyright infringement of his trademarked "Diamond Cutter" hand gesture. Page previously filed a similar lawsuit against rapper Jay-Z in 2005, which resulted in Page dropping the lawsuit for an undisclosed amount of money.

3OH!3 released the single "Hit It Again" onto iTunes on December 21, 2010. The song "I Know How to Say" was used in a trailer for the 2011 animated Disney film Mars Needs Moms as well as being featured in commercials for the sci-fi comedy movie Paul, which was also released in 2011. 3OH!3 appeared on the CW series Hellcats, performing their hit single "My First Kiss", with Ashley Tisdale performing Kesha's parts. On January 20, 2011, their video for the third single "Touchin' on My" from their album was released. The song peaked at number 49 on the Billboard Hot 100.

=== 2011–2013: Omens ===
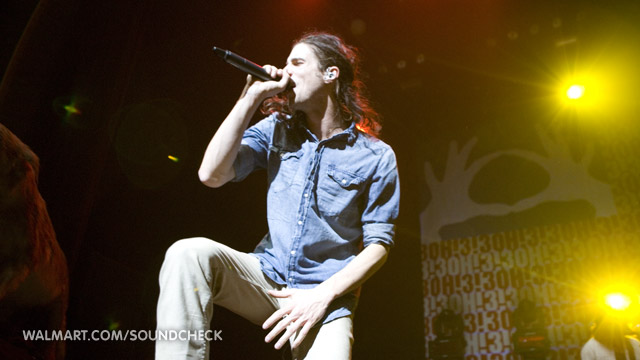
Motte performing in June 2010

On February 20, 2011, Nathaniel Motte released a statement that they were working on a fourth studio album. The duo released a new single "Robot" on June 28, via iTunes. Cliché Magazine interviewed the duo on future plans and talked of the fourth studio album and the fan submissions for the then-upcoming "Robot" video. The duo performed at the 2011 Vans Warped Tour. On December 13, 2011, 3OH!3 released the first of three previously unreleased songs, "Bang Bang" on iTunes. "Dirty Mind" followed a week later on December 20, and the last, "Set You Free" was released on December 27. The latter became the most successful of the three, peaking at number 84 on the Billboard Hot 100. On March 2, 2012, the duo released the EP SHT: From the Vault on iTunes.

In May 2012, "Do or Die" was released for streaming which appeared on the duo's fourth studio album. On June 22, 2012, Motte announced via Twitter the title of the album to be Omens. On July 9, 2012, Foreman announced the release of the first official single from the album, "You're Gonna Love This", which was released the following day. They embarked on a fall tour from August to October 2012, and were joined by Sammy Adams, Outasight and Silas. The album was originally supposed to be released on October 30, 2012, however, Motte revealed a new release date for the album on Twitter with a release set for December 4. On November 13, the duo released the album's second single, "Youngblood". On December 1, Motte announced that the album would be delayed with no timetable for a release. He also announced that 3OH!3 were back in the studio making new songs. On December 18, the single "Do or Die" was released to iTunes. The third single from the album, entitled "Back to Life", was made available to stream on 3OH!3's website on March 3, 2013, and was made available for download on March 5. After months of delays, the duo released Omens on June 18, 2013. Produced by the duo, the album was recorded in their basement studio in Boulder, Colorado, writing out 28 songs. The album peaked at number 81 on the Billboard 200.

The duo performed at Warped Tour in 2013 from June to August. They also headlined the Journeys Noise Tour from October to November 2013, and were joined by The Summer Set, Wallpaper. and New Beat Fund. They premiered the song "Turn the Night On" via Alternative Press on October 15, 2013. The duo performed at Warped Tour in June 2014, and Riot Festival in September 2014. The band collaborated with Blues Traveler on the song "Blow Up the Moon" from their album of the same name.

=== 2015–2019: Night Sports ===
On August 6, 2014, 3OH!3 released a statement that they are working on a fifth studio album. By August 2015, the duo had written over 40 songs for the album. On December 4, 2015, 3OH!3 released the lead single from their fifth album, My Dick. The band signed to Fueled By Ramen in 2016. On March 3, 2016, 3OH!3 revealed the title of the upcoming album, Night Sports. They also announced another single, "Mad At You," which was released in a music video the same day. A music video for "BASMF" was released on March 17, 2016. The fourth single from Night Sports, "Hear Me Now," was released on April 14, 2016. The song was used on the soundtrack of Madden NFL17. Night Sports was released on May 13, 2016. The album peaked at number 170 on the Billboard 200. In support of the album's release, the band performed at the 2016 Vans Warped Tour. On July 27, 2016, a music video for "Freak Your Mind" was released as the fifth and final single.

In 2017, the band played Warped Rewind at Sea, a 4-day cruise that included Simple Plan, Good Charlotte, and many others. While on board, they hosted a songwriting workshop where the band and around 50 people co-wrote a song called Sauce Daddy. Sauce Daddy was first performed live at their DJ set the next night.

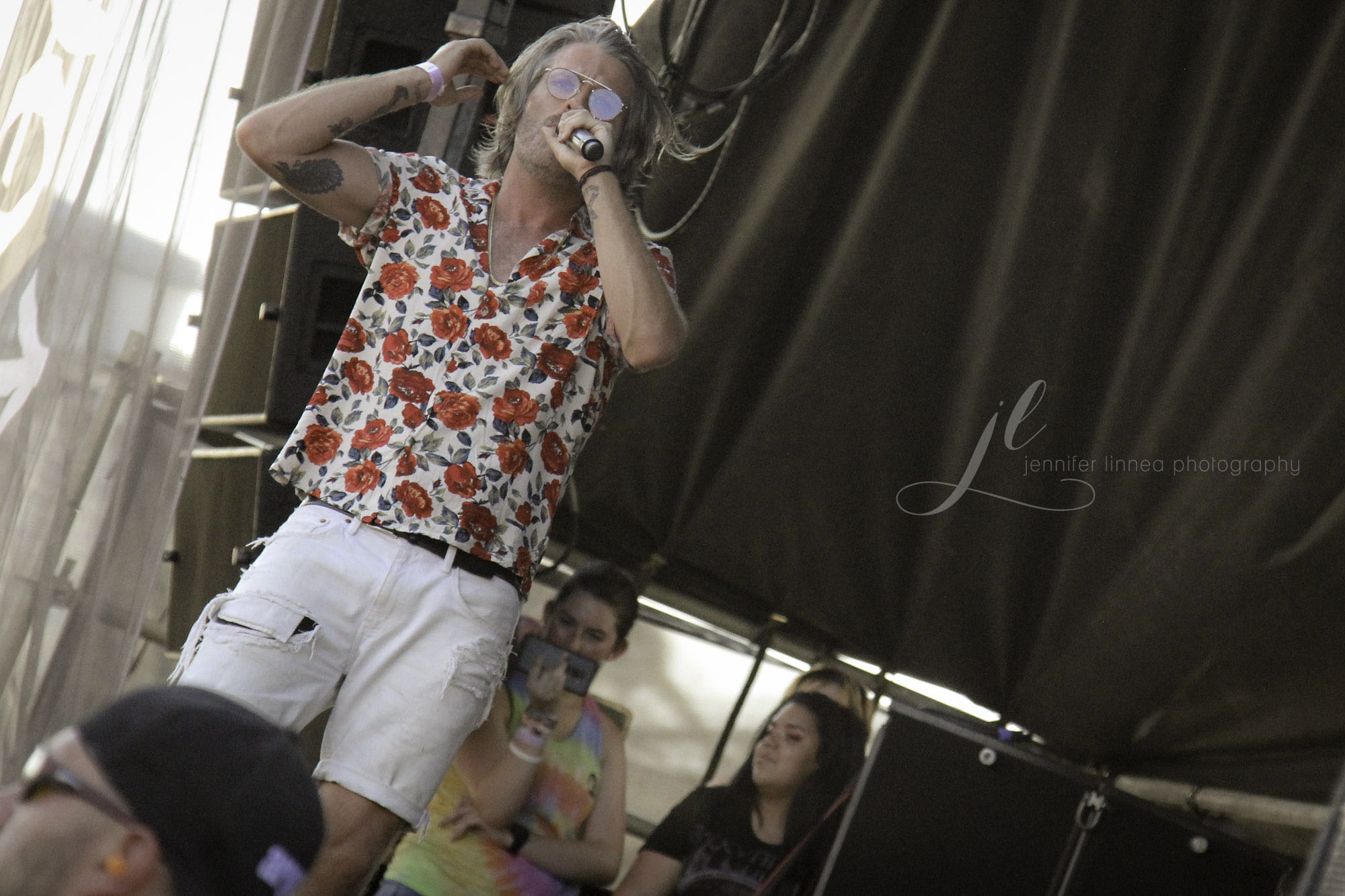
Foreman performing in July 2018

3OH!3 did a surprise performance at Emo Nite LA in March 2018. The band performed on all dates of the final run of the Vans Warped Tour which ran from June to August 2018. On October 4, 2018, it was announced that the band would embark on a tour with Emo Nite and Lil Aaron commemorating the 10th anniversary of WANT throughout the end of 2018.

=== 2020–present: Need ===
During the fall of 2019, the duo teased new music on Instagram, and in November announced a 2020 concert for March 3, also known as 303 Day, at the Mission Ballroom in Denver, Colorado. Denver based bands VYNYL and Breathe Carolina, as well as Lil Jon were the openers. After four years since releasing any new music, on November 13, 2020, the band released a new song called "Lonely Machines" with duo 100 gecs, which Wall of Sound described as a "cheeky, fun EDM anthem, taking you back to when "Don't Trust Me" was all over the radio." During those four years, Motte and Foreman spent time writing and producing for other artists. The duo later announced that an album would soon follow. They returned to Boulder, Colorado, and wrote and recorded the album prior to the COVID-19 pandemic. They also re-signed with Photo Finish Records that year. On January 22, 2021, the duo released another single titled "I'm So Sad". In February 2021, the duo were featured on Rebecca Black's "Friday (Remix)" version. On March 3, 2021, the duo released the single "Last Breath", featuring Slipknot's CLOWN on drums. That same month, the duo performed at their 303 Day celebration in Denver. A fourth single for the upcoming album, "Vampire's Diet" was released on June 25, 2021, and features Bert McCracken of The Used. The group's sixth studio album titled Need (echoing the title of their 2008 breakthrough album Want) was released on August 27, 2021, through Photo Finish Records.

In January 2022, the duo joined The Maine on their 8123 Festival, alongside Beach Weather, Mayday Parade, The Summer Set and Tessa Violet. In October 2022, they performed at the When We Were Young Festival. The duo performed at the same event two years later. They performed at Emo Nite on December 8, 2024, alongside Cobra Starship and Saosin, among many more. They performed at the New Year's Eve party at Fremont Street Experience in Las Vegas, and headlined the 303 Day celebration in February and March 2025.

On July 25, 2025, they released the single "Slushie".

The band are confirmed to be making an appearance at Welcome to Rockville, which will take place in Daytona Beach, Florida in May 2026.

== Touring members ==
- Kamtin Mohager – bass guitar (2007–10)
- Adam Halferty – drums (2009–10)
- Isom Innis – keyboards (2010)
- Jesse Cronan – keyboards (2012)
- Marshall Gallagher – guitars (2012)
- Jared Piccone – drums (2012)
- Jess Bowen - drums (2018 — present)

== Discography ==
- 3OH!3 (2007)
- Want (2008)
- Streets of Gold (2010)
- Omens (2013)
- Night Sports (2016)
- Need (2021)

== Filmography ==
| Year | Program |
|---|---|
| 2009 | MTVU Spring Break |
| 2009 | MTV Video Music Awards |
| 2010 | Hellcats |
| 2010 | The Tonight Show with Jay Leno |
| 2010 | American Idol |
| 2011 | Silent Library |
| 2018 | Family Feud |

== Awards and nominations ==
| Year | Association | Category | Nominated work | Result | Ref. |
|---|---|---|---|---|---|
| 2009 | MTV Video Music Awards | Best New Artist | "Don't Trust Me" | Nominated | |
| 2009 | mtvU Woodie Awards | Performing Woodie | 3OH!3 | Nominated | |
| 2010 | BMI Awards | BMI Pop Songs Award | "Don't Trust Me" | Won | |
| 2010 | MuchMusic Video Awards | Best International Group Video | "Starstrukk" | Nominated | |
| 2010 | MTV Video Music Awards | Best Collaboration | "My First Kiss" | Nominated | |
