= 3OH!3 (album) =

Studio album by 3OH!3
- Released: July 2, 2007
- Genre: Crunkcore; alternative rock; synth-pop; electronic rock
- Length: 32:12
- Label: Self-released

3OH!3 chronology
3OH!3 (2007)	Want (2008)

Singles from 3OH!3
- 1. "Holler Til You Pass Out" Released: August 18, 2006; 2. "Electroshock" Released: July 2, 2007

3OH!3 is the debut studio album by American electronic music band 3OH!3. It was released independently on July 2, 2007. The duo re-released the album via iTunes which "Holler Til You Pass Out", "Chokechain", and "Dance with Me" were excluded from the release of the album.

== Background and release ==
On August 18, 2006, the duo released the album's lead single, "Holler Til You Pass Out" along with its music video, directed by Isaac Ravishankara. "Electroshock" was released as the second single on July 2, 2007, the same day as the album's release. The music video for the song was released and was also directed by Isaac Ravishankara. The album includes the music video for "Holler Til You Pass Out" and a video performance when the group travelled to California at The Beauty Bar, The Echo and Cinespace, and at their home state Colorado at the Gothic Theatre. The album artwork was done by Nick Motte and photography by Shannon Axelson. The tracks "Holler Til You Pass Out" and "Chokechain" were later remixed and re-recorded for the band's second studio album, Want.

== Composition ==
During the creation of their self-titled album, Nathaniel Motte was the beatmaker, while Sean Foreman primarily focused on vocals and lyrics. "Holler Til You Pass Out" and "Chokechain" were described as rap rock tracks, while "I'm Not Coming to Your Party" and "Neatfreak 47" drew comparison to LCD Soundsystem. They recorded the album in their basement and was recorded through their "in-our-shower mixtape thing."

== Track listing ==
Original version
No.	Title	Length
1.	"Holler Til You Pass Out"	3:34
2.	"Electroshock"	3:01
3.	"Chokechain"	3:26
4.	"Neatfreak 47"	2:09
5.	"Dance with Me"	2:17
6.	"Don't Dance"	3:17
7.	"Say'dem Up"	3:07
8.	"Dragon Backpack"	2:09
9.	"Hott"	3:03
10.	"I'm Not Comin' to Your Party Girl"	2:44
11.	"Hornz"	3:25
Total length:		32:12

Videos
No.	Title	Length
1.	"Holler.mov"	5:01
2.	"Live.mov"	14:00

Re-release edition
No.	Title	Length
1.	"Electroshock"	3:01
2.	"Neatfreak 47"	2:09
3.	"Don't Dance"	3:17
4.	"Say'dem Up"	3:07
5.	"Dragon Backpack"	2:09
6.	"Hott"	3:03
7.	"I'm Not Comin' to Your Party Girl"	2:44
8.	"Hornz"	3:25
Total length:		22:35

== Release history ==
Release history and formats for 3OH!3
Region	Date	Format	Versions	Label	Ref.
United States	July 2, 2007	CD	Standard	Self-released	
Various	July 23, 2007	Digital download	iTunes re-release	Self-released	
Various	July 28, 2007	Digital download	Standard	Self-released	
