= Hey (Lil Jon song) =

Single by Lil Jon featuring 3OH!3

from the album Crunk Rock
- Released: June 15, 2010
- Recorded: 2009–2010
- Genre: Dance-pop; pop rap; crunkcore
- Length: 3:35
- Label: BME; Universal Republic
- Songwriters: Jonathan Smith; Sean Foreman; Nathaniel Motte; Lukasz Gottwald; Benjamin Levin; Allan Grigg; William Holmes
- Producers: Dr. Luke; Benny Blanco; Kool Kojak

Lil Jon singles chronology
"Ms. Chocolate" (2010)	"Hey" (2010)	"Machuka" (2010)

3OH!3 singles chronology
"Double Vision" (2010)	"Hey" (2010)	"Hit It Again" (2010)

"Hey" is a song by American rapper Lil Jon featuring 3OH!3. It was released as the second single from his debut solo album, Crunk Rock. It was also featured on the Jersey Shore soundtrack.

== Critical reception ==
Dave Herrera of Westword stated, "As it stands, it's a nice enough electro track. Regardless, gotta hand it to the dudes. They sure know how to write a hook. And if this record resonates like we think it will, 3OH!3 will walking on Streets of Gold in no time."

== Music video ==
The video was filmed in Hollywood and directed by David Rousseau. It was released on August 26, 2010. The video revolves around a girls-only pool party, featuring the Jersey Shore cast with track artists Lil Jon and 3OH!3. Bandmember Nathaniel Motte explained: "The concept of the 'Hey' video is assemble the largest amount of hot chicks you can and throw a pool party … which is kinda crazy because we're never invited to those kind of parties."

== Chart performance ==
"Hey" debuted at number 70 on the Billboard Hot 100 upon the release of the album and moved up to number 62 the next week, before falling off the Hot 100. It also debuted at number 46 on the Hot Digital Songs chart and reached number 33 in its second week.

== Charts ==
=== Weekly charts ===
Weekly chart performance for "Hey"
Chart (2010)	Peak position
Canada Hot 100 (Billboard)	48
South Korea International Singles (GAON)	37
US Billboard Hot 100	62
US Digital Song Sales (Billboard)	33

=== Year-end charts ===
Year-end chart performance for "Hey"
Chart (2010)	Position
South Korea International Singles (Gaon)	85
