= Streets of Gold =

Studio album by 3OH!3
- Released: June 29, 2010
- Recorded: 2008–2010
- Studios: The Lair Recording Studio (Los Angeles, California)
- Genres: Electropop; electronic rock
- Length: 44:16
- Labels: Photo Finish; Atlantic
- Producers: Matt Squire; Benny Blanco; Dr. Luke; Greg Kurstin; 3OH!3

3OH!3 chronology
Want (2008)	Streets of Gold (2010)	Omens (2013)

Singles from Streets of Gold
- 1. "My First Kiss" Released: May 4, 2010; 2. "Double Vision" Released: June 15, 2010; 3. "Touchin' on My" Released: January 20, 2011

Streets of Gold is the third studio album by American electronic music duo 3OH!3. It was released on June 29, 2010 in the United States and July 19, 2010 in the United Kingdom. The album debuted at number seven on the US Billboard 200, selling 41,000 copies in its first week. Upon its release, Streets of Gold received generally mixed reviews from most music critics.

The album was preceded by its lead single "My First Kiss", featuring Kesha, released on May 4, 2010. The song was a commercial success, peaking at number nine on the Billboard Hot 100 and was certified Gold by the Recording Industry Association of America. The album's second single, "Double Vision" was released two weeks before the album, on June 15. Its third single "Touchin' on My" was released on January 20, 2011. In New Zealand, the album was certified Gold by the Recorded Music NZ.

== Background ==
Streets of Gold is described as "perversions on the pop standard," according to Sean Foreman. Nathaniel Motte stated that the duo wanted to "push boundaries with this album," experimenting with different styles and avoiding to create songs that sound the same. He also told Rolling Stone that the goal for the album was to "make smash hits," following the success of their previous album, Want. The album was inspired by gold and writing about their "life on the road," as well as party anthems. Foreman felt that Streets of Gold was a lot more diverse than their last album. The album's sound was influenced by Buck 65 and Joanna Newsom. The title of album "just felt right and big and epic and happy," Motte explained.

== Composition and recording ==
The duo settled in Breckenridge, Colorado for a two week retreat to write songs for Streets of Gold. After ten days, the duo had written 15 songs and flew out to Los Angeles to record the album at The Lair Recording Studio. They worked with producers Matt Squire Benny Blanco, Dr. Luke, and Greg Kurstin. By February 2010, they recorded 25 potential tracks for the album. Motte described the album's sound as something they've "been honing for a couple of years." He also revealed that while in the studio, the duo "learned so much as songwriters and as producers," which added a "more developed and more defined album."

== Release ==
On April 5, 2010, the song "House Party" was leaked onto the internet for digital download. 3OH!3 released a video for the song "House Party" on April 9 as a buzz single for Streets of Gold. After meeting Andrew W.K. at a house party in Memphis, Tennessee, they decided to do a rock remix of "House Party" with Andrew W.K., which was released on April 16. The album artwork and release date were later revealed that month. First single, "My First Kiss" featuring Kesha, was released on their website on May 3 and digitally on May 4. On May 18, 2010, the song "Touchin' on My" was released exclusively on iTunes Store. 3OH!3 planned to release a new song every other Tuesday up to the release of the album. "Déjà Vu" was released on June 1, and "Double Vision" was released on June 15. The latter was released as the album's second single. On June 8, the song "I Can Do Anything" was released to members only on the 3OH!3 website. The song "I Know How To Say" was used in a trailer for the animated Disney film Mars Needs Moms. An excerpt from the instrumental version of the song can be heard on the official Mars Needs Moms website. Streets of Gold was streamed on the duo's MySpace page, before it was officially released the following day. It was released in the UK on July 19. In support of the album's release, the duo embarked on the Too Fast For Love Tour with Cobra Starship and Travie McCoy. They also toured across Europe, Australia and Japan in August 2010. A music video for "Touchin' on My" was released on January 20, 2011, which serves as the album's third single.

== Critical reception ==
Professional ratings
Aggregate scores
Source	Rating
Metacritic	48/100
Review scores
Source	Rating
AllMusic	3/5 stars
Alternative Press	4/5 stars
BBC Online	(mixed)
Billboard	4/5 stars
Entertainment Weekly	(C+)
MusicOMH	2/5 stars
The New York Times	(favorable)
NME	(0/10)
Rolling Stone	1/5 stars
Spin	(2/10)
The Washington Post	(favorable)

The album received mixed reviews from most music critics. At Metacritic, which assigns a normalized rating out of 100 to reviews from mainstream critics, the album has received an average score of 48, based on 11 reviews, which indicates "generally mixed or average reviews". AllMusic writer David Jeffries noted "over-the-top performances" and stated "3OH!3 are nothing if not loud and shameless, so if you expect end-to-end excellence from their albums, you’ve got a lot to learn about cheap thrills". Entertainment Weekly's Leah Greenblatt gave the album a C+ rating and wrote that "Streets of Gold's beats still sound garage-sale-Casio cheap, but the album yields several doofy, affable sing-alongs". Jon Caramanica of The New York Times complimented its incorporation of hip hop, rock, and electro-pop styles and described it as "an oppressive and convincing wall of sounds". Alternative Press gave the album 4 out of 5 stars and wrote that it "sweeps across a broad range of stylistic tones, maintaining levity while dabbling in comparably serious musical pursuits". Billboard stated, "Following the release of its much buzzed-about 2008 breakout album, Want, electro-rap duo 3OH!3 returns with more fast-paced, catchy digital-pop beats on its latest set, Streets of Gold." The Washington Post's Sean Fennessey called 3OH!3 "cheeky stylists with quips that frequently devolve into misogyny" and noted "little depth", but concluded "Still, this is a group that excels when no one is listening to what they're saying, only to how they sound, which is always committed and fearlessly grand".

In contrast, BBC Online's Fraser McAlpine panned the album's lyrics and called it "dumb for sure, but no fun whatsoever". Ben Weisz of MusicOMH gave it 2 out of 5 stars and stated "the lyrics are generally unimaginative, sacrificing any shred of credibility to chase the cheap rhyme". Stacey Anderson of Spin criticized the songs' "witticisms" and noted "brutish synths and hammy bleats". Giving it 1 out of 5 stars, Jody Rosen of Rolling Stone called it "grim stuff – a soundtrack for beer-pong tournaments" and panned its formula of "dopey electro rock bolstering 'raps' about drinking... and getting girls to 'touch on' their privates". NME's Mark Beaumont gave the album a 0/10 rating and called 3OH!3 "electro-hip-pop white bread American scum", stating "If Streets Of Gold's lyrics are unlikely to bother the Nobel committee, musically 3OH!3 are a boyband pendulum: the threat of the latter tamed and glossed by the cash-hungry urge to be the former".

== Commercial performance ==
Streets of Gold was projected to sell 30,000 to 40,000 copies and land in the top ten on the Billboard 200. The album debuted at number seven on the Billboard 200 with 41,000 copies sold in its first week. It also topped US Top Dance Albums and remained on the chart for 50 weeks. On the UK Albums Chart, the album peaked at number 19. It reached number 12 on the Scottish Albums Chart. The album has sold more than 100,000 copies in US. In New Zealand, it was certified Gold by the Recorded Music NZ in August 2026, denoting sales of 7,500 units.

== Track listing ==
Standard Edition
No.	Title	Writer(s)	Producer(s)	Length
1.	"Beaumont"	Sean Foreman; Nathaniel Motte	Matt Squire; 3OH!3	1:08
2.	"I Can Do Anything"	Foreman; Motte	Squire; 3OH!3	3:10
3.	"My First Kiss" (featuring Kesha)	Lukasz Gottwald; Benjamin Levin; Foreman; Motte	Dr. Luke; Benny Blanco; 3OH!3	3:12
4.	"Déjà vu"	Foreman; Motte; Greg Kurstin	Kurstin; 3OH!3	3:04
5.	"We Are Young"	Foreman; Motte	Squire; 3OH!3	3:20
6.	"Touchin' on My"	Foreman; Motte	Squire; 3OH!3	3:02
7.	"House Party"	Foreman; Motte	Squire; 3OH!3	3:06
8.	"R.I.P."	Foreman; Motte	Squire; 3OH!3	3:44
9.	"I Know How to Say"	Foreman; Motte; Kurstin	Kurstin; 3OH!3	3:14
10.	"Double Vision"	Squire; Levin; Foreman; Motte	Blanco; Squire; 3OH!3	3:10
11.	"I'm Not the One"	Foreman; Motte; Kurstin	Kurstin; 3OH!3	4:10
12.	"Streets of Gold"	Gottwald; Levin; Foreman; Motte	Dr. Luke; Blanco; 3OH!3	3:12
13.	"See You Go"	Foreman; Motte	Squire; 3OH!3	2:48
14.	"Love 2012"	Foreman; Motte	Squire; 3OH!3	3:56

iTunes Bonus Tracks
No.	Title	Writer(s)	Producer(s)	Length
15.	"My First Kiss" (Innerpartysystem Remix) (featuring Kesha)	Gottwald; Levin; Foreman; Motte	Dr. Luke; Blanco; 3OH!3	5:08
16.	"House Party" (Andrew W.K. Remix)	Foreman; Motte	Squire; 3OH!3	2:58

International Bonus Tracks
No.	Title	Writer(s)	Producer(s)	Length
15.	"Don't Trust Me"	Levin; Foreman; Motte	Blanco; 3OH!3	3:14
16.	"Starstrukk" (featuring Katy Perry)	Foreman; Motte	Squire; 3OH!3	3:23

== Personnel ==
Credits for Streets of Gold adapted from AllMusic.

=== Musicians ===
3OH!3

- Nathaniel Motte – vocals, composer, drums, keyboards, programming
- Sean Foreman – vocals, composer

Guest musicians

- Kesha – vocals on track 3
- Katy Perry – vocals on track 16

=== Production ===
- Benny Blanco – drums, keyboards, programming, vocals, backing vocals, producer, engineer, musician
- Joseph Cultice – photography
- Megan Dennis – production coordination
- Dr. Luke – programming, vocals, producer, musician
- Chris Gehringer – material
- Serban Ghenea – mixing
- Larry Goetz – assistant
- Aniela Gottwald – assistant
- Tatiana Gottwald – assistant
- John Hanes – mixing
- Sam Holland – engineer

- Jimmy James – production assistant
- Andrew Kimmell – artwork
- Greg Kurstin – guitars, keyboards, programming, producer, engineer, mixing
- Jeremy "J Boogs" Levin – assistant
- Nicholas Motte – artwork
- Michelle Piza – packaging manager
- Irene Richter – production coordination
- Tim Roberts – mixing assistant
- Vanessa Silberman – production coordination
- Matt Squire – guitar, drums, keyboards, programming, producer, engineer, mixing, vocal editing
- Steve Tippeconic – tambourine, assistant
- Emily Wright – engineer, vocal editing

== Charts ==
=== Weekly charts ===
Chart (2010)	Peak position
Australian Albums (ARIA)	75
Canadian Albums (Billboard)	10
Irish Albums (IRMA)	79
Japan Top Album Sales (Billboard Japan)	88
Scottish Albums (Official Charts)	12
UK Albums (Official Charts)	19
US Billboard 200	7
US Top Dance Albums (Billboard)	1

=== Year-end charts ===
Chart (2010)	Position
Canadian Albums (Nielsen)	142
US Top Dance/Electronic Albums (Billboard)	7
Chart (2011)	Position
US Top Dance/Electronic Albums (Billboard)	23

== Certifications ==
Region	Certification	Certified units/sales
New Zealand (RMNZ)	Gold	7,500^{‡}
^{‡} Sales+streaming figures based on certification alone.
