= Night Sports =

Studio album by 3OH!3
- Released: May 13, 2016
- Genre: Electropop; trap; hip hop; crunkcore
- Length: 37:58
- Label: Fueled By Ramen; Atlantic; Photo Finish
- Producer: 3OH!3

3OH!3 chronology
Omens (2013)	Night Sports (2016)	Need (2021)

Singles from Night Sports
- 1. "My Dick" Released: December 4, 2015; 2. "Mad at You" Released: March 4, 2016; 3. "BASMF" Released: March 18, 2016; 4. "Hear Me Now" Released: April 15, 2016; 5. "Freak Your Mind" Released: May 6, 2016

Night Sports is the fifth studio album by American electronic music duo 3OH!3. The album is their only album released under Fueled By Ramen, where the band signed in February 2016. The album was released on May 13, 2016.

== Background ==
On August 6, 2014, 3OH!3 began working on their fifth studio album. By August 2015, the duo had written over 40 songs for the album. In February 2016, they signed to Fueled By Ramen. On March 3, 2016, 3OH!3 announced the album's title, Night Sports. The album was produced, engineered and mixed by Nathaniel Motte. According to Motte, they avoided having outside influences and replenish it with "self-imposed" influences. The album was recorded in their basement studio in Boulder, Colorado. In support of the album's release, the band performed at the 2016 Vans Warped Tour.

== Singles ==
The first single released from the album was "My Dick", which was surprise released on December 4, 2015. The music video for the single was premiered on the same day, and it was directed by Tony Yacenda. "Mad at You" was released on March 4, 2016, alongside the pre-order for the album. The music video, directed by Isaac Ravishankara, was released the same day. On March 17, 3OH!3 announced a remix contest for the song where the winner would have their remix reposted on Fueled by Ramen's SoundCloud account, shared on the band's Facebook and Twitter accounts, as well as it being uploaded to the band's YouTube channel. The contest ended on April 20, with Wagner Koop being announced as the winner. "BASMF" was released as single on March 18, 2016. The music video was released the same day. "Hear Me Now", which was released on April 15, 2016. The music video for the song was released on May 12, 2016. The fifth and final single for the album was "Freak Your Mind", which was released on May 6. The music video was released on July 27.

== Critical reception ==
Professional ratings
Review scores
Source	Rating
AllMusic	3/5 stars
Renowned for Sound	0.5/5 stars
Sound Fiction	4/5 stars

The album was met with mixed to positive reviews from music critics. David Jeffries of AllMusic stated, "it's the usual cheap thrills, filth, and sick -- but sometimes slick -- jokes, so enjoy, and don't dare catch yourself in the mirror while doing it." Christopher Bohlsen of Renowned for Sound called the album "utterly offensive," criticizing the misogynistic lyrics on tracks such as "My Dick" and "Freak Your Mind". He overall remarked, "Outside of the occasional catchy chorus (in spite of the lyrics within), there's little of redeeming value in Night Sports. It plumbs the depths of pop and rap, drawing out the least subtle, most overbearing components from both, and mixing it with a healthy dose of misogyny and schoolboy humour." Sound Fiction said of the album, "Night Sports is the exact return to form the duo needed and the fans ultimately wanted."

== Track listing ==
Standard edition
No.	Title	Writer(s)	Length
1.	"Fire in the Heavens"	3OH!3	2:22
2.	"Hear Me Now"	3OH!3; Khris Lorenz; Marshall Gallagher	3:22
3.	"Mad at You"	3OH!3; Danny Mercer	3:23
4.	"Freak Your Mind"	3OH!3	3:48
5.	"Give Me Something to Remember"	3OH!3	3:38
6.	"7-11"	3OH!3	3:18
7.	"BASMF"	3OH!3	2:55
8.	"My Dick"	3OH!3; Gallagher; Rami Jrade; Lorenz; Kamtin Mohager; Liam O'Donnell	3:23
9.	"Inside Boy (Yep)"	3OH!3	3:07
10.	"Claustrophobia"	3OH!3	3:26
11.	"Hologram"	3OH!3	5:16
Total length:			37:58

== Personnel ==
Credits for Night Sports adapted from AllMusic.

3OH!3

- Sean Foreman – composer, engineering, instrumentation, mixing, photography, producer, programming, vocals
- Nathaniel Motte – composer, engineering, instrumentation, mixing, photography, producer, programming, vocals

Additional musicians

- Khris Lorenz – ukulele
- Liam O'Donnell – vocals
- Marshall Gallagher – vocals

Production

- Andrew Kimmell – artwork
- Anne Declemente – A&R
- Chris Gehringer – mastering
- Evan Lipschutz – A&R
- Greg Burke – artwork
- James Lawrenson – photography
- Jimmy Fontaine – photography
- Katie Baloian – photography
- Nicholas Motte – artwork, photography
- Tuyet Nguyen – photography
- Warren Motte – photography

== Charts ==
Chart (2016)	Peak position
US Billboard 200	170
US Top Dance Albums (Billboard)	2
