= Don't Trust Me =

2008 single by 3OH!3

Single by 3OH!3

from the album Want
- Released: June 1, 2008
- Recorded: 2008
- Genre: Electronic rock; alternative rock; electropop; pop rock
- Length: 3:13
- Label: Photo Finish
- Songwriters: Sean Foreman; Nathaniel Motte; Benjamin Levin
- Producers: Matt Squire; 3OH!3; Benny Blanco

3OH!3 singles chronology
| "Electroshock" (2007) | "Don't Trust Me" (2008) | "Starstrukk" (2009) |

Music video
- "Don't Trust Me" on YouTube

"Don't Trust Me" (sometimes written as "DONTTRUSTME"), is a song by the band 3OH!3. It was released as the lead single from their second album Want on June 1, 2008.

The single was certified five-times platinum by the Recording Industry Association of America in July 2023.

== Background and recording ==
After signing with Photo Finish Records, the duo began recording "Don't Trust Me". Being one of the duo's more controversial songs and looking back at the track, Foreman told Alternative Press that "We're different musicians now, and we've made changes in the sense of our music. And I think it will show. The times have changed, and we've changed, too, as artists."

== Release ==
"Don't Trust Me" was released on June 1, 2008, as the lead single for the band's label debut. "Don't Trust Me" is also featured in the game, Tap Tap Revenge for the iPhone OS. It was also used on The Real World, Pretty Little Liars, The Vampire Diaries, and The Hills. The official remix features Kid Cudi.

== Composition ==
"Don't Trust Me"
A 19-second sample of 3OH!3's "Don't Trust Me" song where the chorus is played.

"Don't Trust Me" was written by Sean Foreman, Nathaniel Motte and Benny Blanco, while production was handled by Matt Squire, 3Oh!3 and Blanco. The song is written in the key of G minor and is set in the time signature of common time with a tempo of 130 beats per minute. Foreman and Motte's vocal range spans two octaves, from F_{4} to D_{6}. One of lines in the song goes "our tongues always pressed to your cheeks" which Foreman stated is "about this kind of girl who always had her tongue in her cheek." Motte revealed to The Denver Post that the song was almost cut from the album because he was worried about a couple of lines in particular, but they decided to keep it after his father reassured him that people would get that it was only a joke. The line in particular, "Shh, girl, shut your lips/Do the Helen Keller and talk with your hips" was thought of by Foreman, who asked Motte to sing that part of the song, but he originally thought that it would get them a lot of heat. Another line in the song that goes "tell your boyfriend if he says he's got beef, that I'm a vegetarian and I ain't fucking scared of him" came from Foreman who was a vegan at the time and thought the lyric was "a good punchline." Speaking about the lyrics in retrospect and if the duo had any regrets writing it, Motte told Paper that "we came up with this really funny line and we were worried about whether it would offend people, but it was like, no, man — it's funny. People will get that it's tongue-in-cheek. In retrospect if we'd known that many people were going to listen to it maybe we would've thought more about it, but that's kind of the beauty of what we did and I think people understand that."

== Critical reception ==
Professional ratings
Review scores
| Source | Rating |
|---|---|
| About.com | 4/5 stars |
| Digital Spy | 2/5 stars |

The song received mixed reviews from music critics, with many criticizing the lyrics for being misogynistic. Lou Thomas of BBC called the song "lyrically disturbing", commenting that "some might go so far as to argue it's misogynistic and offensive". Whitney Pastorek of Entertainment Weekly stated, "it's gonna take a lot more than some loincloths to make up for actually recording a line like 'Shush girl, shut your lips / Do the Helen Keller and talk with your hips'." Alex Fletcher of Digital Spy noted, "If you can dig beneath the 'irony', there's a half-decent pop tune wrestling for attention here, which explains why they've recently nabbed a support slot with Katy Perry. Sadly, however, 3OH!3's (delete where applicable) parody/misogyny is just so uninteresting and lacking in humour that it's unlikely you'll notice the music much anyway." Paul Lester of The Guardian wrote, "Auto-Tuned vocals – some rapped, some 'sung', in the loosest sense of the word – and the sort of misogynist fratboy humour that Asher Roth seems to be constantly on the verge of indulging in. 'Shush, girl, shut your lips, do the Helen Keller and talk with your hips,' go the lyrics to 'Don't Trust Me'. Elsewhere, the song advises us, 'Don't trust a ho'. Funny, we always found 'hos' to be pretty reliable as a rule."

A positive review came from Bill Lamb of About.com who remarked, "Bratty, insolent and irreverent, it does actually work. You can be offended, but I suggest dancing instead." Paolo Ragusa of Consequence.net also gave the track a positive review writing, "It's clear in its shiny, falsetto-laden chorus hook, with each 'woo-oo' a playful assertion that yes, these guys are pop stars." However, he felt that the "aforementioned 'jokes' about 'beef' and 'doing the Helen Keller,' a prime example of the edgy late 2000s Family Guy-style humor that, at the time, was still being celebrated."

== Chart performance ==
"Don't Trust Me" became the band's breakout hit. The song debuted at number 99 on the Billboard Hot 100 on the week ending November 15, 2008. It was their first top 10 hit in the U.S., reaching number nine on the Hot 100 on the week ending May 7, 2009, selling 123,000 copies. The song eventually peaked at number seven on the Billboard Hot 100 in its 23rd week on the chart. It has also been a huge success on U.S. Mainstream Top 40 radio, topping the chart for a week. The song peaked within the top ten on the Canadian Hot 100, at number six. "Don't Trust Me" has done particularly well in Oceania, where it has reached the top 3 in Australia, and the top 10 in New Zealand. It has also reached #5 in Finland. On July 19, 2009, the single entered the UK singles chart at #21. On April 26, 2010, "Don't Trust Me" re-entered the UK Top 40 at #22.

In April 2009, the song was certified platinum by the Recording Industry Association of America, denoting sales of one million units. As of June 2013, the single has sold 3,322,000 digital units in the United States. In July 2023, the song was certified five-times platinum by the RIAA.

== Awards and nominations ==
Awards and nominations for "Don't Trust Me"
| Year | Organization | Award | Result | Ref(s) |
|---|---|---|---|---|
| 2009 | MTV Video Music Awards | Best New Artist | Nominated | |

=== Accolades ===
Accolades for "Don't Trust Me"
| Publication | Country | Accolade | Year | Rank | Ref. |
|---|---|---|---|---|---|
| ALTop 20 | United States | Top 20 Songs of 2008 | 2008 | 6 | |
| New York Post | United States | Top 208 Best Songs of 2008 | 2008 | 32 | |
| About.com | United States | Top 100 Songs of 2009 | 2009 | 52 | |

== Music video ==
The duo began filming the video in September 2008. The music video premiered on October 20, 2008. The official video begins with words being typed on the screen stating "A global virus of catastrophic proportions has attacked the entire male population. Only two male models from Colorado survive... this is their story". The screen shifts to a shot of the band in briefs at a photo shoot. The set resembles that of a hotel. Another photo shoot takes place at a set resembling a high school wrestling match, where they are dressed in neon-colored singlets. The last photo shoot is in the prehistoric era, and the band is dressed as cavemen. The video ends with a shot of a mushroom cloud, and the words "Transmission terminated" are typed onto the screen, followed by an apology. The video received a nomination at the 2009 MTV Video Music Awards for Best New Artist. In an interview with Paper, Nathaniel Motte discussed the video, commenting:

Yeah, being fun and weird is something we take pride in. I remember that was the most tired I've ever been after that video shoot, we were just going crazy for 16 to 18 hours. I'm not sure if there was a concept, really, it was so chaotic and all over the place. Just the raw energy and the raw strangeness.

== Track listings ==
Digital download
| No. | Title | Length |
|---|---|---|
| 1. | "Don't Trust Me" | 3:13 |

CD single
| No. | Title | Length |
|---|---|---|
| 1. | "Don't Trust Me" (Explicit Album Version) | 3:13 |
| 2. | "Still Around" (Remix) | 3:23 |

== Personnel ==
Credits for "Don't Trust Me" adapted from CD liner notes.

- Sean Foreman – vocals, producer
- Nathaniel Motte – vocals, producer
- Matt Squire – producer, mixing
- Benny Blanco – co-producer
- Travis Huff – mixing
- Eric Stenman – additional engineering
- UE Nastasi – mastering (Sterling Sound, New York, NY)

== Charts ==
=== Weekly charts ===
Weekly chart performance for "Don't Trust Me"
| Chart (2008–2009) | Peak position |
|---|---|
| Australia (ARIA) | 3 |
| Belgium (Ultratip Bubbling Under Flanders) | 3 |
| Canada Hot 100 (Billboard) | 6 |
| CIS Airplay (TopHit) | 96 |
| Finland (Suomen virallinen lista) | 5 |
| Germany (GfK) | 95 |
| Ireland (IRMA) | 17 |
| Lithuania (European Hit Radio) | 67 |
| Netherlands (Dutch Tipparade 40) | 8 |
| New Zealand (Recorded Music NZ) | 8 |
| Poland (ZPAV) | 16 |
| Scottish Singles Sales (Official Charts) | 84 |
| Singapore Airplay (Mediacorp) | 4 |
| UK Singles (Official Charts) | 21 |
| US Billboard Hot 100 | 7 |
| US Adult Pop Airplay (Billboard) | 34 |
| US Pop Airplay (Billboard) | 1 |
| US Rhythmic Airplay (Billboard) | 27 |

=== Year-end charts ===
Year-end chart performance for "Don't Trust Me"
| Chart (2009) | Position |
|---|---|
| Australia (ARIA) | 33 |
| Canada (Canadian Hot 100) | 37 |
| UK Singles (OCC) | 194 |
| US Billboard Hot 100 | 30 |
| US Mainstream Top 40 (Billboard) | 16 |

== Certifications and sales ==
Certifications for sales for "Don't Trust Me"
| Region | Certification | Certified units/sales |
|---|---|---|
| Australia (ARIA) | Platinum | 70,000^{^} |
| Canada (Music Canada) | 3× Platinum | 120,000^{*} |
| New Zealand (RMNZ) | Platinum | 30,000^{‡} |
| United Kingdom (BPI) | Gold | 400,000^{‡} |
| United States (RIAA) | 5× Platinum | 5,000,000^{‡} |
^{*} Sales figures based on certification alone.^{^} Shipments figures based on certification alone.^{‡} Sales+streaming figures based on certification alone.

== Release history ==
Release history and formats for "Don't Trust Me"
| Region | Date | Format | Versions | Label | Ref. |
|---|---|---|---|---|---|
| United States | June 1, 2008 | CD | Original | Photo Finish | |
| Various | June 10, 2008 | Digital download | Original | Photo Finish | |
| United States | August 12, 2008 | Alternative radio | Original | Photo Finish | |
| Australia | April 10, 2009 | CD | Original | Warner Music Australia | |
| United Kingdom | June 29, 2009 | CD | Original | Photo Finish | |
| Various | July 10, 2009 | Digital download | Remixes EP | Photo Finish | |
