= Want (3OH!3 album) =

Studio album by 3OH!3
- Released: July 8, 2008
- Genres: Electropop; crunkcore; electro-hop; dance-pop
- Length: 39:16
- Labels: Photo Finish; Atlantic
- Producers: Matt Squire; 3OH!3; Benny Blanco

3OH!3 chronology
3OH!3 (2007)	Want (2008)	Streets of Gold (2010)

Singles from Want
- 1. "Don't Trust Me" Released: June 1, 2008; 2. "Starstrukk" Released: August 4, 2009; 3. "Still Around" Released: December 8, 2009

Want is the second studio album by American electronic music duo 3OH!3. It was released on July 8, 2008, and is their first album with record label Photo Finish. The album was produced by Matt Squire and 3OH!3.

== Background and recording ==
Want was recorded within four to five weeks. According to Nathaniel Motte, they went into the studio for "16 hours straight" to work on the album. The album was produced by the duo themselves and Matt Squire, as well as from Benny Blanco on a few tracks.

== Title ==
When asked about the title of the album, Nathaniel Motte said, "I was texting my brother or something about the tracks we were making. At one point he texted me back, saying, 'I want it.' So I began telling him how cool they were, and he just texted me back 'WANT, WANT!'."

== Release ==
"Don't Trust Me" was released as the lead single from Want on June 1, 2008. It was released for digital download on June 10. The song was met with commercial success, peaking at number seven on the US Billboard Hot 100. The album was officially released on July 8, 2008. In support of the album, the group performed at that year's Vans Warped Tour. The music video for "Don't Trust Me" premiered on October 20, 2008. The duo joined Katy Perry on a European tour in February 2009. From March to May 2009, they co-headlined the Alternative Press tour with The Maine and Family Force 5, with support from Hit the Lights and A Rocket to the Moon. The duo performed at the 2009 Vans Warped Tour. The original music video for "Starstrukk" was premiered by AOL on June 8, 2009. It was serviced to contemporary hit radio as the album's second single on August 4, 2009. A remix version featuring Katy Perry was released on September 8, 2009, and peaked at number 66 on the Billboard Hot 100. The second music video for the song featuring Perry was released on October 26, 2009. A music video for "Still Around" was released on August 20, 2009, and was eventually released as the album's third and final single which was sent for radio airplay on December 8, 2009. The track "Punkbitch" was included on the Warped Tour 2008 Tour Compilation.

== Critical reception ==
Professional ratings
Review scores
Source	Rating
Absolutepunk.net	(41%)
AllMusic	3/5 stars
Alternative Press	3.5/5 stars
BBC	(negative)
Clash	(8/10)
Rock Sound	(7/10)

The album has received mixed reviews. Blake Solomon of Absolutepunk.net gave the album a mixed review stating, "It's not that I can't appreciate the tongue-in-cheek ridiculousness of Want. What I can't/won't forgive is the constant fuzzy-fart beats. 'I'm Not Your Boyfriend', 'Baby' and 'Chokechain' throw in some interesting soundbites and electronic doo-dadding (like the latter's middle eastern vibe), but each bass pound sounds more and more like a dirty bowel movement with every passing moment. Another point of contention comes in the screamy nature of Sean Foreman and Nathanial Motte's vocals. 'I Can't Do It Alone' feigns at intelligence, but there is just far too much hasty yelling." However, he complimented the duo's vocal abilities on the tracks "Still Around" and "Richman". Another mixed review came from David Jeffries of AllMusic who noted, "3OH!3's Want has enough hooks and laugh-out-loud filth that it's decent, decided junk and good enough for bumpin' uglies on the dancefloor." Writing for the BBC, Lou Thomas wrote, "Foreman and Motte seem to be conflicted between macho posturing and a need to express emotions, albeit in a resolutely banal fashion. But given the commercial success of the former approach, it's likely their next batch of songs will be more gung-ho than not."

A positive review came from Kevin Angel of Clash describing the album as "a genuinely compelling album and well worth a listen" and remarked, "3Oh!3 create an exciting sound that takes the basics of the 'crunk' sound and combines it with punk, electronic and emo to create their own sound, full of bass heavy tunes, explicit lyrics and distorted guitars." Andy Ritchie of Rock Sound also gave a positive review stating, "The summer anthem 'Don't Trust Me' may be the strongest track here, but there's a thumping energy in 'Holler Til You Pass Out' and 'I'm Not Your Boyfriend Baby' that we can't deny." Dan LeRoy of Alternative Press praised the songs "Still Around" and "Colorado Sunrise", calling the first "surprisingly melodic" and described the latter as a "post-rave comedown."

== Commercial performance ==
Want debuted at number 89 on the Billboard 200. By the end of October 2008, the album sold 48,254 copies. In album's 22nd week on the Billboard 200, it rose from a peak of number 87 to set a new peak of number 44. Due to their hit single "Don't Trust Me" reaching the top ten the follow week, it also increased the sales of Want, selling 10,000 copies which was their best sales week to date. The album has sold over 455,000 copies in the United States as of July 2010.

== Track listing ==
All tracks are written by Sean Foreman and Nathaniel Motte, and produced by Matt Squire and 3OH!3, except where noted.

Standard Edition
No.	Title	Writer(s)	Producer(s)	Length
1.	"Tapp"			1:01
2.	"PunkBitch"			3:51
3.	"Don't Trust Me"	Foreman; Motte; Benny Blanco	Squire; 3OH!3; Blanco^{[A]}	3:12
4.	"Chokechain"			3:31
5.	"I'm Not Your Boyfriend Baby"			3:44
6.	"I Can't Do It Alone"			3:00
7.	"Starstrukk"			3:04
8.	"Richman"	Foreman; Motte; Blanco	Squire; 3OH!3; Blanco^{[A]}	3:19
9.	"Photofinnish"			3:55
10.	"Still Around"			3:07
11.	"Holler Til You Pass Out"			4:10
12.	"Colorado Sunrise"			3:24
Total length:				39:16

US Vinyl Bonus Track
No.	Title	Length
13.	"Starstrukk" (featuring Katy Perry)	3:06

Deluxe Edition Bonus Tracks
No.	Title	Writer(s)	Producer(s)	Length
13.	"Starstrukk" (featuring Katy Perry)			3:23
14.	"Don't Trust Me" (Benny Blanco Remix) (featuring Kid Cudi)	Foreman; Motte; Blanco	Squire; 3OH!3; Blanco^{[A]}^{[B]}	3:17
15.	"Still Around" (Big Mix)			3:25

Notes

- ^{^A} signifies a co-producer
- ^{^B} signifies a remix producer

== Charts ==
=== Weekly charts ===
Weekly chart performance for Want
Chart (2008–10)	Peak position
Australian Hitseekers Albums (ARIA)	4
Canadian Albums (Billboard)	41
Scottish Albums (Official Charts)	79
UK Albums (Official Charts)	77
UK Dance Albums (Official Charts)	1
US Billboard 200	44
US Top Dance Albums (Billboard)	2

=== Year-end charts ===
Year-end chart performance for Want
Chart (2008)	Position
US Top Dance/Electronic Albums (Billboard)	16
Chart (2009)	Position
US Billboard 200	108
US Top Dance/Electronic Albums (Billboard)	3
Chart (2010)	Position
US Top Dance/Electronic Albums (Billboard)	23

== Certifications ==
Region	Certification	Certified units/sales
United States (RIAA)	Platinum	1,000,000^{‡}
^{‡} Sales+streaming figures based on certification alone.
