= Sean Foreman =

American singer, songwriter and rapper

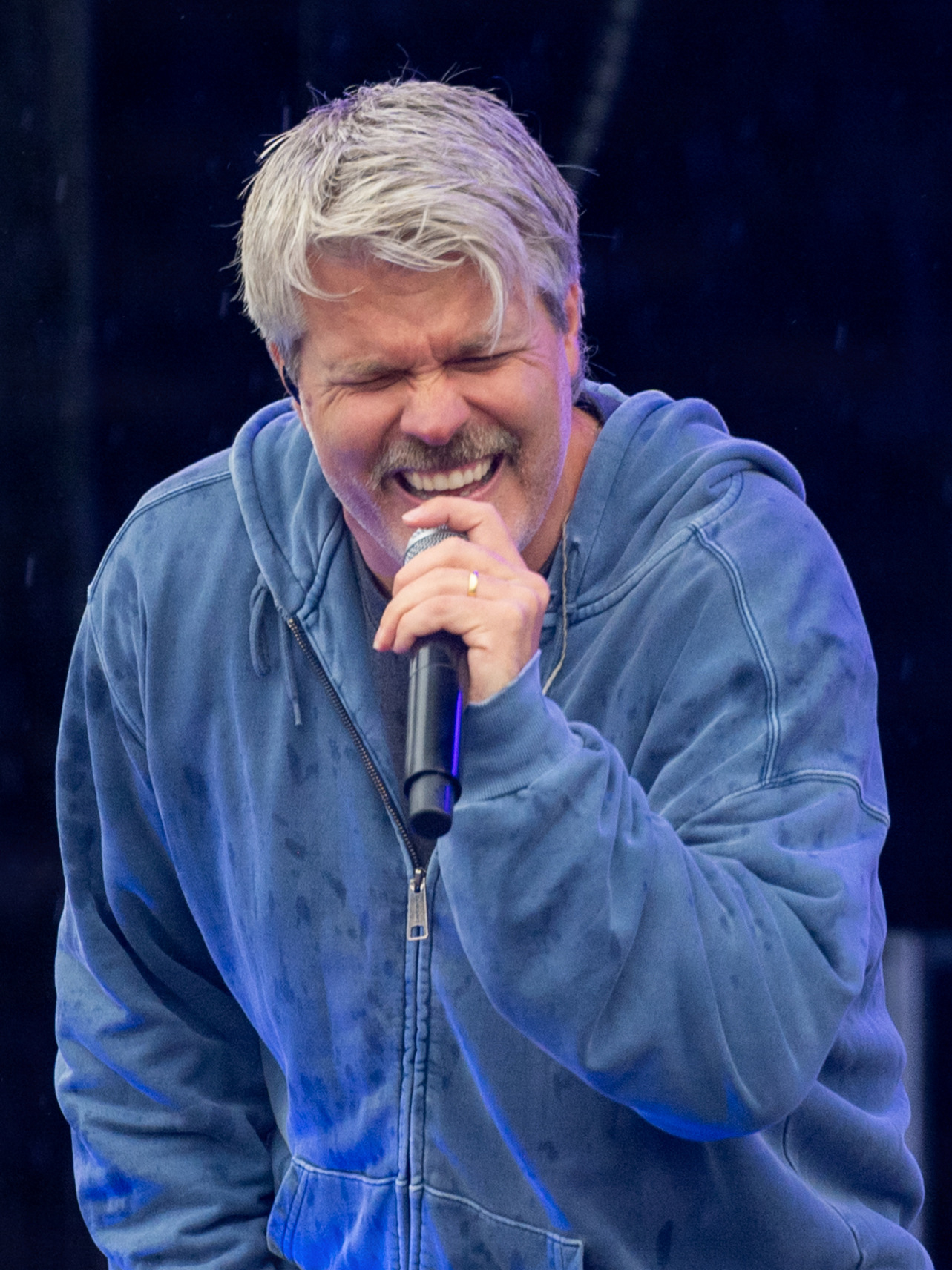
- Foreman performing in 2026

Background information
- Born: August 27, 1985 (age 40); Boulder, Colorado, U.S.
- Genres: Electropop; dance-pop; crunkcore; electronic rock
- Occupations: Singer, songwriter, rapper
- Years active: 2004–present
- Label: Photo Finish
- Member of: 3OH!3
- Spouse: Melanie Mary Knigge (m. 2013; div. 2019) Poppy Platford (m. 2021)
- Website: 3oh3.com

Sean Foreman (born August 27, 1985) is an American singer, songwriter and rapper from Boulder, Colorado. He is a member of the electronic pop duo 3OH!3 with Nathaniel Motte. He has also written and produced for artists such as Ariana Grande, Fitz and the Tantrums, The Summer Set, Karmin and Steve Aoki, among many more.

== Early life ==
Sean Foreman was born in Boulder, Colorado and attended Fairview High School. He graduated from the University of Colorado Boulder with an English major and math minor. He has two brothers, Spencer, who played in the band Cobraconda and another who plays piano.

== Career ==
Before joining 3OH!3, Foreman was competing in MC battles and formed his first hip-hop group with Devin Scheffel. Foreman co-writes all of 3OH!3's music. They released their self-titled debut album on July 2, 2007. The duo's second studio album Want, released on July 8, 2008, went platinum in 2023. The lead single "Don't Trust Me" was No. 1 on pop radio and sold over 6 million copies. "Starstrukk", the second single from the album, went 2× Platinum in the US and peaked within the top five of the charts in countries such as Australia. Its radio-only and deluxe album version of "Starstrukk", featuring pop singer Katy Perry, was released along with a music video. 3OH!3's lead single from Streets of Gold, "My First Kiss" featuring Kesha, went gold after selling over 500,000 copies. The duo released their fourth studio album Omens on June 18, 2013. 3OH!3's fifth studio album, Night Sports, was released on May 13, 2016 on Fueled By Ramen. They released their sixth studio album Need on August 27, 2021.

Foreman has worked and written with Lil Jon, Andrew W.K, Katy Perry, Blues Traveler, Icona Pop, Wallpaper, The Summer Set and Karmin. He wrote on Kesha's debut album Animal, and co-wrote her platinum hit, "Blah Blah Blah." Foreman was a recipient at the 2011 BMI Pop Awards for Award-Winning Songs for the song. He also wrote on Ariana Grande's album Yours Truly, co-writing her ballad "Tattooed Heart".

== Personal life ==
He married his college sweetheart, Melanie Mary Knigge, in 2013. They later divorced in 2019, and in 2021 he married Poppy Platford, with whom he shares a son and a daughter. Foreman is an avid book reader and comic book collector, and made his own comic for the Streets of Gold deluxe record.

Foreman is a World Champion Ultimate Frisbee player. He won the Junior Gold Medal with Team USA in 2004. He won college nationals in ultimate frisbee in 2004 with CU's Mamabird. Foreman also once rode a bicycle from New York City to Boulder. In 2010, he ran the Chicago marathon for the American Cancer Society.

== Discography ==
=== 3OH!3 ===
- 3OH!3 (2007)
- Want (2008)
- Streets of Gold (2010)
- Omens (2013)
- Night Sports (2016)
- Need (2021)

=== As a songwriter ===
Year	Song	Artist	Album
2010	"Hey"	Lil Jon	Crunk Rock
2010	"Blah Blah Blah"	Kesha	Animal
2012	"Dancing to the Same Song"	Elen Levon	Wild Child
2013	"Tattooed Heart"	Ariana Grande	Yours Truly
2014	"Puppet"	Karmin	Pulses
2016	"Feline"	Delta Goodrem	Wings of the Wild
2016	"All My Friends"	The Summer Set	Stories For Monday
2016	"Complicated"	Fitz and the Tantrums	Fitz and the Tantrums
2016	"Darkest Hour"	Charlotte OC	Careless People
2016	"Lavender"	Two Door Cinema Club	Gameshow
2018	"Waste It on Me"	Steve Aoki feat. BTS	Neon Future III
2026	"Swim"	BTS	Arirang
2026	"Normal"	BTS	Arirang
