= Nathaniel Motte =

American singer-songwriter (born 1984)

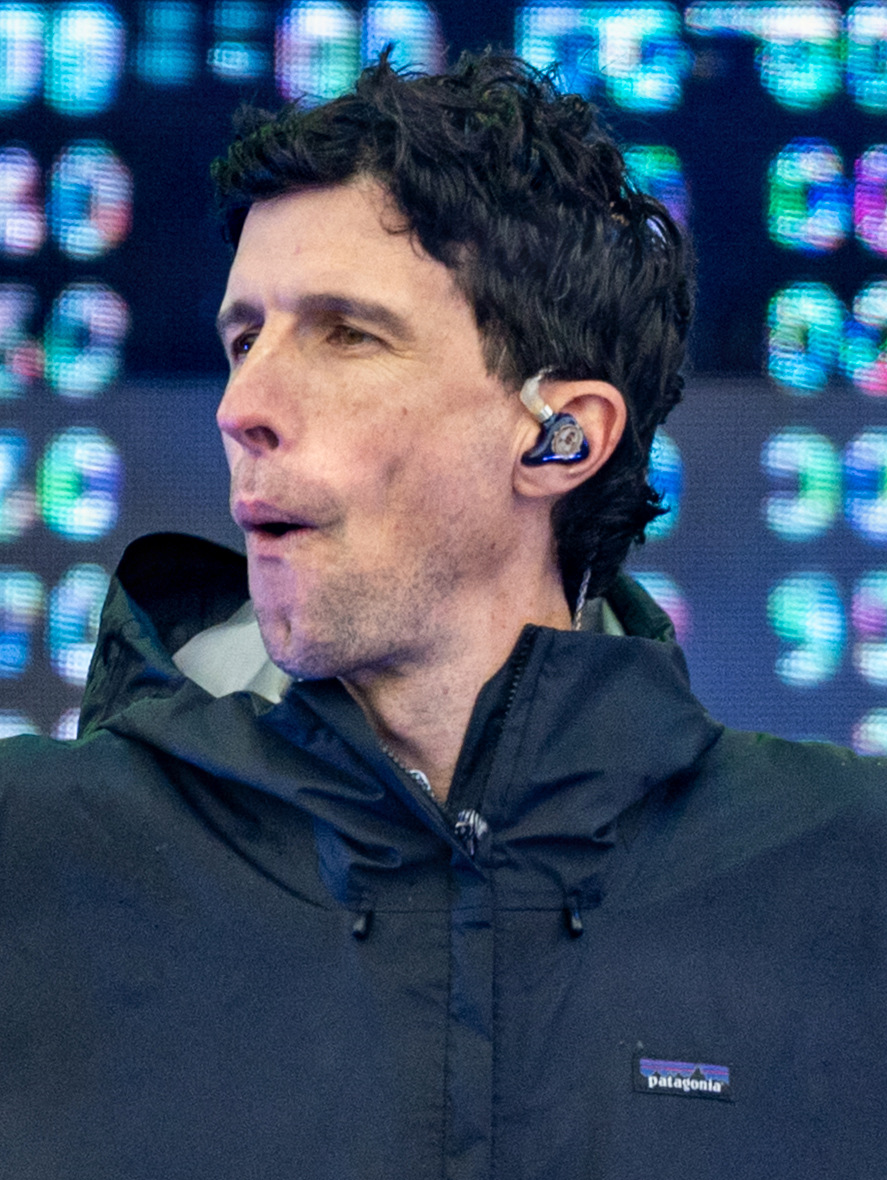
- Motte performing in 2026

Background information
- Born: Nathaniel Warren Seth Motte; January 13, 1984 (age 42); Lincoln, Nebraska, United States
- Origin: Boulder, Colorado, United States
- Genres: Electropop; dance-pop; crunkcore; electronic rock
- Occupations: Singer, songwriter, rapper, record producer, film composer
- Instruments: Vocals, keyboards, guitar, drums
- Years active: 2004–present
- Labels: Photo Finish; Fake Four Inc.
- Member of: 3OH!3
- Spouse: Liz Trinnear (m. 2017)
- Website: nathanielmotte.com

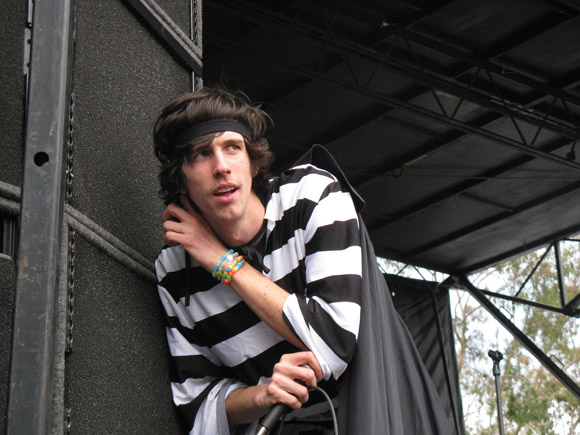

Nathaniel Warren Seth Motte (/ˈmɒtiː/; born January 13, 1984) is an American recording artist, record producer, songwriter, and film composer from Boulder, Colorado. He is a member of the electropop duo 3OH!3 with Sean Foreman. He has also written and produced for artists such as Ariana Grande, Maroon 5, Lindsey Stirling, Karmin and MAX, among many more.

== Early life and education ==
Motte was born to a French mother and an American father, Dr. Warren Motte, distinguished professor of French Literature at the University of Colorado at Boulder. He has one brother, Nicholas Motte.

Motte attended Foothills Elementary, Casey Middle School, Boulder High School, and the University of Colorado at Boulder. In 2006, he graduated with a degree in environmental, population, & organismic biology. The following year Motte was accepted to medical school at the University of Colorado Health Sciences Center.

Motte took piano lessons at a young age, and began to play guitar at home with his brother and father. He began to DJ at age 18, playing in local bars and clubs in Boulder. He began producing music shortly thereafter, using programs like Acid and Reason to make songs at home while he was attending the University of Colorado. He now uses primarily Logic Pro as his production program, although he continues to work in other programs.

== Career ==
Before joining 3OH!3, Motte was DJing in Denver at local hip-hop shows. Motte co-writes and produces all of 3OH!3's music, employing both analog technologies and virtual production tools. He musically directs 3OH!3's live show. They released their self-titled debut album on July 2, 2007. Their second studio album Want was released on July 8, 2008. Their third studio album Streets of Gold was released on June 29, 2010. The duo released their fourth studio album Omens on June 18, 2013. 3OH!3's fifth studio album, Night Sports, was released by Fueled By Ramen on May 13, 2016. They released their sixth studio album Need on August 27, 2021.

He has written and produced songs for Shape Shifters and Jeffree Star. He co-produced and co-wrote the song "Hey" for Lil Jon in 2009. He released a collaborative album The Child Star with Awol One on Fake Four Inc. in 2011. He co-wrote and co-produced the song "Love Somebody" for Maroon 5 in 2012. Motte was a recipient at the 2014 BMI Pop Awards for Award-Winning Songs for the song. In 2013, Motte co-wrote the song "Tattooed Heart" by Ariana Grande. In 2014, Motte produced a song for iSH called "Renegades." He was also a writer/producer for DCF aka Prince Caspian's singles "Jealous" and "Twenty Something" from the album "Pop Songs." He co-wrote and produced Lindsey Stirling's third studio album, Brave Enough. In 2016, he co-wrote the song "Lights Down Low" by Max.

In addition to co-writing and producing, Motte also composes for film, television, and video games. He scored a short movie in 2007 called Uberts (a French film). He also scored music for the video game, The Crew in 2014. In 2019, Motte co-wrote and produced the tracks "Oakland Nights" and "Feed the Beast" for the short movie, The Unauthorized Bash Brothers Experience created by The Lonely Island. He scored music for the 2022 film, Chip 'n Dale: Rescue Rangers.

== Personal life ==
On July 11, 2016, Motte announced on Instagram that he had proposed to his longtime girlfriend, TV host Liz Trinnear, on July 7, 2016. A year later on July 7, 2017, they got married on Flagstaff Mountain in Boulder, Colorado. In January 2023, it was announced Trinnear and Motte were expecting their first child. On May 9, 2023, Trinnear and Motte announced the birth of their daughter named Nico Iris Motte.

== Discography ==
=== Awol One and Nathaniel Motte ===
- The Child Star (2011)

=== As a songwriter and producer ===
| Year | Song | Artist | Album | Notes |
|---|---|---|---|---|
| 2009 | "Bitch, Please!" | Jeffree Star | Beauty Killer | Writer, producer |
| 2009 | "Fresh Meat" | Jeffree Star | Beauty Killer | Writer, producer |
| 2009 | "God Hates Your Outfit" | Jeffree Star | Beauty Killer | Writer, producer |
| 2010 | "Hey" | Lil Jon | Crunk Rock | Writer |
| 2012 | "Dancing to the Same Song" | Elen Levon | Non-album single | Writer |
| 2012 | "Love Somebody" | Maroon 5 | Overexposed | Writer |
| 2013 | "Tattooed Heart" | Ariana Grande | Yours Truly | Co-producer |
| 2013 | "Young, Rich and Dangerous" | Shape Shifters | Collaboration Mixtape 2 | |
| 2014 | "Puppet" | Karmin | Pulses | Writer, producer |
| 2014 | "Renegades" | Ish | Up & Up | |
| 2015 | "Hurricane" | Blues Traveler | Blow Up the Moon | Writer, producer |
| 2015 | "Disarm You" | Kaskade | Automatic | Writer, producer |
| 2016 | "Feline" | Delta Goodrem | Wings of the Wild | Writer, producer |
| 2016 | "Powerlines" | Lindsey Stirling | Brave Enough | Writer, producer |
| 2016 | "Forgotten Voyage" | Lindsey Stirling | Brave Enough | Writer, producer |
| 2016 | "Lights Down Low" | MAX | Lights Down Low EP | Writer, producer |

=== Scoring ===
| Year | Title | Type | Credit | Ref. |
|---|---|---|---|---|
| 2007 | Uberts | Short Movie | Film Composer | |
| 2014 | The Crew | Video Game | Additional Music Producer | |
| 2019 | The Unauthorized Bash Brothers Experience | Short Movie | Composer, producer | |
| 2022 | Chip 'n Dale: Rescue Rangers | Movie | Composer | |
