= Dance or Die =

Dance or Die may refer to:

- Dance or Die (band), an electronic band
  - Dance or Die (Dance or Die album)
- Dance or Die (Family Force 5 album), or the title track
  - Dance or Die (EP), an EP by Family Force 5 containing material released on the album of the same name
- "Dance or Die", a song by Janelle Monáe from the album The ArchAndroid
