= List of crunkcore artists =

This is a list of crunkcore artists. Crunkcore is a musical fusion genre characterized by the combination of musical elements from crunk, post-hardcore, heavy metal, pop, electronic and dance music. The genre often features screamed vocals, hip hop beats, and sexually provocative lyrics. The genre developed from members of the scene subculture during the mid 2000s.

== List of artists ==
- 3OH!3
- Blood on the Dance Floor
- Breathe Carolina
- Brokencyde
- Cobra Starship
- Family Force 5
- Hollywood Undead
- I Set My Friends on Fire
- Jeffree Star
- Metro Station
- Millionaires
