= Guilty Pleasure (Brokencyde album) =

Studio album by Brokencyde
- Released: November 8, 2011
- Genres: Crunkcore, pop rap, hyphy, electropop
- Length: 40:52
- Label: BreakSilence
- Producer: Mike Kumagai

Brokencyde chronology
Will Never Die (2010)	Guilty Pleasure (2011)	The Best of brokeNCYDE (2012)

Guilty Pleasurez

Guilty Pleasure is the third studio album by American crunkcore band Brokencyde, released on November 8, 2011 through Suburban Noize Records. This album features significantly less screaming than earlier efforts.

== Reception ==
Guilty Pleasure was heavily panned worldwide.

Professional ratings
Review scores
Source	Rating
AllMusic	2/5 stars
Sputnikmusic	1./5 stars

== Track listing ==
No.	Title	Length
1.	"Intro"	0:37
2.	"Burnin'" (featuring Tre Nyce)	3:28
3.	"Phenomenon" (featuring Paul Wall)	4:02
4.	"Whoa!"	3:54
5.	"Magnum"	2:56
6.	"Fly Away"	3:06
7.	"The Party Don't Stop"	2:52
8.	"Doin' My Thang" (featuring UnderRated from Potluck)	3:45
9.	"Girls, Girls, Girls"	2:43
10.	"Ocean View"	3:08
11.	"Let's Dance!"	2:36
12.	"U Mad Bro?"	3:19
13.	"Still the King!!!"	4:01
Total length:		40:32

== Guilty Pleasurez ==
Guilty Pleasurez is a re-release of Guilty Pleasure, released on March 13, 2012. The album includes the same track listing, plus one new song ("Never Back Down"), an updated version of "Magnum" (featuring Mickey Avalon) and a 'screamix' of "Doin' My Thang" (with Antz doing screams and featuring The Dirtball).

== Guilty Pleasurez track listing ==
No.	Title	Length
1.	"Intro"	0:37
2.	"Burnin'" (featuring Tre Nyce)	3:28
3.	"Phenomenon" (featuring Paul Wall)	4:02
4.	"Whoa!"	3:54
5.	"Magnum" (featuring Mickey Avalon)	2:56
6.	"Never Back Down" (featuring Deuce)	3:23
7.	"Fly Away"	3:06
8.	"The Party Don't Stop"	2:52
9.	"Doin' My Thang [Scream Version]" (featuring The Dirtball from Kottonmouth Kings)	3:45
10.	"Girls, Girls, Girls"	2:43
11.	"Ocean View"	3:08
12.	"Let's Dance!"	2:36
13.	"U Mad Bro?"	3:19
14.	"Still the King!!!"	4:01
Total length:		44:48

== Personnel ==
Brokencyde

- David "Se7en" Gallegos – unclean vocals, rap vocals
- Julian "Phat J" McLellan – unclean vocals, rap vocals, guitars, bass guitar, keyboards, programming
- Michael "Mikl" Shea – clean vocals
- Anthony "Antz" Trujillo – backing vocals, programming
