= Reanimated (disambiguation) =

Reanimated may refer to:

- Re-Animated, 2006 American live-action animated teen fantasy-comedy television film
- Re-Animated (EP), 2011 EP / Remix album by Wednesday 13
- ReAnimated, 2015 remix album by Jinkx Monsoon
- Reanimated, 2013 EP by Zomboy
- Reanimated, 2013 remix album by Family Force 5
- Reanimated collaboration, Collaborative fan-made animation project
- Reanimated Memories, 2015 studio album by Welsh rock band Man

== See also ==
- Reanimate: The Covers EP, 2011 EP by Halestorm
