= Replace Me =

Replace Me may refer to:

- "Replace Me", a song by American Christian rock music ensemble Family Force 5 from the album Business Up Front/Party in the Back
- "Replace Me", a song by American hip hop artist Nas from the album King's Disease
