= 3001 =

3001 may refer to:

- 3001, the post code of Melbourne, Australia
- 3001, the first year of the 31st century and the 4th millennium
- 3001 (Dance or Die album), a 1991 album
- 3001 (Rita Lee album), a 2000 album, or the title track
- 3001: A Laced Odyssey, a 2016 album by Flatbush Zombies
- 3001: The Final Odyssey, a 1997 novel by Arthur C. Clarke
- "3001", a song by J. Cole from Might Delete Later
