= I'm Not a Fan, but the Kids Like It! =

Studio album by Brokencyde
- Released: June 16, 2009
- Recorded: 2007–2009
- Genre: Crunkcore
- Length: 62:48
- Label: BreakSilence
- Producer: Mike Kumagai, Se7en

Brokencyde chronology
BC13 EP (2008)	I'm Not a Fan, but the Kids Like It! (2009)	Will Never Die (2010)

Singles from I'm Not a Fan, but the Kids Like It!
- 1. "Freaxx" Released: October 1, 2008; 2. "Get Crunk / 40 Oz" Released: 2009 (UK Only); 3. "Booty Call" Released: May 19, 2009

I'm Not a Fan, but the Kids Like It! is the debut album by American crunkcore group Brokencyde.

== Reception ==
=== Commercial performance ===
The album debuted at number 86 on the Billboard 200, with over 6,000 copies sold in the first week.

=== Critical reception ===
Professional ratings
Review scores
Source	Rating
AllMusic	2.5/5 stars
NME	0/10
Sputnikmusic	(1/5)

NME gave the album a 0 out of 10 and stated, "even if I caught Prince Harry and Gary Glitter adorned in Nazi regalia defecating through my grandmother's letterbox I would still consider making them listen to this album too severe a punishment." Kerrang! said that "I'm Not a Fan... boasts a self-aware title, but that's where all trace of intelligence ends." AllMusic's review stated that, although the album displays an "irresponsible attitude toward drinking, women, and songwriting", it also boasts "silly energy" and "some great ideas conceived in a high-school hallway."

== Track listing ==
No.	Title	Length
1.	"Intro"	0:40
2.	"Freaxx"	3:34
3.	"Skeet Skeet"	3:57
4.	"Late Nite Call" (skit)	0:44
5.	"Booty Call" (featuring E-40)	3:24
6.	"Get Crunk"	4:23
7.	"Yellow Bus"	3:22
8.	"Get Up" (featuring Daddy X)	3:48
9.	"Jealousy"	3:33
10.	"Poppin'"	3:20
11.	"40 Oz"	4:29
12.	"Sex Toys"	2:58
13.	"Rockstar"	4:06
14.	"Schitzo"	4:08
15.	"Scene Girls"	3:43
16.	"Tipsy"	4:57
17.	"I'm Sorry" ("I'm Sorry" ends at 6:39 but is succeeded by an untitled hidden track which begins at 6:48)	7:45
Total length:		62:48

Australian bonus tracks
No.	Title	Length
18.	"Bree Bree" (re-recording)

== Personnel ==
Brokencyde

- David "Se7en" Gallegos – unclean vocals, rap vocals
- Julian "Phat J" McLellan – unclean vocals, rap vocals, guitars, bass guitar, keyboards, programming
- Michael "Mikl" Shea – clean vocals
- Anthony "Antz" Trujillo – backing vocals, programming

Production

- Produced by Mike Kumagai and Se7en, except for "Scene Girls", "40 Oz.", and "Yellow Bus" which are produced by Tristan Krause
- Executive production by Brad Baker and Kevin Zinger
- Mastered by Tom Baker
- Art direction and design by Casey Quintal

== Chart performance ==
Chart (2009)	Peak position
US Billboard 200	86
US Independent Albums	11
