= Reanimated (Family Force 5 album) =

Remix album by Family Force 5
- Released: June 18, 2013
- Genre: Dance, synthpop, dubstep
- Length: 46:40
- Label: Independent; Capitol

Family Force 5 chronology
The Third (2013)	Reanimated (2013)	Time Stands Still (2014)

Singles from Reanimated
- 1. "Chainsaw (featuring Tedashii)" Released: May 3, 2013

Reanimated is the second remix album by Christian crunk rock band Family Force 5. The album was released independently on June 18, 2013. The album was later released with Capitol Records on October 1, 2013. It is also the last release to feature lead vocalist and founding member Solomon Olds.

It peaked at #9 on the Billboard Top Dance Albums chart.

== Track listing ==
All tracks are written by Nathan Currin, Derek Mount, Jacob Olds, Joshua Olds, Solomon Olds, except where noted.

Album release
No.	Title	Writer(s)	Length
1.	"Chainsaw" (featuring Tedashii)	Tedashii Anderson, Nathan Currin, Derek Mount, Jacob Olds, Joshua Olds, Solomon Olds	3:12
2.	"Phenomenon"	Solomon Olds	3:20
3.	"Superhero (Nico Stadi Remix)"	Currin, Mount, Jacob Olds, Joshua Olds, Lauren Olds, Solomon Olds	6:07
4.	"Cray Button (McSwagger Remix)"	Currin, Riley Friesen, Mount, Jacob Olds, Joshua Olds, Solomon Olds	4:25
5.	"Wobble (Smile Future Remix)"		5:04
6.	"Can You Feel It (The Toxic Avenger Remix)"		4:16
7.	"Paycheck (Riley Friesen Remix)"		2:43
8.	"Zombie (McSwagger Remix)"		3:33
9.	"Get on Outta Here (Riley Friesen Remix)"		2:57
10.	"Next Level" (featuring LZ7 & Soul Glow Activatur)	Solomon Olds, Lindz West	3:09
11.	"Love Addict (RAC Mix)"	Currin, Jacob Olds, Joshua Olds, Solomon Olds	2:51
12.	"Put Ur Hands Up (Davis Harwell Remix)"	Jacob Olds, Joshua Olds, Solomon Olds, Butch Walker	5:08
Total length:			46:40
