= Family Force 5's Christmas Pageant =

Studio album by Family Force 5
- Released: October 6, 2009
- Genre: Christmas, Christian rock, crunkcore
- Label: Transparent, Tooth & Nail

Family Force 5 chronology
Keep the Party Alive EP (2009)	Family Force 5's Christmas Pageant (2009)	III EP (2011)

Singles from Family Force 5's Christmas Pageant
- 1. "Carol of the Bells" Released: October 1, 2009; 2. "It's Christmas Day" Released: December 2009

Family Force 5's Christmas Pageant is the first and final Christmas album by the Christian crunk rock band Family Force 5. It was released on October 6, 2009. It was announced on August 29 by the band at the Christian music festival En Fuego that they had just finished recording the CD.

== Reception ==
Professional ratings
Review scores
Source	Rating
Jesus Freak Hideout	4/5 stars

Andrew Greenhalgh of Soul-Audio.com said the following about the album; "Family Force 5 has done what they do best, remaining true to themselves while crafting a truly enjoyable Christmas album. They retain the best of the covers and imbue things with a festive spirit that's all their own. And best of all? It'll be great to dance to at all those Christmas parties you'll have to attend this year."

Scott Fryberger of Jesus Freak hideout had nothing but praise for the album "I wasn't quite sure what to expect when I heard that Family Force 5 was doing one this year, but I was pleasantly surprised at what they came up with. As the Atlanta boys keep making more music, the quality and maturity of the music keeps increasing. They've crafted ten songs that make up what will probably be one of the best Christmas albums this year - not to mention, what may be the absolute most non-traditional Christmas album to have been made in a long time. "

The single "It's Christmas Day" has received very favorable reviews with John DiBiase of Jesusfreakhideout.com commenting that "Another surprise highlight, is the entirely uncharacteristic FF5 original, "It's Christmas Day", a pop ballad that's fashioned perfectly for pop radio and probably will stand the test of time longer than any of their other renditions here."

== Track listing ==
Album release
No.	Title	Writer(s)	Length
1.	"Carol of the Bells"	Traditional	3:01
2.	"The Little Drummer Boy"	Katherine K. Davis, Henry Onorati, H. Simeone	1:54
3.	"Christmas Time Is Here"	Vince Guaraldi, Lee Mendelson	2:17
4.	"My Favorite Things"	Oscar Hammerstein II, Richard Rodgers	3:59
5.	"Angels We Have Heard On High"	Traditional	3:16
6.	"Do You Hear What I Hear?"	Noel Regney, Gloria Shayne	3:56
7.	"T'was the Night Before Christmas"	Clement C. Moore	4:03
8.	"It's Christmas Day" (featuring Jerome Olds)	Nathan Currin, Derek Mount, Jacob Olds, Joshua Olds, Soloman Olds, Mac Powell	3:57
9.	"The Baby"	Nathan Currin, Derek Mount, Jacob Olds, Joshua Olds, Soloman Olds	3:11
10.	"Wonderful Christmas Time"	Paul McCartney	3:28
Total length:			33:02

== Credits ==
- Solomon Olds (Soul Glow Activatur) - vocals, guitar
- Jacob Olds (Crouton) - drums, vocals
- Joshua Olds (Fatty) - bass, vocals
- Nathan Currin (Nadaddy) - keytar, drum machine, turntables, vocals, tambourine, percussion
- Derek Mount (Chap Stique) - lead guitar

== Tour ==
"The Christmas Pageant Tour" covered 14 American cities. The tour began in Grand Rapids, Michigan on November 28 and ended in Jacksonville, Florida on December 16. The band toured with House of Heroes, Remedy Drive, and the New Zealand punk band All Left Out. After the second show of the tour (November 30) Fatty was admitted to the ICU of a local hospital after he began to vomit blood. A Kidney specialist was called in after his condition deteriorated Later it was confirmed that he was suffering from kidney failure and that he was undergoing dialysis treatment. The band at first vowed to continue the Tour so as not to disappoint fans, however, as Fatty's condition worsened, the band canceled the fourth show of the tour so as to spend time with Fatty. He however made a full recovery and although he did not finish the tour with the band he made his first appearance again with the band at the Parachute Music Festival in late January 2010.

== Awards ==
The album was nominated for Christmas Album of the Year at the 41st GMA Dove Awards. "It's Christmas Day" charted at #37 on the Billboard Hot Christian Songs. "Christmas Time Is Here" charted at #47 on the Billboard Hot Christian Songs.

== Charts ==
Year	Chart	Peak position
2009	U.S. Christian Albums	24
2009	U.S. Dance/Electronic Albums	11
