= Chainsaw (disambiguation) =

A chainsaw is a portable handheld motorized saw with a rotating chain.

Chainsaw may also refer to:

== People ==
- Chainsaw Al, nickname for the corporate executive Albert J. Dunlap (born 1937)
- Chainsaw, female wrestler, one half of a tag-team with partner Spike called "The Heavy Metal Sisters" from the Gorgeous Ladies of Wrestling
- Chainsaw, a graffiti artist better known as ORFN
- Chainsaw Charlie, later stage name for professional wrestler Terry Funk (born 1944)
- Chainsaw, nickname for sportscaster Cookie Randolph of radio show Dave, Shelly, and Chainsaw

== Music ==
- Chainsaw, The Prince of Karate, stage name for Courtney Pollock (born 1975) of the American band The Aquabats
- Chainsaw Records, an independent record label out of Portland, Oregon, United States

=== Songs ===
- "Chain Saw", a 1976 song by the Ramones from Ramones
- "Chainsaw", a 1983 song by Hellhammer from Death Fiend
- "Chainsaw" (Skinny Puppy song), 1987
- "Chainsaw", a 2009 song by Daniel Merriweather from Love & War
- "Chainsaw" (Family Force 5 song), 2013
- "Chainsaw" (The Band Perry song), 2014
- "Chainsaw" (Nick Jonas song)", 2016

== Zines ==
- Chainsaw (punk zine), a UK punk zine published from 1977 to 1984
- Chainsaw (queercore zine), published in the United States between the late 1980s and early 1990s

== Other uses ==
- Chainsaw, a type of serve in the sport of pickleball
- Chainsaw Richard, a character from the cartoon Cartoon Hangover
- "Chainsaw" (Scream Queens), a 2015 television episode

== See also ==
- Chainsaws in popular culture
