= III (Family Force 5 album) =

Studio album by Family Force 5
- Released: October 18, 2011
- Genre: Christian rock, rap, crunk
- Length: 32:11
- Label: Tooth & Nail
- Producer: Chris Wolfman

Family Force 5 chronology
Dance or Die with a Vengeance (2009)	III (2011)	Time Stands Still (2014)

Singles from III
- 1. "Not Alone" Released: 2011; 2. "Get On Outta Here" Released: 2011; 3. "Wobble" Released: 2011; 4. "Paycheck" Released: 2012

III is the third album by Christian alternative group, Family Force 5, released on October 18, 2011 and the last album to feature Solomon Olds before his departure from the band in 2013. The song "Not Alone" charted at No. 47 on the Hot Christian Songs. The next single, "Get On Outta Here", was free for several days before paid release, where it charted at No. 27 on iTunes Rock chart. Wobble charted at No. 20 on the Alternative charts for a week. "Paycheck" was the final single from the album, but did not chart. However, a music video was made for the song.

== Track listing ==
No.	Title	Writer(s)	Length
1.	"Can You Feel It"	Nathan Currin, Derek Mount, Jacob Olds, Josh Olds, Solomon Olds	2:45
2.	"Paycheck"	Nathan Currin, Derek Mount, Jacob Olds, Josh Olds, Solomon Olds	3:33
3.	"Wobble"	Nathan Currin, Derek Mount, Jacob Olds, Josh Olds, Solomon Olds	3:42
4.	"You Got It"	Nathan Currin, Jamie Houston, Derek Mount, Jacob Olds, Josh Olds, Solomon Olds	3:20
5.	"Mamacita"	Nathan Currin, Derek Mount, Jacob Olds, Josh Olds, Solomon Olds	3:09
6.	"Tank Top"	Les Baxter, Nathan Currin, Derek Mount, Jacob Olds, Josh Olds, Solomon Olds	3:20
7.	"Not Alone"	Nathan Currin, Jamie Houston, Derek Mount, Jacob Olds, Josh Olds, Solomon Olds	3:51
8.	"Dang Girl"	Nathan Currin, Derek Mount, Jacob Olds, Josh Olds, Solomon Olds	2:48
9.	"Love Gone Wrong"	Nathan Currin, Dave Lichens, Derek Mount, Jacob Olds, Josh Olds, Solomon Olds	2:42
10.	"Get On Outta Here"	Nathan Currin, Derek Mount, Jacob Olds, Josh Olds, Solomon Olds	3:01
11.	"Superhero"	Nathan Currin, Derek Mount, Jacob Olds, Josh Olds, Solomon Olds, Lauren Olds	3:15
Total length:			32:11

- Superhero was not released with the physical CD; it was released with the Digital Re-Release version on May 23, 2012.

== III.V ==
On October 21, the band announced on Facebook that they would release III.V (pronounced "3.5"), which would include brand new recordings such as "Zombie" and "Cray Button". On March 31, Family Force 5 announced via Twitter and Facebook that III.V was set to be released May 8, 2012.

The EP was released digitally on May 8, 2012, but was not released on iTunes until May 23, 2012.

=== Track listing ===
No.	Title	Writer(s)	Length
1.	"Zombie"	Solomon Olds, Jacob Olds, Joshua Olds, Nathan Currin, Derek Mount, Riley Friresen	3:10
2.	"Cray Button"	Solomon Olds, Jacob Olds, Joshua Olds, Nathan Currin, Derek Mount, Riley Friresen	3:00
3.	"Love Addict (Backwoodz Acoustic Remix)"	Nathan Currin, Jacob Olds, Soloman Olds	2:56
4.	"Kountry Gentleman (Gatorbait Acoustic Remix)"	Jacob Olds, Soloman Olds	3:31
5.	"Fever (Booyah Acoustic Remix)"		3:27
6.	"Superhero (Acoustic Remix)"	Solomon Olds, Jacob Olds, Joshua Olds, Nathan Currin, Derek Mount, Lauren Olds	3:23
Total length:			19:27

- Superhero was added on May 23, 2012

=== "Cray Button" remix and music video ===
After the release of the EP, a fan uploaded a photo to Instagram that changed the "Cray button" from the song of the same name to "Lecrae button." The band re-tweeted the edited photo, which in turn sparked calls by fans for the band to do a remix of the song with Lecrae. On August 2, 2012, Lecrae agreed to do a collaboration with the band. On September 24, 2012, a music video for "Cray Button" premiered on Rapzilla. It featured a verse by Lecrae as well as an appearance by YouTube celebrity Meekakitty, who previously used the song "Zombie" in one of her videos. The following day, the remix version with Lecrae was released as a single on iTunes, and the music video was premiered outside of Rapzilla.

Digital download
No.	Title	Writer(s)	Length
1.	"Cray Button" (featuring Lecrae)	Solomon Olds, Jacob Olds, Joshua Olds, Nathan Currin, Derek Mount, Riley Friresen, Lecrae Moore	3:30

== Reception ==
Professional ratings
Review scores
Source	Rating
Allmusic	3/5 stars
AbsolutePunk	48%
Jesus Freak Hideout	2.5/5 stars 2/5 stars

Critical reception for the album was mixed.

Stephen Thomas Erlewine from Allmusic gave the album three out of five stars saying, "As the group bounces from pop to reggae to rap, they sometimes run the risk of seeming condescending, particularly on their hip-hop cuts, which often run the risk of being parody, but the group is saved by their way with melody: they may not arrive there naturally, but they do know how to hammer their hooks home."

AbsolutePunk gave the album a 48% saying "As a long-time fan of Family Force 5, it is disappointing to watch what was once such an enjoyable and energetic beast relegate itself to a trend-follower. FF5's audio identity, consequently, is all but gone. This has, unfortunately, resulted in the band losing what made them so enjoyable to listen to back when they first began: fun."

The Christian Post gave the album a positive review saying "Family Force 5's new album III is a fantastic journey through the innovative musical minds of crunk rock pioneers that paved the way for artists like LMFAO and 3OH!3"

Jesus Freak Hideout gave the album two reviews, one by Roger Gelwicks, who gave the album a mixed review, saying, "As mentioned, some parts of III are better than the whole and are worth the attention of listeners, and one would be wise to solely invest in these aspects. However, as an entire product, III is far more a disappointment than a joy in the end." The other reviewer, Ryan Barbee, gave the album a negative review saying "It's going to be about having a good time and knowing how to party. But with this album, it feels like an awkward step backward. For this listener… the third time is not a charm." Barbee also criticized the lyrical themes of the music, saying "Yes, they are known for their raucous party music, which is always enjoyable, but this go-around, it's almost all about the same content: girls, girls, girls."

== Charts ==
Chart (2011)	Peak position
US Billboard 200	61
US Top Alternative Albums (Billboard)	13
US Top Christian Albums (Billboard)	3
US Top Rock Albums (Billboard)	17
