= Brokencyde =

American crunkcore group

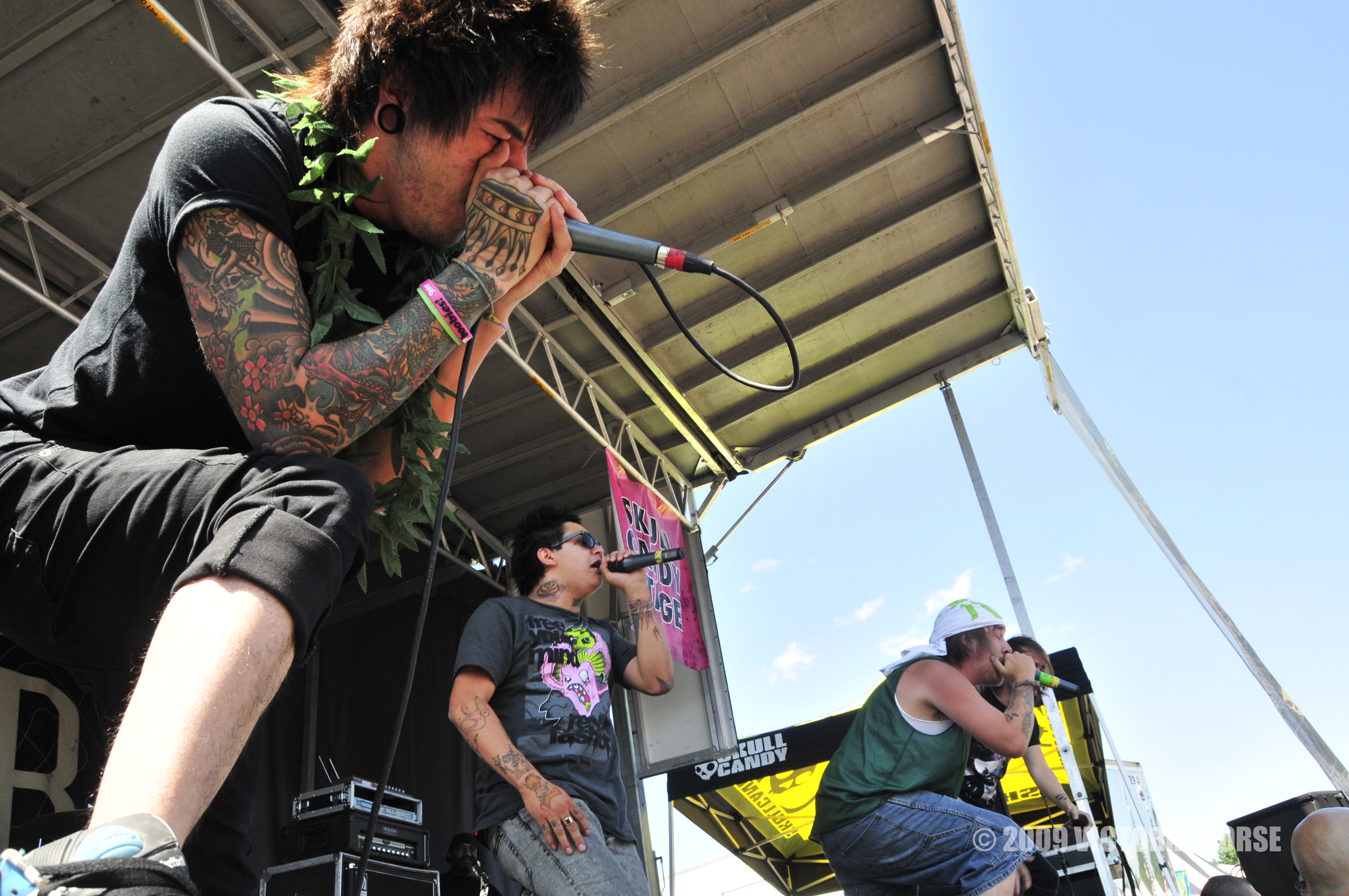
- Brokencyde at the 2009 Warped Tour in Hartford, Connecticut

Background information
- Origin: Albuquerque, New Mexico, U.S.
- Genres: Crunkcore; trap (later)
- Years active: 2006–present
- Labels: PushDrive; X-Ray; Cleopatra; BreakSilence; Suburban Noize
- Members: Mikl; Phat J
- Past members: Se7en; Antz
- Website: brokencyde13.com

Brokencyde (stylized as brokeNCYDE) is an American hip hop group from Albuquerque, New Mexico, founded in 2006. The group's lineup consists of Michael "Mikl" Shea and Julian "Phat J" McLellan, and musically are one of the founding groups in the crunkcore genre, which (in general description) is crunk hip hop music with screamed vocals.

== History ==
=== Formation, record deal and debut album (2006–2009) ===
Brokencyde was founded by singers Se7en and Mikl. The name of the group supposedly originated from the idea that their music was "broke inside" due to personal problems. After the band began promoting themselves online, members Phat J and Antz joined Brokencyde. They released their debut mixtape, The Broken!, in July 2007, followed by another mixtape, Tha $c3ne Mixtape (2008).

Brokencyde toured with bands such as Breathe Carolina, The Morning Of, Karate High School, and Drop Dead, Gorgeous. In July 2008, Brokencyde appeared on MTV's Total Request Live, where they performed the single "FreaXXX" on the segment "Under the Radar". They signed with Suburban Noize Records later that summer, and released the BC13 EP on November 11, 2008 during a promotion with the retail chain Hot Topic.

In 2008, the group performed dates on the Millionaires-headlined "Get F$cked Up" tour, and appeared twice on "Fearless Music TV", performing "Sex Toyz" and "FreaXXX" in December 2008.

The group's first full-length release, I'm Not a Fan, But the Kids Like It!, debuted at #86 on the Billboard 200 in July 2009. Brokencyde was featured on the US Warped Tour 2009, but left the tour in August to play featured appearances in Europe.

Later Brokencyde played dates on "The Original Gangstour" tour with Eyes Set to Kill, And Then There Were None, and Drop Dead, Gorgeous. They played dates on the "Saints and Sinners Tour 2009" with Senses Fail, Hollywood Undead, and Haste The Day.

=== Will Never Die, Guilty Pleasure and departure of Phat J and Antz (2010–2014) ===
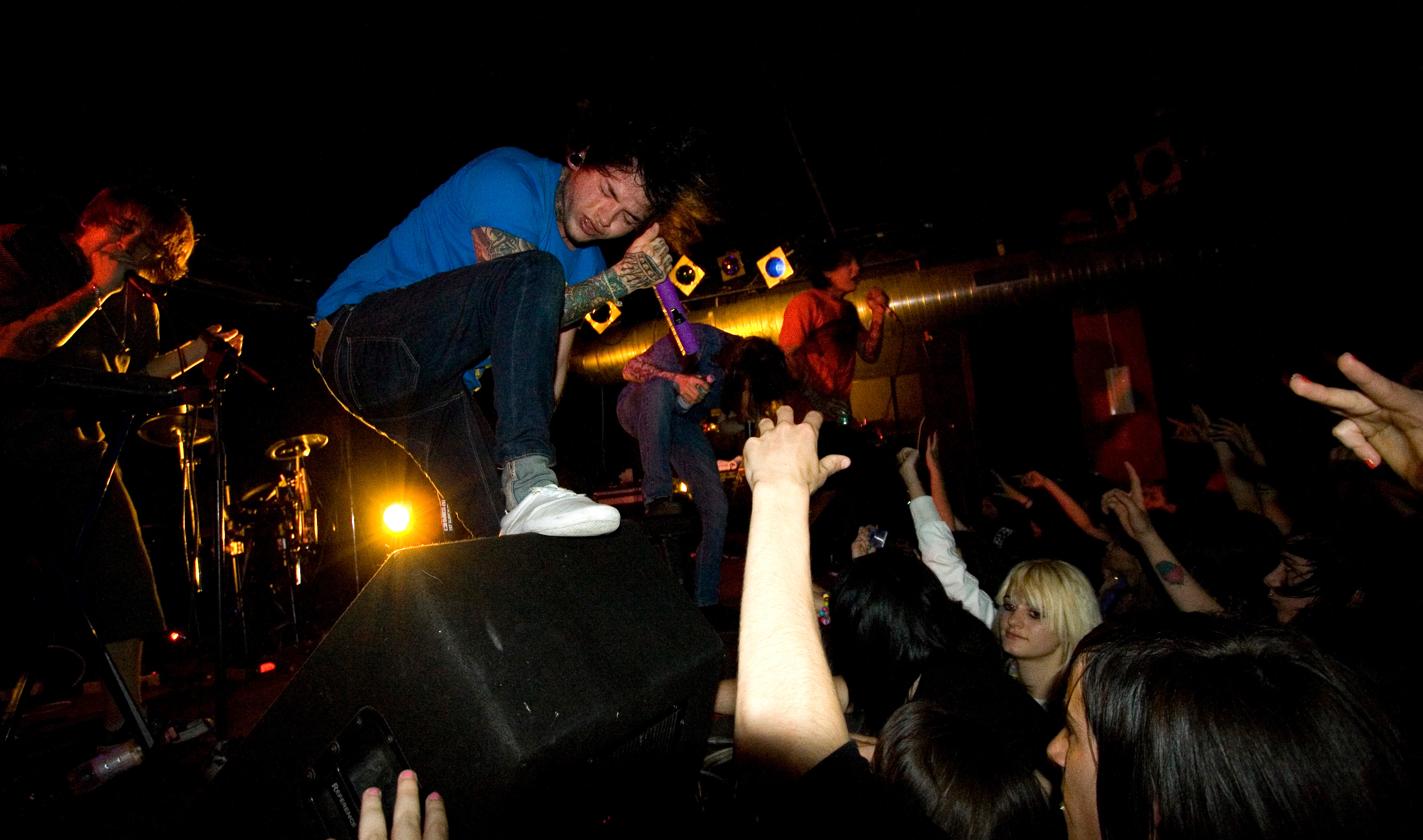
Brokencyde performing in 2010

In early 2010, the band released two songs for free download on their Myspace. The songs were "I'm Da Shizzit" and a cover of the song "Sexy Bitch" by David Guetta. In the summer Brokencyde co-headlined the 2 DRUNK 2 FUCK tour with Jeffree Star. Soon after the tour ended they announced that they were in the studio. In the beginning of fall their new album was announced to be complete with the title of Will Never Die. The album was released on Break Silence Recordings on November 9. In winter 2010, Brokencyde co-headlined the KA$H 4 KU$H tour with the Millionaires. On October 30, the video for "Teach Me How to Scream" was released via MySpace.

In April 2011, the members of Brokencyde assaulted Punchline drummer Cory Muro at Smiling Moose in Pittsburgh, Pennsylvania. This resulted in Muro needing three staples in his head and his friend Johnny Grushecky having a broken nose.

The group released their third studio album Guilty Pleasure on November 8, 2011. An updated version was later released on March 13, 2012 titled Guilty Pleasurez which the band is supporting with a European "Guilty Pleasurez" tour.

In 2012, Brokencyde played dates on the "Fight to Unite Tour" alongside other acts including Blood on the Dance Floor, Deuce (formerly of Hollywood Undead), Polkadot Cadaver, William Control and The Bunny the Bear. On October 29, 2012, Julian "Phat J" McClellan announced via his official YouTube page that he was amicably leaving Brokencyde to pursue a solo career.

=== All Grown Up (2014–2018) ===
In December 2014, Brokencyde launched an Indiegogo crowdfunding campaign, seeking US$30,000 to help fund the recording and marketing of a new album titled All Grown Up. By the time the funding period ended in February 2015, the band only managed to raise US$1,421 from 33 backers — less than 5% of their intended goal. Nevertheless, the group still self-released a 23-track album titled All Grown Up.

=== 0 to Brokencyde, Se7en's departure and the return of Phat J (2018–present) ===
In April 2018, the band announced that they had signed a deal with Cleopatra Records through which they would be releasing their fourth album on Cleopatra Records' imprint, X-Ray Records. The album, 0 to Brokencyde, was released on June 22, 2018.

In 2022, it was announced that Se7en had taken a leave from the group and that Phat J had returned to the lineup.

== Musical style and lyrics ==
Brokencyde are a crunkcore band, fusing elements of screamo and electro music. The band members are self-described "scene kids"; Kerrang! referred to them as a "Myspace band" due to their use of the platform to gain a following early in their career. Metal Hammer also gave them this label. AllMusic stated that the band "combines screamo and crunk into a high-energy party music hybrid," also stating that the band incorporates elements of pop rap, emo and dance music. Kerrang! referred to the band's lyrics as "seriously questionable". AllMusic said their lyrics were "filled with sick jokes and emotional outbursts." The band has explored topics such as sexual intercourse, panties and dancing in its lyrics.

== Critical reception ==
Brokencyde has received negative reviews from critics. Cracked.com contributor Michael Swaim said the band sounded like "a Slipknot-Cher duet", while another Cracked contributor Adam Tod Brown commented on their song FreaXXX "I hate that song so much that I would hold it face down in a bathtub until it drowns if I could."

British comic book writer Warren Ellis considered Brokencyde's "FreaXXX" music video "a near-perfect snapshot of everything that's shit about this point in the culture". A writer for the Warsaw Business Journal attempted to describe their music: "Imagine an impassioned triceratops mating with a steam turbine, while off to the side Daft Punk and the Bee Gees beat each other to death with skillets and spatulas. Imagine the sound that would make. Just try. BrokeNCYDE is kind of like that, except it also makes you want to jab your thumbs into your eyeballs and gargle acid."

The New Musical Express stated in a review of I'm Not a Fan, But the Kids Like It!, that "even if I caught Prince Harry and Gary Glitter adorned in Nazi regalia defecating through my grandmother's letterbox I would still consider making them listen to this album too severe a punishment."

August Brown of the Los Angeles Times writes:

"This 'Albucrazy'-based band has done for MySpace emo what some think Soulja Boy did for hip-hop: turn their career into a kind of macro-performance art that exists so far beyond the tropes of irony and sincerity that to ask 'are they kidding?' is like trying to peel an onion to get to a perceived central core that, in the end, does not exist and renders all attempts to reassemble the pieces futile."

=== Later Assesments ===
In the late 2010s and early 2020s, several music critics such as Vice's Joshua Kim and Eli Enis described Brokencyde as an antecedent to hyperpop and Noise pop artists like 100 gecs and Black Dresses. Regarding the re-evaluation, Shea remarked:

"Theres a lot of artists today - Soundcloud rap, kind of - who I know ... we've influenced."

In 2018, Lil Aaron cited Brokencyde as a pioneering act for the Emo rap genre and paving the way for acts like himself and Lil Peep.

== Members ==
Current

- Michael "Mikl" Shea – singing and rapping vocals (2006–present)
- Julian "Phat J" McLellan – rapping and growled vocals, guitars, bass guitar, keyboards, programming (2007–2012; 2022–present)

Touring

- Paulo "Psuy?" Hidalgo – backing vocals (2011–present)
- Ace Neroexistence – keyboards, programming (2011–present)
- Chad "Big Chaco" Chadillac – drums (2011–present)

Former members

- David "Se7en" Gallegos – screamed and rapping vocals (2006–2022)
- Anthony "Antz" Trujillo – screamed and rapping vocals, keyboards, programming (2008–2014)

Timeline

== Discography ==
LPs

Year	Title	Label	Release date
2009	I'm Not a Fan, But the Kids Like It!	BreakSilence	June 16, 2009
2010	Will Never Die	BreakSilence	November 9, 2010
2011	Guilty Pleasure	BreakSilence	November 8, 2011
2016	All Grown Up	Self-released	February 14, 2016
2018	0 to Brokencyde	Cleopatra, X-Ray	June 22, 2018

EPs

Year	Title	Label	Release date
2008	BC13 Mix		April 28, 2008
2008	BC13	Suburban Noize	October 21, 2008
2022	From The Mud	PushDrive	October 31, 2022
2023	K$ EP (collab with BoyBandTroy)		June 2, 2023
2024	Polaroid Of My Heartbreak	PushDrive	May 10, 2024
2024	While It Lasted	PushDrive	October 18, 2024

Other releases

Year	Title	Label	Release date
2007	The Broken!	Self-released	July 7, 2007
2008	Tha $c3n3 Mixtape	Self-released	2008
2012	The Best Of BC13	BreakSilence	February 23, 2012
2012	DJ Sku Presents: Brokencyde Vol. 1	Self-released	February 23, 2012
