= Family Force 5 (EP) =

Family Force 5 EP

EP by Family Force 5
- Released: 2005
- Label: Maverick, Gotee

Family Force 5 chronology
The Phamily EP (2004)	Family Force 5 EP (2005)	Business Up Front/Party in the Back (2006)

Singles from Family Force 5
- 1. "Kountry Gentleman" Released: 2005

Professional ratings
Review scores
Source	Rating
Jesus Freak Hideout	4/5 stars

Family Force 5 EP was the first recording released by American Christian rock band Family Force 5 under their new name. This EP is exactly the same as The Phamily EP, except for the name of the band and the addition of the song "Cadillac Phunque".

== Track listing ==
No.	Title	Writer(s)	Length
1.	"Kountry Gentleman"	Jacob Olds, Solomon Olds	3:23
2.	"Drama Queen"	Jacob Olds, Solomon Olds	3:51
3.	"X-Girlfriend"	Jacob Olds, Solomon Olds	3:53
4.	"Love Addict"	Nathan Currin, Jacob Olds, Solomon Olds	2:52
5.	"Color of Water"	Jacob Olds, Solomon Olds	2:52
6.	"Cadillac Phunque"	Nathan Currin, Jacob Olds, Solomon Olds	3:27

== Credits ==
- Solomon "Soul Glow Activatur" Olds – Vocals, guitar, programming, synthesizers
- Jacob "Crouton" Olds – Drums, vocals
- Joshua "Phatty" Olds – Bass, vocals
- Nathan "Nadaddy" Currin – DJ
- Brad "20 Cent" Allen – Guitars
