= Audrey Kitching =

American journalist

Audrey Lynn Kitching
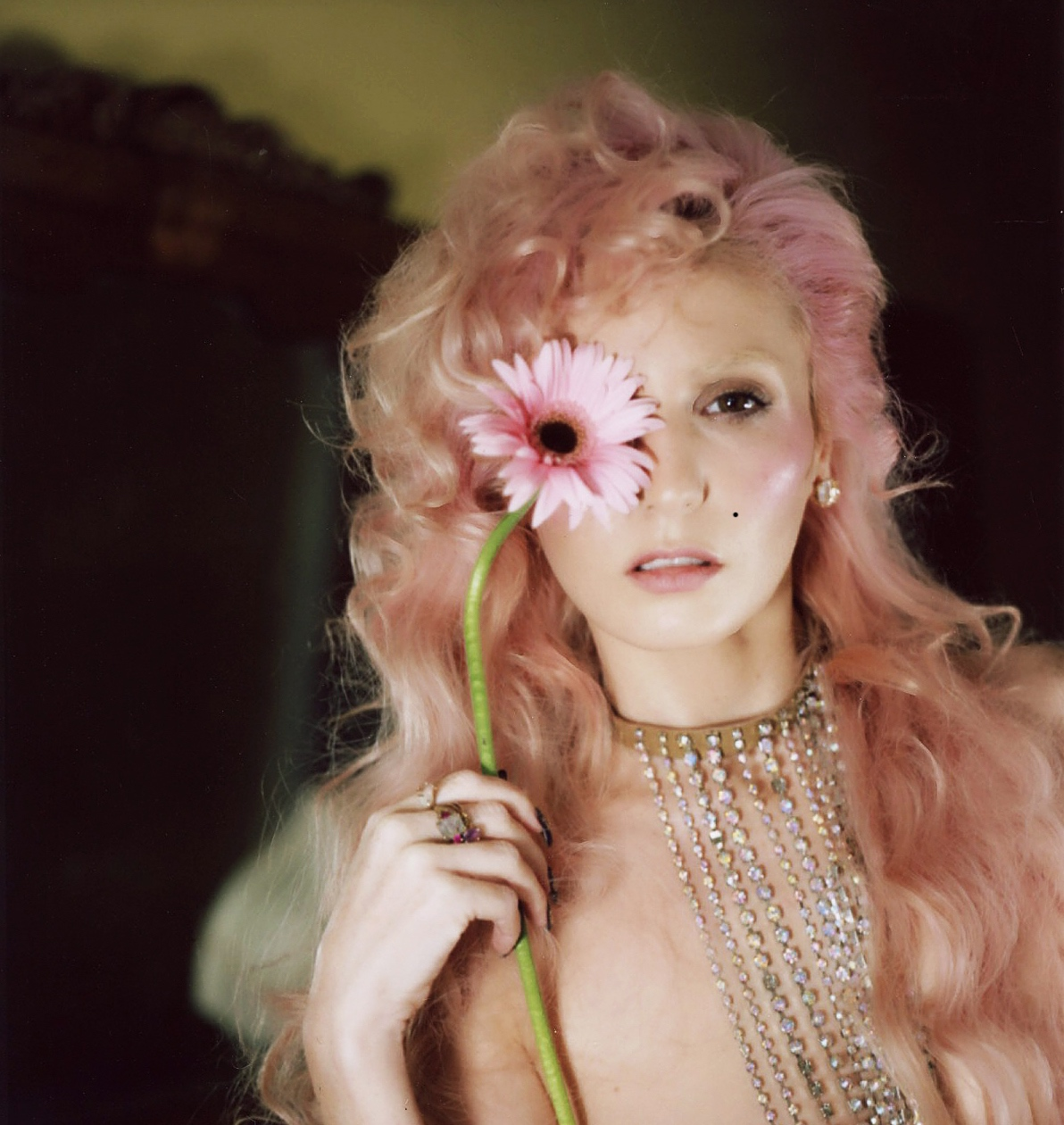
- Kitching in 2016
- Born: Audrey Lynn Kitching; July 26, 1985 (age 41); Collingswood, New Jersey, U.S.
- Occupations: Model; designer; stylist; blogger
- Modeling information
- Height: 5 ft 3.75 in (1.62 m)
- Hair color: Pink
- Eye color: Hazel
- Website: crystalcactus.com

Audrey Lynn Kitching (born July 26, 1985) is an American fashion blogger, model, and fashion designer. In the 2000s, she was considered a Scene Queen from gaining popularity on the sites MySpace and LiveJournal.

Kitching is the owner and founder of an online New Age store called Crystal Cactus.

== Work ==
=== Modeling ===
After being discovered at a hair salon, she began modeling at 14, first appearing in newspaper ads. She launched her blogging career by modeling for photographer friends and posting their work. She obtained her high school GED. She has also worked as an art director for photoshoots.

She has been a spokesmodel for designer Jared Gold, the British shoe company Irregular Choice, the Italian shoe brand Kerol D, and Kohl's Vera Wang. Kitching has appeared in a national Peta2 "Fur Is Dead" campaign, and one of its public service announcement against animal testing in the personal care products industry. In 2013, she was selected to be Karmaloop's Miss KL of the Month, and in April 2014 she appeared in a campaign for a Ray Ban's collection, which was featured by Elle Magazine. She has also appeared in Vogue Italia.

=== Blogging ===
Kitching was a style editor for SpinMedia's now-defunct social media and pop culture website Buzznet, working with the company for over 6 years since they first found her LiveJournal blog in 2006. While working on Buzznet, she hosted a show named 'Trashy Life' with her friend Zui Suicide. Which was said to possibly be picked up for television which never ended up occurring. She explains that she'd gained internet fame through documenting her 'day-to-day life' of touring with bands and working off-handed jobs whilst being homeless.

=== Design ===
Kitching has worked with designer Amber Renee Cunningham to bring her visions to life for several clothing lines and collections, including her once wildly popular brands called Tokyolux, Coco De Coeur, and Audrey Kitching LA. She later started an organic, fair trade luxury fashion brand called LUNA, which was inspired by astrology, positive thinking, ancient ideologies, and magic. She collaborated with Milan-based footwear company Kerol D Milano in 2014, designing a 12-piece vegan capsule footwear collection featured in Elle Italia.

In 2010, Kitching was one of the designers chosen to work with H&M for Designers Against AIDS. Coco de Coeur, Kitching's former clothing line, was described by Nylon as "astonishing," earning comparisons to designs by Meadham Kirchhoff and Jeremy Scott.

=== Energy healing and controversy ===
Kitching, the founder and CEO of Crystal Cactus, is a new age practitioner who does astrology reports, energy healing, crystal work, and readings for others. In early 2013, Kitching created a line of new age crystal pendant jewelry, holistic spa treatments, and gifts that were sold in Urban Outfitters. She also performs aura clearings and chakra and karma balancing. Public backlash came after Kitching's products were revealed to be purchased from Alibaba.

In February 2019, she became the centre of controversy when The Daily Dot detailed allegations of emotional abuse and fraud directed towards Kitching by a former employee.

== Personal life ==
Kitching was born in Collingswood, New Jersey. Kitching dated Panic! at the Disco's lead vocalist Brendon Urie in 2005.
