= Time Stands Still (Family Force 5 album) =

Studio album by Family Force 5
- Released: August 5, 2014
- Genres: Contemporary Christian music, crunk rock, synthpop, Christian rock
- Length: 48:03
- Label: Word
- Producers: Nathan Currin, Riley Friesen, Seth Mosley, Derek Mount, Jacob Olds, Solomon Olds

Family Force 5 chronology
III (2011)	Time Stands Still (2014)

Time Stands Still is the fourth and most recent album from Family Force 5. Word Records released the project on August 5, 2014. Family Force 5 worked with Nathan Currin, Riley Friesen, Seth Mosley, Derek Mount, Solomon Olds, and Jacob Olds on the production of this album.

== Reception ==
Professional ratings
Review scores
Source	Rating
CCM Magazine	3/5 stars
Jesus Freak Hideout	4.5/5 stars
New Release Tuesday	4/5 stars

Signaling in a three star out of five review by CCM Magazine, Matt Conner realizes, "While substantive moments are scattered throughout... the album reflects a new season of life and maturation for the band." John "Flip" Choquette, writes in a four and a half star review from Jesus Freak Hideout, recognizing, "Each and every song, while unique in its own way, delivers the signature energy and sound that the band is known for." Shaving a half star off her rating compared to the aforementioned one, New Release Tuesday's Mary Nikkel discerns, "With Time Stands Still, Family Force 5 serves up songs on fire with a passion for life that is instantly infectious."

== Tracks ==
No.	Title	Writer(s)	Length
1.	"Sweep the Leg"	Nathan Currin, Riley Friesen, Derek Mount, Jacob Olds, Joshua Olds, Solomon Olds	2:59
2.	"BZRK" (featuring KB)	Teddy Boldt, Kevin Burgess, Currin, Friesen, Mount, Jacob Olds, Joshua Olds, Solomon Olds	3:41
3.	"Show Love"	Currin, Friesen, Mount, Jacob Olds, Joshua Olds, Solomon Olds	3:20
4.	"Time Stands Still"	Boldt, Currin, Friesen, Mount, Jacob Olds, Joshua Olds	3:39
5.	"Walk on Water" (featuring Melodie Wagner of Hillsong Young & Free)	Boldt, Currin, Seth Mosley, Mount, Jacob Olds, Joshua Olds	3:11
6.	"Glow in the Dark"	Currin, Friesen, Mount, Jacob Olds, Joshua Olds, Solomon Olds	2:51
7.	"Raised by Wolves"	Currin, Friesen, Mount, Jacob Olds, Joshua Olds, Solomon Olds	3:06
8.	"Jet Pack Kicks"	Currin, Friesen, Mount, Jacob Olds, Joshua Olds, Solomon Olds	3:32
9.	"Xray"	Currin, Friesen, Mount, Jacob Olds, Joshua Olds, Solomon Olds	2:52
10.	"Let It Be Love"	Boldt, Currin, Mosley, Mount, Jacob Olds, Joshua Olds	3:29
11.	"Everybody Lose Your Mind"	Boldt, Currin, Friesen, Mount, Jacob Olds, Joshua Olds, Solomon Olds	3:15
12.	"Dance Like Nobody's Watching"	Currin, Friesen, Mount, Jacob Olds, Joshua Olds, Solomon Olds	2:51
13.	"When Everything's Changing"	Boldt, Casey Brown, Currin, Jason Ingram, Mount, Jacob Olds, Joshua Olds	3:37
14.	"Never Say Never"	Boldt, Currin, Mosley, Mount, Jacob Olds, Joshua Olds	2:51
15.	"This Is My Year"	Boldt, Currin, Mosley, Mount, Jacob Olds, Joshua Olds	2:49
Total length:			48:03

== Charts ==
Chart (2014)	Peak position
US Billboard 200	30
US Top Alternative Albums (Billboard)	8
US Top Christian Albums (Billboard)	1
US Digital Albums (Billboard)	17
US Top Rock Albums (Billboard)	11
