= Will Never Die =

Studio album by brokeNCYDE
- Released: November 9, 2010
- Genre: Crunkcore
- Length: 53:22
- Label: BreakSilence
- Producer: Mike Kumagai; Kevin Zinger (executive); Brad Xavier (executive); Albert Fish (executive)

BrokeNCYDE chronology
I'm Not a Fan, But the Kids Like It! (2009)	Will Never Die (2010)	DJ Sku Presents: Brokencyde Vol. 1 (2011)

Singles from Will Never Die
- 1. "Teach Me How to Scream / Da House Party" Released: October 5, 2010

Will Never Die is the second studio album by American crunkcore band brokeNCYDE, released on November 9, 2010, through BreakSilence Recordings.

== Reception ==
Professional ratings
Review scores
Source	Rating
AllMusic	2/5 stars

Dave Wedge, writing for the Boston Herald, referred to the album as a "snotty, ADD-riddled batch of Auto-Tuned crunkcore", singling out "the painfully embarrassing ballad 'My Gurl' and the bad reggae of 'High Timez'."

== Track listing ==
No.	Title	Music	Length
1.	"Epic Intro"		0:42
2.	"Dis Iz a Rager Dude"	Tristan Krause	4:02
3.	"Always Go Hard"	Krause	3:56
4.	"SHAKE!"	Mike Kumagai	3:09
5.	"Whatcha Want"	Krause	3:05
6.	"T.M.H.T.S. Lesson 1" (skit)		0:52
7.	"Teach Me How to Scream" (featuring Beth "Taxgirl" Chapin)	Krause	3:38
8.	"Money Hungry Hoe"	Krause	3:43
9.	"High Timez" (featuring Daddy X of Kottonmouth Kings)	John Oplinger	4:32
10.	"Where We @?" (skit)		0:36
11.	"Da House Party"	Kumagai	2:56
12.	"My Gurl"	Adam Mitchel	3:39
13.	"Kama Sutra"	Krause	3:13
14.	"Ugly Bitch with a Mustache" (skit)		0:58
15.	"Goose Gogglez"	Krause	3:24
16.	"U Ain't Crunk"	Mason Kilburn	3:18
17.	"Ride Slow"	Krause	4:01
18.	"Sunshine"	Krause	3:40
Total length:			53:32

"Hot Topic Bonus House Party Scream-Along" version

No.	Title	Length
1.	"Get Crunk!"	4:23
2.	"Freaxxx"	3:57
3.	"Booty Call"	3:26
4.	"Schitzo"	4:08
5.	"Bree Bree"	3:53
6.	"Teach Me How to Scream"	3:36
7.	"Da House Party"	2:57
8.	"My Gurl"	3:39
9.	"SHAKE!"	3:08
10.	"Dis Iz a Rager Dude"	4:05

== Personnel ==
- Tom Baker – mastering
- Raymond Brown – CD art and layout
- Beth Chapin – guest vocals on "Teach Me How to Scream"
- Mike Kumagai – production, mixing
- Brandon Turner – photography
- Brad Xavier – executive producer
- Kevin Zinger – executive producer

Brokencyde

- David "Se7en" Gallegos – unclean vocals, rap vocals
- Julian "Phat J" McLellan – unclean vocals, rap vocals, guitars, bass guitar, keyboards, programming
- Michael "Mikl" Shea – clean vocals
- Anthony "Antz" Trujillo – backing vocals, programming
