= Millionaires (group) =

American electronic music artist

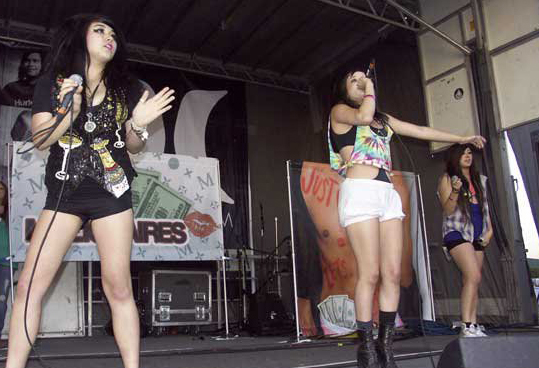
- Melissa Marie Green (left), Dani Artaud (center) and Allison Green (far right) in 2009.

Background information
- Origin: Huntington Beach, California, U.S.
- Genres: Electronic music, electropop, hip hop
- Years active: 2007–present
- Labels: Graveboy Records (previously signed to B-Unique and Decaydance)
- Members: Melissa Green; Meredith Hurley
- Past members: Dani Artaud; Allison Green; Anissa Zermeno
- Website: Instagram page

Millionaires is an American electronic music group consisting of Melissa Marie Green and Meredith Hurley. The group, formed in August 2007, originally consisted of Green and her sister Allison Green, as well as friend Dani Artaud. The group mix explicit lyrics with an electropop backing. Their image and lyrics generated controversy during their early years. The band released three EPs, several singles—including "Stay the Night", which charted for a short time in the UK, and their debut album, Tonight, released in March 2013. In 2016, they released a single with producer Wade Martin titled "When I'm Single".

== History ==
=== 2007–2010: Career beginnings ===
Millionaires started on August 14, 2007, (according to their Myspace signup) "as an accident" when sisters Melissa and Allison Green recorded a song using GarageBand. The song was titled "I Like Money", and the teens then created a corresponding MySpace profile named Millionaires. The third member, Dani Artaud, joined the group after Melissa Marie asked her to join. Later, they created their second song, called "Hoe Down".

At the time of their Myspace debut, they were considering releasing an EP with the title of La La Love or Girls with Guns with their GarageBand songs. They then considered the title Shit Bitch before it was released as Bling Bling Bling! The five songs that made it to the EP were edited by Mark Maxwell; many of their Myspace songs did not make the EP.

They began to perform shows in California and traveled only small distances for gigs. They got spots in music festivals such as Rockin' Roots, Bamboozle Left 2008, and Audio Overload 2008. In July 2008, they went on their first tour, co-headlining with Breathe Carolina across California and other Western states. Later in July, they headlined the Get F$cked Up tour. That same month, they performed their Myspace song "I Move It" on MTV's TRL as part of On the Radar, a segment where popular "hipster" bands perform.

They made a short song titled "Ooh Uh Huh", which became the theme song for MTV's reality show A Double Shot at Love with the Ikki Twins. Their song "Hey Rich Boy" was also used as the theme for MTV's Teen Cribs. Their song "Alcohol" was also featured on the soundtrack for the third series of Skins. Their songs "I Like Money" and "I Move It" were featured on the MTV show My Life as Liz. Their cover of Chic's song "Le Freak" is featured on the MTV film Turn the Beat Around.

The band started up again in January and February 2009 on their Just Got Paid, Let's Get Laid tour, which sold out on every stop, starting in Oxnard, California and reaching its west coast crescendo on February 23, 2009, at a small, impromptu gig for MTV's My Sweet 16 bash in Capitol Hill, quickly selling out the cozy venue to die-hard fans and local residents of the hipster dominant, suburban nook of Seattle, Washington. They also teamed up with UK hardcore DJ S3RL, DJ Samurai, and DJ Hook to make the Myspace single "Martinis & Mixed Feelings", for which an electro/techno remix was made. On June 23, 2009, they released a new EP, titled Just Got Paid, Let's Get Laid, which had three songs from Bling Bling Bling! and two new songs. During their early days the group were often wrongly cited as crunkcore but are mainly an electropop group. Their Christmas song "Rated Xmas" was released on December 16.

=== 2010–2011: "Stay the Night", label changes and Artaud's departure ===
The group were signed to English record label B-Unique in late 2009, and a debut album was set for release in 2010. The single "Stay the Night" was released in early 2010 to promote the upcoming album and the trio embarked on two UK tours for further promotion. "Stay the Night" was also put forward to the BBC team to represent the UK at Eurovision 2010, but was eliminated by Pete Waterman before reaching the live decisions. The tracks "Prom Dress" and "Microphone" were released online, as well as a sample mix of the album containing snippets of unreleased tracks "That's How We Party" and "Hush Little Boyfriend".

After a brief period of no further promotion or updates, Dani had left the group, they were dropped by their UK label, and the planned album had been scrapped. Five songs from their MySpace that had originally been planned for the album, along with "Stay the Night", were released on an EP titled Cash Only in September 2010.

=== 2012–2014: Debut album and mixtape ===
The first single from their album, "Drinks on Me", was released on January 31, 2012, on iTunes; Millionaires then released a music video for the song. Ricky Hoover, former lead vocalist of the deathcore band Suffokate and current lead vocalist for Ov Sulfur, guest starred in the video as Melissa's boyfriend.

On May 15, 2012, their mixtape Your Girl Does Party was released, with tracks featuring Kreayshawn, Trina, Diamond, Shanell Woodgett, Nightclub Fight Club, and Riff Raff. It was produced by Khris Lorenz.

Millionaires released their debut album March 13, 2013, titled Tonight, featuring 11 songs including the single "Drinks on Me". The album sold 697 copies in its first week. Millionaires embarked on a promotional tour for the album from April through June 2013.

During the tour, they debuted three unreleased remixes: EDM remixes of "Drinks on Me" and "Put It in the Air", both produced by The Knuckledusters and a remix of "Dat Boi" featuring Trace Cyrus of Metro Station. Tonight received negative reviews from music critics.

On March 28, 2014, Millionaires released the free song "Myspace Pic" on their SoundCloud. It was produced by DJ Foreign Warren of The Knuckledusters and was a parody of "Selfie" by The Chainsmokers.

=== 2015–present: Bad Girls Club, singles releases, Allison's & Anissa’s departures, & new members ===
From March to April 2015, Melissa announced they were working on music with producer Foreign Warren of The Knuckledusters.

In early October, they were both cast in the Twisted Sisters season of Bad Girls Club as replacements. They entered in the fourth episode, titled "No Room for T.H.O.T.S.", which aired on April 6, 2016, with another set of sisters; Jaimee and Jazmyn Wallace. They left during episode 8, "OG Overthrow", following multiple confrontations with the Wallace sisters.

On December 18, 2015, the duo released a song titled "When I'm Single" with a music video directed by Wade Martin Handley.

On February 14, 2017, the Millionaires released the single "Rich Girls" for which they collaborated with Caked Up.

On August 14, 2022, Melissa announced that she would continue Millionaires as a solo artist due to Allison deciding to leave the group in order to focus on her work as a photographer.

In June 2023, Meredith Hurley & Anissa Zermeno joined the group. The new members debuted during the Millionaires' performance at So What?! Musical Festival in Dallas Texas on June 24, 2023 In late 2024, Anissa Zermeno would quietly leave the group to focus on creative projects, leaving Millionaires as a duo consisting of Melissa Marie & Meredith Hurley as of today.

== Musical style ==
Alternative Press described them as sounding like an "edgier Ke$ha" and as being "the epitome of Myspace in its prime." The group is associated with the scene subculture by some publications, such as Alternative Press. Additionally, Kerrang! referred to them as a "Myspace band" due to their popularity on Myspace early in their career.

== Tours ==
Millionaires have headlined four tours: the Get F$cked Up tour from July–August 2008 with Hyper Crush, Brokencyde, And Then There Were None, and The Arrival; the Just Got Paid, Let's Get Laid tour from January–February 2009 with Cash Cash, I Set My Friends on Fire, and Watchout! Theres Ghosts; the Ka$h 4 Ku$h Tour with Brokencyde, Kill Paradise and The Hit; and their tour, the I Get Around Tour from June to July 2011 with Breathe Electric, Christian TV, Set It Off, and Big Heed and ALIen on select dates. Their latest tours have been the Loaded Tour with Mickey Avalon which lasted from June 3-July 1, 2012, and the Your Girl Does Party Tour which lasted from July 2-July 18, 2012. Also, their album release tour, titled, The Tonight Tour, started April 12, 2013, and continued until mid June 2013. From May 20, 2013, to June 2, 2013, Millionaires toured with Brokencyde in the United Kingdom, Scotland, France, and Germany.

- They co-headlined a tour across the West coast with Breathe Carolina in July 2008.
- They played at 2009 Vans Warped Tour on the Skullcandy stage and the Hurley.com stage.
- They played five shows in different areas of the United Kingdom in early December 2009. They were scheduled to play a second show in London on December 9, but it was canceled because of a cyst found inside Allison's lower abdomen, which required emergency surgery. In May 2010, Millionaires returned to the UK for a mini tour. They played at the Slam Dunk festivals in both Hatfield and Leeds. They played at Middlesbrough Music Live on June 6, 2010.
- They co-headlined a tour with Mickey Avalon called the Loaded tour, followed by the Your Girl Does Party tour through 2012.
- They headlined a US tour with direct support from Ashland High and Lancifer in the spring of 2013.
- They co-headlined a short Europe tour with Brokencyde in May 2013.
- Millionaires went on a January / February 2014 tour.
- Millionaires toured with Blood on the Dance Floor, Trap House Rave, The Knuckledusters and Haley Rose on the Bitchcraft Tour during the summer of 2014.
- Millionaires headlined a DJ Set tour from January to February 2015 with Koly Kolgate, Eryn Woods, and DJ Foreign Warren.

== Group members ==
Current members
- Melissa Marie Green – vocals (2007–present)
- Meredith Hurley – vocals (2023–present)

Former members

- Dani Artaud – vocals (2007–2010)
- Allison Green – vocals (2007–2022)
- Anissa Zermeno – vocals (2023–2024)

Timeline

== Discography ==
=== Studio albums ===
Title	Album details
Tonight	Released: March 13, 2013; Format: CD, digital download; Label: Independent

=== Mixtapes ===
Title	Album details
Your Girl Does Party	Released: May 15, 2012; Format: Digital download; Label: Independent

=== Extended plays ===
Title	Details
Bling Bling Bling!	Released: July 2, 2008; Format: Digital download; Label: Independent
Just Got Paid, Let's Get Laid	Released: June 23, 2009; Format: Digital download, CD (limited edition); Label: Decaydance, Independent
Cash Only	Released: September 7, 2010; Format: Digital download; Label: Independent

=== Singles ===
Title	Year	Album
"Rated X-Mas"	2009	Non-album single
"Stay the Night"	2010	Cash Only
"Catch Me If You Can" (featuring Jeffree Star)	2011	Non-album singles
"Summer Nights" (featuring Christian TV)	2011	Non-album singles
"Drinks on Me"	2012	Your Girl Does Party
"Myspace Pic"	2014	Non-album singles
"When I'm Single" (featuring Wade Martin)	2015	Non-album singles
"Rich Girls" (featuring Caked Up)	2017	Non-album singles
"Make a Milli"	2024	Non-album singles

=== Music videos ===
Title	Year	Director
"Alcohol"	2008	MOTIONarmy
"Just Got Paid, Let's Get Laid"	2009	Robby Starbuck
"Stay the Night"	2010	Robby Starbuck
"Party Like a Millionaire"	2010	Robby Starbuck
"Drinks on Me"	2012	Robby Starbuck
"When I'm Single"	2015	Wade Martin
"Make a Milli"	2024	CC Bryant
"The Weekend”	2024	CC Bryant

=== Guest appearances ===
- Melissa and Allison appear in Breathe Carolina's "Diamonds" music video.
- Former member Dani appeared in Kylie Minogue's "Wow" music video as a backup dancer.
- Melissa appeared in Breathe Carolina's "Hit and Run" music video.
- Melissa and Allison appear in Deuce's "I Came to Party" music video.
- Melissa appeared in Far East Movement's "Ain't Coming Down (Yeah I'm Trippin mix) music video.
- Melissa and Allison appear in Wade Martin's music videos "Make It Bump" and "Get Lit".
- Melissa appeared as a featured artist in Brokencyde's "2009"
