= Scene (subculture) =

Youth subculture

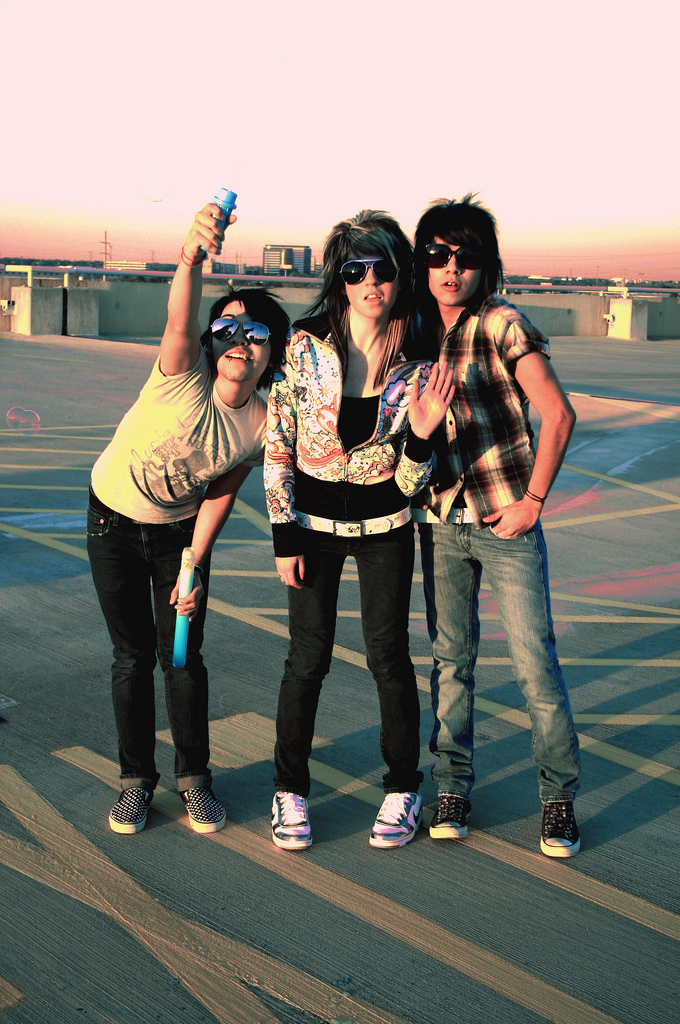
Members of the scene subculture in 2008

The scene subculture is a youth subculture that emerged during the early 2000s in the United States from the pre-existing emo subculture. The subculture became popular with adolescents from the mid-2000s to the early 2010s. Members of the scene subculture are referred to as scene kids, trendies, or scenesters. Scene fashion consists of skinny jeans, bright-colored clothing, and a signature hairstyle consisting of straightened, often conspicuously dyed hair with long bangs covering the forehead. Music genres associated with the scene subculture include metalcore, crunkcore, deathcore, electronic music, and pop punk.

From the mid-2000s to early 2010s, scene fashion gained popularity among teens and the music associated with the subculture achieved commercial success in both the underground and the mainstream. Groups like Bring Me the Horizon, Asking Alexandria, Pierce the Veil, and Metro Station garnered mainstream attention and large audiences while still largely being tied to the scene subculture. In the mid-to-late 2010s, the scene subculture lost popularity; however, since 2019, there have been movements that have given it a revival.

== History ==
=== Origins ===
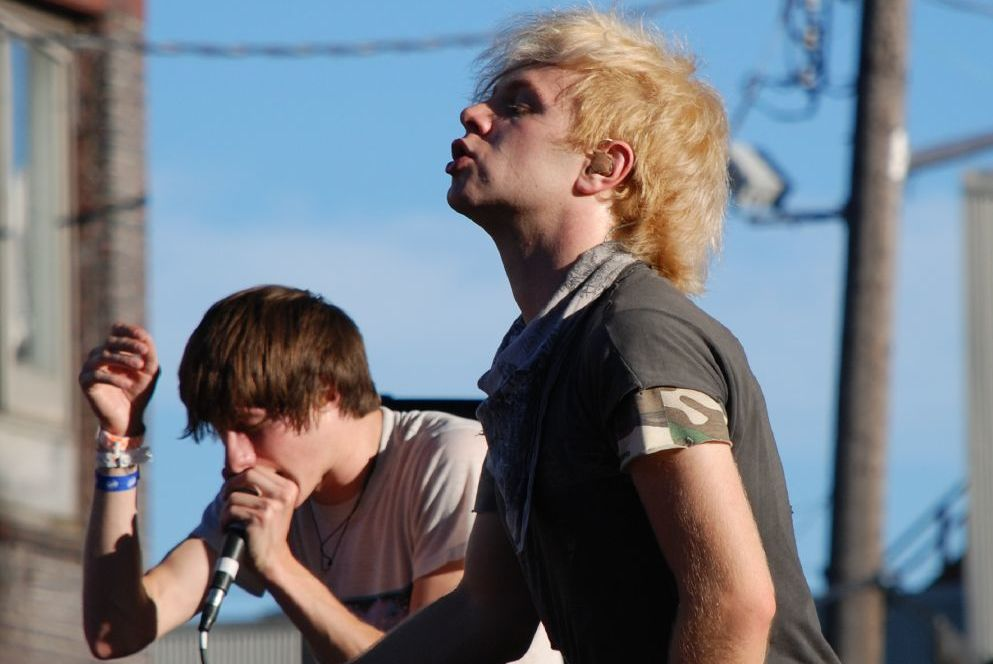
The Blood Brothers were influential on the development of scene fashion.

During the 1990s, many participants in the hardcore punk scene were rebelling against the perceived hyper masculinity of their genre. This resulted in the various androgynous fashion styles of AFI, Poison the Well, American Nightmare and the fashioncore, sass and emo subcultures, all of which were influential upon the origins of scene.

==== Sass ====
Sass developed from the early emo subculture Spock rock, pushing the style's aesthetic more flamboyant, particularly under the influence of gothic rock and post-punk fashion. Sass was the result of a brief subcultural moment that was the intersecting origin point for both the hipster and scene subcultures, at a time when both names were synonymous. The fashion of many sass musicians, notably Johnny Whitney, lead vocalist for the Blood Brothers, were influential upon the development of scene.

==== Fashioncore ====
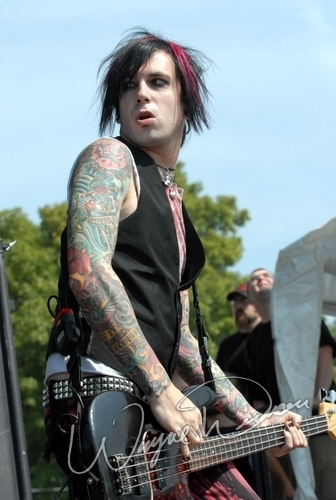
Eighteen Visions' "fashioncore" look was influential upon the development of scene fashion.

Concurrent to sass, fashioncore was a fashion style originated by Orange County metalcore band Eighteen Visions. It used many aspects that would come to define scene fashion, such as eyeliner, tight jeans, collared shirts, straightened hair and white belts. According to MetalSucks writer Finn McKenty, the quintessential scene haircut was invented by Eighteen Visions bassist Javier Van Huss. Huss, himself, had been inspired to create the haircut from seeing a poster of the band Orgy. In Louder Than Hell by Katherine Turman and John Wiederhorn, Ryan Downey states "Javier [Van Huss] really led the charge with crazy hairstyles and pink and blond and blue chunks in their hair".

The style was popularized in the early-2000s through the success of Eighteen Visions, Atreyu and Avenged Sevenfold. It spread to the West Coast of the United States through A Static Lullaby's 2003 tour. On the tour, A Static Lullaby introduced the openers, Long Island's From Autumn to Ashes and New Jersey's Senses Fail, to straightened hair and skinny jeans The term "fashioncore" was then coined by From Autumn to Ashes, when they printed it on merchandise. It was subsequently used to ridicule the style by its critics. OC Weekly stated that "fashioncore" was a "subgenre of metalcore". Loudwire argued against the designation of "fashioncore" as an actual subgenre, instead saying "it was coined as an insult to hardcore kids who started caring more about how they dyed their hair than the actual music."

==== Convergence ====
Scene originated in the early-2000s across the United States from as the meeting point of these separate but intertwined style. The name began being used around 2002, through the term "scene queen", a derogatory term describing attractive, popular women perceived by older hardcore musicians as only being involved in hardcore for the subculture. The New Jersey scene was what ultimately brought the subculture to mainstream attention.

=== Mainstream success ===
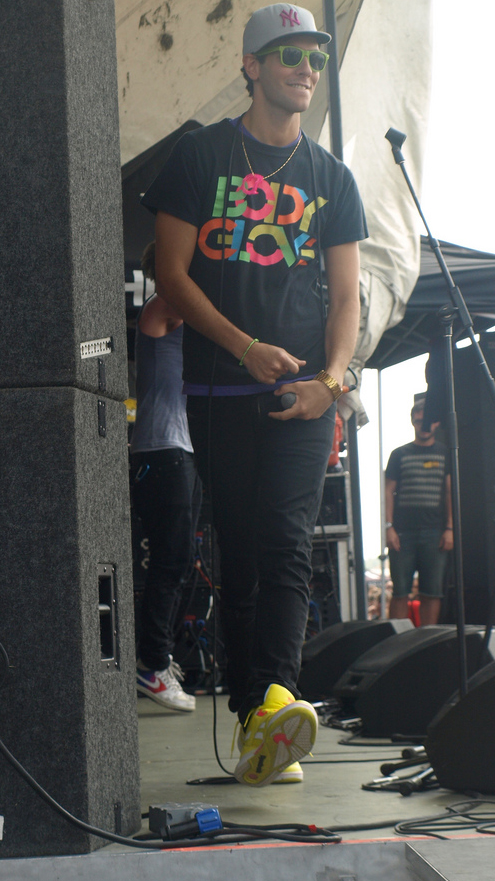
Gabe Saporta helped to define scene fashion by taking influence from rave and Harajuku street fashion.

Scene entered popular culture following the mainstream exposure of the emo subculture, indie pop, pop punk, and hip hop in the mid 2000s. The scene subculture is considered by some to have developed directly from the emo subculture and thus the two are often compared. During the mid 2000s, members of the British and American scene subculture took inspiration from the deathcore music scene. In a 2005 article by Phoenix New Times, writer Chelsea Mueller described the appearance of the band Job for a Cowboy (a band that was deathcore at the time) by writing that the band "may look like scenesters with shaggy emo haircuts and tight pants, and may mock metal greats, but this death-metal band is for real." Mueller described Job for a Cowboy as "five guys in girls' jeans and tight band tee shirts". Another early deathcore group popular among members of the scene subculture is Bring Me the Horizon.

In the following years, the spectrum of scene fashion broadened to include a number of sub-styles taking influence from a wide range of fashion styles. According to PopMatters writer Ethan Stewart, "the most renowned [sub-style of scene] was those who merged the subculture with brightly coloured party fashion", a style he attributed the beginnings of to Cobra Starship vocalist Gabe Saporta and his influence from rave and Harajuku street fashion. He also noted those who took influence from 1980s glam metal fashion, such as the members of Black Veil Brides, Escape the Fate and Falling in Reverse. He attributed the origin of this style to Blessed by a Broken Heart.

Members of the subculture quickly began using MySpace. As the popularity of MySpace grew, the website began to develop some of the earliest internet celebrities, referred to as "scene queens". Notable MySpace scene queens include Audrey Kitching, Jeffree Star and the members of the Millionaires.

The music festival Warped Tour became popular with members of the scene subculture during the 2000s. Artists associated with the subculture would often play at the festival. Bands influenced by crunkcore, electropop and electronic dance music gained popularity among scene kids during the mid to late 2000s, including Cobra Starship and 3OH!3. Blood on the Dance Floor became especially popular, after Jayy Von Monroe joined as lead singer in 2009.

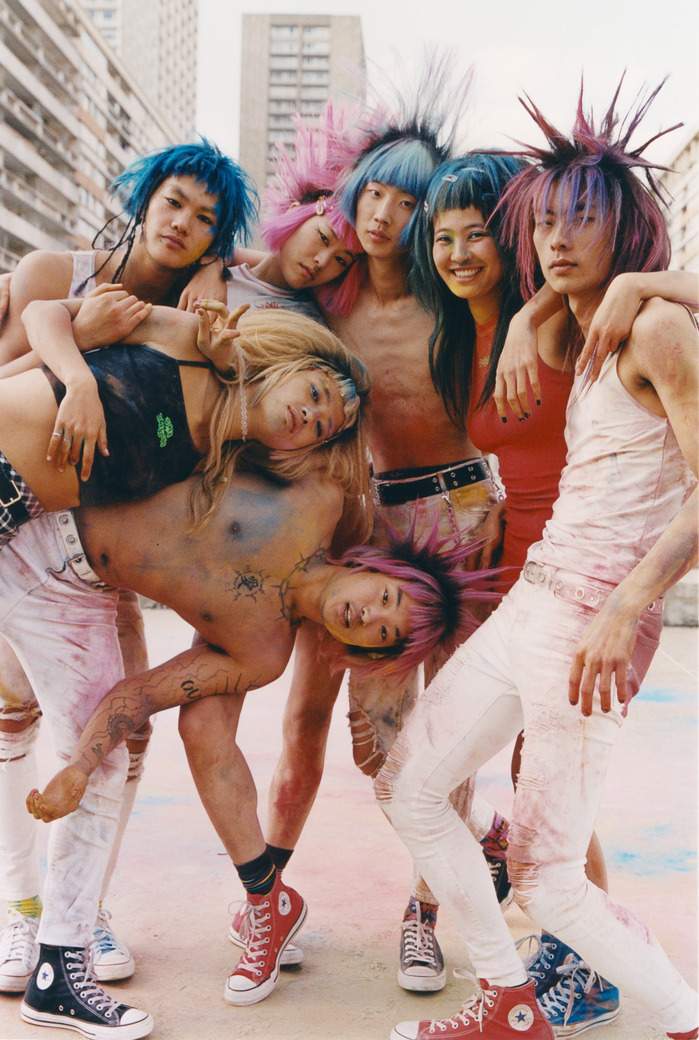
Example of Shamate fashion

During the late 2000s, similar subcultures emerged in Asia and Latin America, including the Shamate in China, the Floggers in Argentina, the Coloridos of Brazil, and the Pokemón in Chile. Like their American counterparts, these scene kids wore brightly colored clothing, androgynous big hair and eyeliner, and identified with the emo pop, indie rock, hip hop, and EDM scene.

=== Decline and revival ===
By around 2014, the subculture had seen a decline in popularity, while also being influential on the fashion and culture of Tumblr, a website which would eventually develop a number of its own scene queens, such as Halsey. Warped Tour had its last show in 2019 after running annually since 1995.

The late 2010s saw the growing popularity of musicians who had begun their careers as members of scene bands, most notably Lil Lotus, Blackbear, Post Malone, Mod Sun and Lil Aaron. Within this movement came the mainstream success of emo rap, itself influenced by scene.

Beginning in 2019, there were several movements promoting the return of the subculture, such as #20ninescene (2019) and the "Rawring 20s" (2020s). Websites like SpaceHey and FriendProject, which retain Myspace's early design, have gained popularity among teenagers, and social media influencers on Instagram and TikTok have begun adopting scene fashion. Around this time, the subculture was also influential on the development of the e-girls and e-boys subculture, and the development of hyperpop. Scene festivals also returned in 2022 with the When We Were Young festival.

== Music ==
Scene music
- Other names: Scenecore, Myspace metalcore, Myspace emo
- Stylistic origins: Hardcore punk, emo, pop-punk, indie rock, fashioncore
- Cultural origins: Late 1990s, mid-early 2000s
- Derivative forms: Crunkcore, neon pop-punk

Scene music is an umbrella term that has been used by several publications to describe the styles of musical artists associated with the scene subculture. Scene music originally had its stylistic roots in punk rock and its offshoots, such as hardcore punk, emo, pop-punk and indie rock. By the mid 2000s, these styles of music had become more accessible to outsiders due to the rise of social media sites such as MySpace, and the "scene" variants of these styles became the "dominant" forms. Despite having roots in punk and hardcore, scene music is its own "all-encompassing" genre that is focused on "showcas[ing] the creativity of any artist or band who chose to break from the norm," according to Alternative Press. OC Weekly stated that the style originated from metalcore band Eighteen Visions's "fashioncore" style.

Many musical artists who began promoting their music on Myspace went on to enjoy sustained commercial success, though by 2011, the initial music scene associated with the platform no longer existed. Loudwire stated that bands that continued to produce music past the scene's peak period eventually "ditched the emo combovers and excessive guyliner" later in their careers. Most of these bands would ultimately change their sounds as well. Some acts associated with the scene subculture include Cute Is What We Aim For, Blood on the Dance Floor, Asking Alexandria, We Came As Romans, The Devil Wears Prada, Paramore, Breathe Carolina, and Taking Back Sunday.

=== Etymology ===
Invisible Oranges expressed the opinion that scene music is a distinct musical "subgenre", while using the term "scenecore" to describe metalcore bands such as Attack Attack!; PopMatters called this style scene metalcore. Loudwire described "scenecore" as being among the "bizarre metalcore subgenres", along with electronicore and crabcore. The publication stated that these sorts of bands "hyper-saturat[ed]" the metalcore scene midway through the decade in a way similar to the inudation of glam metal bands in the 1980s.

Many bands described as "scene" gained popularity through the use of Myspace for promotion, and consequently, many of them may also be considered "Myspace bands", a term that has been used by publications such as Stereogum, Kerrang! and Metal Hammer. Writing for Red Bull, Eli Enis used the term "Myspace metalcore" to refer to artists like Bring Me the Horizon. Alternative Press also stated that the terms "neon punk" and "Myspace-core" have been used interchangeably to label this style. Loudwire stated that bands in genres ranging from deathcore to screamo were grouped together under these labels due to their mutual popularity with "the scene kids of MySpace," as well as goers of the Warped Tour and Mayhem Fest music festivals. The publication cited Bullet for My Valentine, Carnifex, From First to Last, Hollywood Undead, Ice Nine Kills, Panic! at the Disco, Protest the Hero and the Black Dahila Murder as examples of bands commonly categorized this way. In 2007, Village Voice Media also used the term "Myspace emo" to describe a purported offshoot of pop-punk characterized by "bratty, charged-up enthusiasm." American Songwriter, Vice and Paste have also used this term. Buzzfeed used this term to refer to fans of the style themselves. These terms were originally pejoritives, intended to mock the use of the suffix "-core", which has been used to describe genres related to the scene subculture. Ultimate Guitar used the term "mallcore" to refer to this style, including bands such as Escape the Fate and Enter Shikari as examples.

=== Characteristics ===
According to Loudwire, the Used and My Chemical Romance represent the "vulnerable" side of scene music, while acts like Poison the Well and Alexisonfire "delivered a heavier edge" to the style.

According to Invisible Oranges, many scene bands ignore conventional song structure and instead "blast through different genres at a neck-breaking pace." Songs that employ this compositional style may borrow various elements from styles like metalcore, pop-punk, pop music, hip-hop and dubstep. Other elements that may be fused together include electropop, dance music, trance, pop metal and heavy metal. Music journalist Eli Enis stated that modern availability of digital audio workstations like GarageBand made it easier for young musicians to experiment with fusing different styles of music, for example, tracking screams over a dance beat.

One musical subgenre of scene music is crunkcore, characterized by the combination of cultural and musical elements from crunk, screamo, pop, electronic and dance music, the genre often features screamed vocals, hip hop beats, and sexually provocative lyrics. Notable groups in the genre included Brokencyde, Hollywood Undead, 3OH!3 and Millionaires. Another style associated with the culture is neon pop-punk, which emerged in the late 2000s as a style that blended elements of power pop and electronic music with the upbeat, catchy sound of pop-punk. Bands in this genre embraced bright, glistening aesthetics and often featured neon colors in their merch and music videos. Notable groups from that era include All Time Low, the Maine, the Cab, Metro Station, We the Kings, Marianas Trench, Boys Like Girls, The Summer Set, Cobra Starship, Hey Monday, the Academy Is... and Forever the Sickest Kids.

Another apparent hallmark of bands under the scene umbrella is excessively long song titles. Alternative Press stated that some of these titles "could barely fit on the back covers of CDs." The precise origin of this trend is unknown.

=== Reception ===
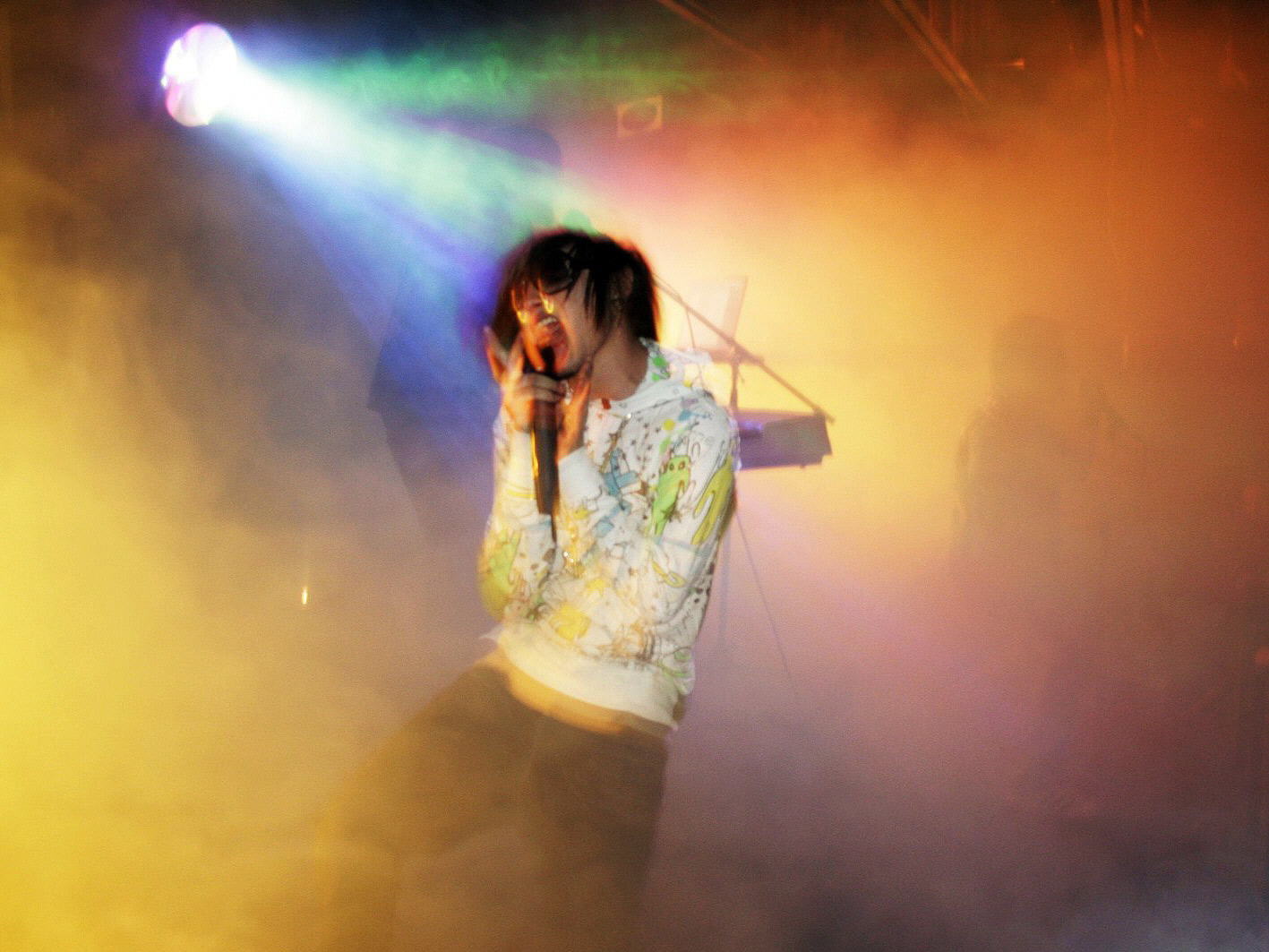
Brokencyde was a popular scene band that received widespread criticism for their sound and fashion.

Crunkcore has received criticism and the genre has been poorly received by music reviewers. The Boston Phoenix has mentioned criticism of the style, saying that "the idea that a handful of kids would remix lowest-common-denominator screamo with crunk beats, misappropriated gangsterisms, and the extreme garishness of emo fashion was sure to incite hate-filled diatribes". Deathcore has been criticized by members of the heavy metal community for its use of breakdowns.

Michael Siebert of Invisible Oranges gave the assessment that the tendency of bands under the scene music umbrella to juxtapose highly dissimilar styles in their songwriting prevented many from achieving critical success:

"The lesson nu-metal should have taught aspiring young musicians is that the combination of disparate genres can be a tricky thing to balance. The best successes of that era found ways to combine their varied interests into moments of rebellious brilliance. What scene music did, though, was go further in a different direction. The often-inspired synthesis of hip-hop and metal from early Slipknot and Korn efforts was traded for extreme variance. Songs blast through different genres at a neck-breaking pace. One moment, it’s pop punk. The next, a breakdown; then, suddenly, dubstep. It rarely ever works, which is why it’s quite difficult to find an album from that era that was met with true critical acclaim."

Despite this, numerous albums considered to be "scene" have achieved platinum-selling status.

== Fashion ==
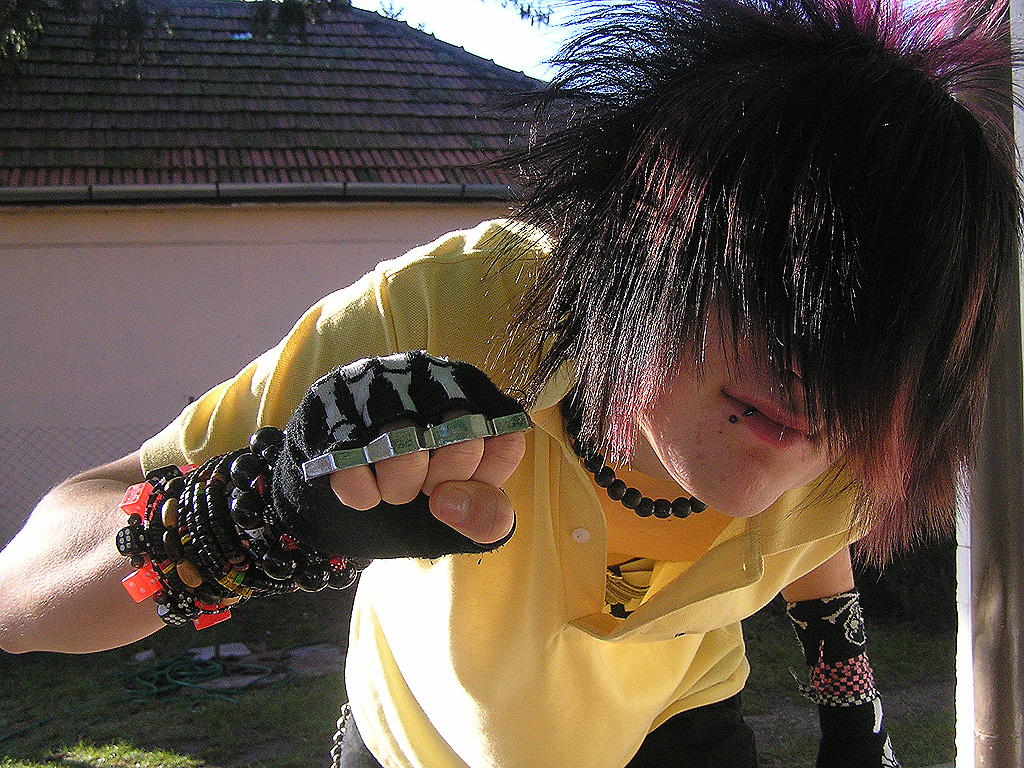
Example of scene fashion

Scene fashion includes bright-colored clothing, skinny jeans, stretched earlobes, sunglasses, piercings, large belt buckles, wristbands, fingerless gloves, eyeliner, hair extensions, and straight, androgynous flat hair with a long fringe covering the forehead and sometimes one or both eyes. Scene people dye their hair colors like blond, pink, red, green, or bright blue. Members of the scene subculture often shop at Hot Topic. According to The Guardian, a scene girl named Eve O'Brien described scene people as "happy emos".

According to a 2008 article by The Sydney Morning Herald, the scene subculture has been criticized for its perceived derivativeness of emo fashion.

== See also ==
- S.C.E.N.E. Music Festival
- E-girls and e-boys
- Emo subculture
- Visual kei
- Mall goth
- Cybergoth
- Clubbing
- List of deathcore bands
- List of emo pop bands
- List of indie rock bands
- List of metalcore bands
- List of pop-punk bands
- List of crunkcore artists
- List of post-hardcore bands
