= Dance or Die (EP) =

Dance or Die EP

EP by Family Force 5
- Released: June 3, 2008
- Genre: Crunk rock, dance
- Length: 10:45
- Label: Gotee

Family Force 5 chronology
Business Up Front/Party in the Back (2006)	Dance or Die EP (2008)	Dance or Die (2008)

Professional ratings
Review scores
Source	Rating
Jesus Freak Hideout	4/5 stars

Dance or Die EP is an EP by the crunk rock band Family Force 5 to give fans a preview of their next album which was released on August 19, 2008.

== Track listing ==
No.	Title	Length
1.	"Dance or Die"	4:10
2.	"Fever"	3:28
3.	"Wake the Dead"	3:07
Total length:		10:45

== Credits ==
- Soul Glow Activatur – vocals, guitar
- Jacob Olds – drums, vocals
- Joshua Olds – bass, vocals
- Nathan Currin – keytar, drum machine, turntables, vocals, tambourine, percussion
- Derek Mount – lead guitar
