= Dance or Die (Family Force 5 album) =

Studio album by Family Force 5
- Released: August 19, 2008
- Genre: Crunkcore, Christian rock, electronica
- Length: 39:59
- Label: Tooth & Nail
- Producer: Joe Baldridge, Solomon "Soul Glow Activatur" Olds

Family Force 5 chronology
Dance or Die EP (2008)	Dance or Die (2008)	Dance or Die with a Vengeance (2009)

Singles from Dance or Die
- 1. "Radiator" Released: 2008; 2. "Dance or Die" Released: 2008

Professional ratings
Review scores
Source	Rating
AbsolutePunk.net	(74%)
AllMusic	3.5/5 stars
Christianity Today	2/5 stars
Cross Rhythms	7/10 stars
Jesus Freak Hideout	4.5/5 stars

Dance or Die is the second studio album from the band Family Force 5. It was produced by Joe Baldridge (tobyMac) and lead vocalist Solomon "Soul Glow Activatur" Olds. The album was released on August 19, 2008 both in stores and via digital distribution. This is the band's second full-length album release. However, it is the band's first release on the Tooth & Nail Records label. The band was previously with Gotee Records. The record was leaked in its entirety on the internet on August 15, 2008. As of December 2009 the album has sold over 100,000 units. Dance or Die won Best Album at the 2008 Rock on Request Awards.

== Genre ==
The album has been labeled as crunkcore, Christian rock, grunge, electronica, synthpop, dance-rock, R&B, urban and hip hop.

== Track listing ==
Album release
No.	Title	Length
1.	"Dance or Die"	4:11
2.	"Get Your Back Off the Wall"	3:15
3.	"Rip It Up"	3:20
4.	"How in the World"	4:37
5.	"Fever"	3:28
6.	"Party Foul"	3:00
7.	"D-I-E 4 Y-O-U"	3:30
8.	"Share It With Me"	3:27
9.	"The First Time"	4:25
10.	"Wake the Dead"	3:07
11.	"Radiator"	3:39

== Dance or Die pre-order package ==
Fans who pre-ordered the album online received the album, a limited edition T-shirt, and a Dance or Die sticker.

Dance or Die sold 17,000 copies in its first week and came in at 30 on the Billboard 200.

== Music videos ==
A video for "Radiator" was released a month after the album. It features the band playing in a club style room with the Dance or Die logo behind them. A video for "Dance or Die" was released in August 2009.

== Video games ==
The song "Radiator" was released as a downloadable track on the Rock Band Network.

== Charts ==
Chart performance for Dance or Die
Chart (2008–2009)	Peak position
New Zealand Albums (RMNZ)	12
US Billboard 200	30
US Top Alternative Albums (Billboard)	8
US Christian Albums (Billboard)	1
