= Dance or Die with a Vengeance =

Remix album by Family Force 5
- Released: May 19, 2009
- Genre: Crunkcore; Christian rock; dance; techno; electronic rock; gangsta rap
- Label: Transparent Media Group
- Producer: Joe Baldridge; Solomon "Soul Glow Activatur" Olds

Family Force 5 chronology
Dance or Die (2008)	Dance or Die with a Vengeance (2009)	Keep the Party Alive EP (2009)

Singles from Dance or Die with a Vengeance
- 1. "The First Time" Released: April 13, 2009; 2. "Get Your Back Off the Wall" Released: May 2009

Professional ratings
Review scores
Source	Rating
Cross Rhythms	8/10 stars
Jesus Freak Hideout	4/5 stars 3.5/5 stars

Dance or Die with a Vengeance is a remix album from the band Family Force 5. The album was released on May 19, 2009 both in stores and via digital distribution. The album debuted at No. 180 on the Billboard 200, No. 15 on the Christian Albums chart and No. 6 on the Dance/Electronic albums chart.

== The album ==
The band debuted the remix album Dance or Die with a Vengeance with remixes by The Secret Handshake ("Dance or Die"), Sean Foreman of 3OH!3 ("Get Your Back Off the Wall"), Danger Radio, Jasen Rauch of Red ("Radiator"), Matt Thiessen of Relient K ("The First Time"), David Crowder of David Crowder Band ("How in the World"), Alex Suarez of Cobra Starship ("How in the World"), Lauren Olds, who is the wife of Soul Glow Activator ("Wake the Dead"), and others. Adam Young of Owl City was a candidate for being one of the remixers of the album but was busy recording his own album, Ocean Eyes.

== Track listing ==
Album release
No.	Title	Length
1.	"Dance or Die" (The Secret Handshake Han Valen Remix)	4:28
2.	"Get Your Back Off the Wall" (3OH!3 Remix)	3:59
3.	"Rip It Up" (The Pragmatic Remix)	3:30
4.	"How in the World" (Suave Suarez Remix)	3:52
5.	"Fever" (Toxic Avenger Remix)	4:55
6.	"Party Foul" (Sami D's UVS Remix)	4:12
7.	"D-I-E 4 Y-O-U" (RAC Mix)	3:50
8.	"Share It with Me" (Smile Future Remix)	3:50
9.	"The First Time" (Matt Thiessen (of Relient K) Remix)	4:31
10.	"Wake the Dead" (Lalipop Remix)	2:55
11.	"Radiator" (Jasen Rauch (of Red) Remix)	2:55
12.	"Ghostride the Whip"	3:35
13.	"Rip It Up" (Croul-Glo-Activaton Version 2009)	2:44
14.	"How in the World" (David Crowder Band Uncredited) (Extra Mix Ver. 2)	3:35

== Charts ==
Chart performance for Dance or Die with a Vengeance
Chart (2009–2010)	Peak position
New Zealand Albums (RMNZ)	27
US Billboard 200	180
US Christian Albums (Billboard)	15
US Top Dance/Electronic Albums (Billboard)	6
