= Business Up Front/Party in the Back =

Studio album by Family Force 5
- Released: March 21, 2006
- Studios: Bridge Street Studio, Franklin, Tennessee; FM^{2}, Franklin, Tennessee
- Genres: Rap metal; funk metal; nu metal
- Length: 41:30
- Labels: Maverick, Gotee
- Producers: Joe Baldridge, Butch Walker, Solomon Olds

Family Force 5 chronology
Family Force 5 (2005)	Business Up Front/Party in the Back (2006)	Dance or Die (2008)

Alternative cover
- Diamond Edition

Singles from Business Up Front/Party in the Back
- 1. "Kountry Gentleman" Released: 2005; 2. "Love Addict" Released: March 23, 2006; 3. "Replace Me" Released: 2006; 4. "Earthquake" Released: 2006; 5. "I Love You To Death (Only On Diamond Edition)" Released: 2007

Professional ratings
Review scores
Source	Rating
AllMusic	3/5 stars
Christianity Today	3/5 stars
Cross Rhythms	(10/10)
Jesus Freak Hideout	4.5/5 stars

Diamond Edition professional ratings
Review scores
Source	Rating
AbsolutePunk.net	(78%)
Cross Rhythms	(10/10)
Jesus Freak Hideout	5/5 stars

Business Up Front/Party in the Back is the debut studio album by American Christian rock band Family Force 5, released on March 21, 2006. It has been notable for putting Family Force 5 into the mainstream. "Love Addict" was a Christian radio hit. A "diamond edition" was released on March 20, 2007, with three additional tracks.

== Track listing ==
All tracks are written by Jacob Olds and Solomon Olds, except where noted.

No.	Title	Writer(s)	Length
1.	"Cadillac Phunque"	Nathan Currin; Jacob Olds; Solomon Olds	3:27
2.	"Kountry Gentleman"		3:23
3.	"X-Girlfriend"		3:38
4.	"Drama Queen"		3:51
5.	"Put Ur Hands Up"		4:20
6.	"Love Addict"	Nathan Currin; Jacob Olds; Solomon Olds	2:52
7.	"Earthquake"		3:05
8.	"Replace Me"	Nathan Currin; Jacob Olds; Solomon Olds	3:35
9.	"Lose Urself"		3:10
10.	"Peachy"		3:46
11.	"Supersonic"		3:07
12.	"Numb"		3:11
Total length:			41:30

Diamond edition
No.	Title	Length
13.	"I Love You to Death"	2:44
14.	"Face Down"	3:52
15.	"Never Let Me Go"	3:10
Total length:		51:18

Vinyl Diamond edition
No.	Title	Writer(s)	Length
16.	"Whatcha Gonna Do with It"		3:35
17.	"Minds Eye" (dc Talk cover)	Toby McKeehan; Michael Tait; Mark Heimermann	2:59
Total length:			57:52

== Credits ==
- Solomon "Soul Glow Activatur" Olds – vocals, guitar, programming, synthesizers
- Jacob "Crouton" Olds – drums, vocals
- Joshua "Fatty" Olds – bass guitar, vocals
- Nathan "Nadaddy" Currin – turntables, percussion, synthesizers
- Brad "20 Cent" Allen – guitars (on tracks 1–7, 9–12)
- Derek "Chap Stique" Mount – guitars on track 8 (replaced Allen)
- Produced by Joe Baldridge and Solomon Olds, except "Put Ur Hands Up", "Earthquake", and "Lose Urself" (Olds, Butch Walker)
- Mixed by Chris Lord-Alge
- Mastered by Leon Zervos
- Recorded at Bridge Street Studio and FM^{2} (Franklin, TN), and The Rental House Studios and Ruby Red Productions (Atlanta, GA)

== Notes ==
- "Kountry Gentleman", "Replace Me", and "Love Addict" were the first singles off the record; in fact, a video for "Kountry Gentleman" was actually released in the summer of 2005, about nine months before the full-length album was released. No video was made for "Replace Me"; the song was sent only to Christian radio. A video was released for "Love Addict" in mid-2006.
- Advance copies of the album did not include "Replace Me"; the song "Earthquake" was instead followed by "Lose Urself", "Peachy", "Supersonic", "Numb", and "Colour of Water", which did not make it onto the final record. Solomon Olds explained that the band's record labels (Maverick and Gotee) only wanted twelve songs for the album and the band thought "Replace Me" was a better song than "Colour of Water".
- The opening track "Cadillac Phunque" is featured in the video game ATV Offroad Fury 4.
- "Kountry Gentleman" was featured in the trailer for the kung-fu film "The Warrior's Way."
- "Love Addict" was released as downloadable content for the music game Rock Band 2."
- "Love Addict" is on the Digital Praise PC game Guitar Praise.
- "Kountry Gentleman" was used in the 2019 Breaking Bad film El Camino.

== Awards ==
In 2007, the album was nominated for a Dove Award for Rock Album of the Year at the 38th GMA Dove Awards.

== Charts ==
Chart (2007)	Peak position
US Top Christian Albums (Billboard)	17
US Heatseekers Albums (Billboard)	12
