= Kountry Gentleman =

Single by Family Force 5

from the album Business Up Front/Party in the Back and the EP Family Force 5
- Released: 2005
- Recorded: 2004–2005
- Studio: Bridge Street Studio, Franklin, Tennessee
- Genre: Nu metal; rap rock
- Length: 3:22
- Label: Maverick; Gotee
- Songwriters: Solomon Olds, Jacob Olds
- Producers: Joe Baldridge, Butch Walker, Solomon Olds

Family Force 5 singles chronology
"Kountry Gentleman" (2005)	"Love Addict" (2006)

Music video
- "Kountry Gentleman" on YouTube

Kountry Gentleman is a song by American Christian rock band Family Force 5. It was released as the first single from their debut studio album Business Up Front/Party in the Back. The song was also featured on their self-titled EP.

== Music video ==
The music video was directed by Kenneth Horstmann. It is also the only Family Force 5 music video to feature original lead guitarist Brad "20 Cent" Allen.

== Track listing ==
CD
No.	Title	Length
1.	"Kountry Gentleman"	3:22

Vinyl
No.	Title	Length
1.	"Kountry Gentleman (Poet Name Life Remix)"	3:47
2.	"Kountry Gentleman"	3:22
3.	"Kountry Gentleman (Instrumental)"	3:47
4.	"Kountry Gentleman (A Cappella)"	3:13

== Personnel ==
- Solomon "Soul Glow Activatur" Olds – vocals, guitar,
- Jacob "Crouton" Olds – drums, vocals
- Joshua "Fatty" Olds – bass guitar, vocals
- Nathan "Nadaddy" Currin – turntables
- Brad "20 Cent" Allen – guitar

== Use in other media ==
The song is featured in the films The Warrior's Way, and El Camino: A Breaking Bad Movie. The song is also featured in the 2007 video game Stuntman: Ignition.
