= Family Force 5 =

American crunkcore group

- From left to right: Joshua, Jacob, Soul Glow, Nathan, Derek

Background information
- Also known as: The Brothers; Ground Noise; The Phamily; FF5
- Origin: Atlanta, Georgia, U.S.
- Genres: Christian rock; crunk rock
- Years active: 2004–2018, 2026–present
- Labels: Curb; Star Song; Word; Maverick; Gotee; Tooth & Nail; Transparent Media Group; III Entertainment; Reanimated
- Members: Solomon Olds (Soul Glow Activatur); Jacob Olds (Crouton); Joshua Olds (Fatty)
- Past members: Brad Allen (20 Cent); Derek Mount (Chapstique); Nathan Currin (Nadaddy); Teddy Boldt (Hollywood)
- Website: ff5music.com

Family Force 5 (formerly known as FF5, the Phamily, Ground Noise and the Brothers) is an American Christian rock band from Atlanta, Georgia. The band was formed in 2004 by brothers Solomon "Soul Glow Activatur" Olds, Joshua "Fatty" Olds, and Jacob "Crouton" Olds along with their two friends, Nathan "Nadaddy" Currin and Brad "20 Cent" Allen, who was later replaced by Derek "Chapstique" Mount. The group has released five studio albums, nine EPs, and two remix albums. They are often noted for their raucous, party-centric personae and eclectic mix of genres, ranging from rap to dance-pop.

In 2018, the remaining two members, Jacob and Joshua Olds, re-branded the group as FF5 and released the EP El Compadre on March 2 of that year. The band played their most recent show on March 17, 2018 before going on hiatus until 2026.

== History ==
=== Formation (1993–2003) ===
Family Force 5 was formed in Atlanta, Georgia, under their original name, The Brothers. Three of the five original members, Solomon ("Soul Glow Activatur") and twins Joshua ("Fatty") and Jacob ("Crouton"), are sons of Jerome Olds, a Christian artist popular in the late 1980s. The Brothers released Fact and Reality in 1994 and RPM in 1995. Both albums were released on Star Song Records and produced by their father.

The group changed their name to "Ground Noise", which they classified as "a really bad version of Third Day". Shortly after, the three brothers added Brad Allen ("20 Cent") and Nathan Currin ("Nadaddy"). They then renamed their group The Phamily.

A decade later, the band signed with Maverick Records, for distribution to the mainstream market before signing to Gotee Records for the Christian market. Under the name "The Phamily", the band sought a dual recording deal to better distribute their music to both the mainstream and Christian markets. According to Solomon Olds, "To me, and pretty much anybody that's under my age, most Christian music is a turnoff. I don't want to be affiliated with that. I want to be affiliated with something that is great music. I feel that Maverick and Gotee together can pull that off." The group was then forced to change their name again, due to copyright issues with Prince's band, The Family.

=== Family Force 5 and mainstream success (2004–2007) ===
On March 21, 2006, the band released their first full-length album Business Up Front/Party in the Back under their new name "Family Force 5", which was an instant hit in both the Christian and mainstream markets spawning several hit singles such as "Kountry Gentleman", "Replace Me", "Love Addict" and "Earthquake". All of these songs, like many others on the album, are heavily focused around the guitar. Their debut album has been both disparaged and praised by Christian and non-Christian critics respectively for not containing overtly Christian content in any of its tracks. In March 2007, their debut album was re-released as Business Up Front/Party in the Back: Diamond Edition, which contains three previously unreleased songs. During this time, Family Force 5 contributed the song "Mind's Eye" for the compilation album Freaked! A Gotee Tribute to DC Talk's Jesus Freak. The band participated in Van's Warped Tour during the summer of 2007. For Christmas, Family Force 5 released a few Christmas-themed audio blogs. They also recorded "Grandma", a cover of "Grandma Got Run Over by a Reindeer". Also a new unreleased song, "Whatcha Gonna Do with It", was added to the Hip Hope Hits: 2008 album. Another previously unreleased song, "Master of Disguise", was posted on YouTube. However, due to mixed fan reaction to the song it was not slated for release at the time.

=== Dance or Die (2008) ===
In June 2008, Family Force 5 released an EP entitled Dance or Die EP to debut three songs from their upcoming album Dance or Die. On August 19, 2008, the full-length album was released, taking on a more club-oriented, electronic dance sound than Business Up Front/Party in the Back with less guitar. The full-length album, Dance or Die, received a favorable review in World Magazine.

Blake Soloman of AbsolutePunk.net had the following to say about the album: "Even though Family Force 5 may be the musical equivalent of mixing Mentos and Coke—lots of build up for something that only ever happens one way—I find myself oddly pleased with Dance or Die."

Dance or Die sold 17,000 copies in its first week and debuted at 30 on the Billboard 200. By the end of January, the album had sold over 50,000 units, and during early 2009, the band embarked on the AP tour from March to May promoting the album and headlining concerts throughout the U.S. In December 2008, the band won the Best Christian Rock Artist, Best Crunk Rock/Rap Artist and Best Rock Album for Dance or Die at the Rock on Request Awards.

=== Remix album and Christmas Pageant (2009) ===
In May 2009, the band debuted their remix album of Dance or Die; Dance or Die with a Vengeance. It featured remixes by The Secret Handshake, 3OH!3, Danger Radio, Jasen Rauch of Red, Matt Thiessen of Relient K, David Crowder of David Crowder Band, Alex Suarez of Cobra Starship, and more. The album debuted at No. 180 on the Billboard 200, No. 15 on the Christian Albums chart and No. 6 on the Dance/Electronic Albums chart.

Around this time, Solomon Olds created a remix of the song "Best Night of Our Lives" by Everyday Sunday.

On September 5, the band unveiled a new song called "Keep the Party Alive" which was featured on an EP, titled Keep the Party Alive EP. The EP was released exclusively at Target to promote the Halloween themed Skelanimals on September 15. Other tracks on the EP include three songs from Dance or Die with a Vengeance, two songs from Dance or Die, and two music videos. Next, The band embarked on their third Dance Rawr Dance Tour, along with Breathe Carolina, Cash Cash, Queens Club, and i-Rival.

On October 6, the band released a Christmas album titled Family Force 5's Christmas Pageant, containing ten tracks including their own version of "My Favorite Things". The album debuted at No. 14 on the US Dance charts.

In mid-November 2009, the band hit the road on the Christmas Pageant Tour. On this tour was House of Heroes, Remedy Drive, and All Left Out. On the tour they performed their versions of Christmas classics as well as their very own originals. On November 30 it was announced by lead singer Soul Glow Activatur's Twitter that Joshua (Fatty) had been admitted to the ICU of a local hospital and that a kidney specialist had been called in after his condition deteriorated. Later it was confirmed that he was suffering from kidney failure and that he was undergoing dialysis treatment. The band at first vowed to continue the current tour they were on, The Christmas Pageant Tour, so as not to disappoint fans. However, as Joshua's condition worsened, the band canceled a few shows, but then made a return for the rest of the tour. Joshua made a full recovery and returned to playing shows.

=== III (2010–2012) ===
In January 2010 the band toured Australia and New Zealand, playing shows for the Parachute Music Festival and its Australian offshoots. In February 2010, they toured with Cobra Starship in the United Kingdom. In March and April 2010, they were part of the lineup of the Rock and Worship Roadshow with Mercy Me, David Crowder Band, Francesca Battistelli, Fee, Remedy Drive, and more. During this time, the band also released their music to the UK market for the first time.

On March 2, 2010, Family Force 5 were confirmed to be playing the UK leg of the traveling festival, Sonisphere. This was the band's first UK festival appearance. The band also announced six UK and Ireland headline dates to coincide with their Sonisphere appearance.

In December 2010 the band did their second annual Christmas Pageant Tour in the United States, with main support from Forever The Sickest Kids. The tour also had a one-off date for a London show; however, this was later cancelled due to weather.

The band confirmed a third studio album, which was tentatively slated for release in mid-2010. They stated that the third album will have more crunk-rock and "rock-and-roll" elements similar to Business Up Front/Party in the Back. The band released a three-song preview EP, entitled III, on April 15, 2011. In an interview with JesusFreakHideout.com, guitarist Chap Stique explained that the new album is tentatively titled III as well. He also mentioned that some of the tracks that may appear on the album are called "Paycheck", "Can You Feel It", "Get on Outta Here", "Not Alone", and "Tank Top", and that the album itself would contain more spiritual themes than the EP. In another interview with Alt Press, Soul Glow Activatur also confirmed that the album will be called III and revealed a new track title, "Crash Down", and claimed that the CD "runs the gamut" from "straight-up electro" to "a little bit of redneckness". Tooth & Nail Records announced that they would be publishing III, and revealed the cover and track list on August 9. The album was released on October 18, 2011. The album has received mixed reviews. Critics have praised the album's musical diversity, while criticizing the quality of the lyrics.

The band did a short spring tour called Tourantula, which ran from April 15 to May 15.

Family Force 5 played on the Warped Tour 2011 from July 26 through August 14.

The band's 2012 tour was called Rise Up, and was scheduled to run from March through September. It was inspired by Fatty's near-fatal experience, and featured a short film by Isaac Deitz called "Vital Sign". The film documented the band's experience during the unexpected illness and how it has affected them long-term.

An extended version of the album III called III.V was announced in April 2012. It was to feature five extra songs, two new ones and three acoustic. Instead, III.V was released as an EP of six songs, two new ones and four acoustic, on May 22, 2012.

=== Reanimated and departure of Soul Glow Activatur (2012–2013) ===
Beginning in November 2012, Soul Glow Activatur began hosting his own radio show "Phenomenon" for Christian Radio Station NGEN Radio every Friday Night at 10 pm. Several new songs have been debuted during the show including "Next Level", "Chainsaw", and title track, "Phenomenon", the latter two have been released as their own EP.

Several photos were posted on February 25, 2013, in which the band was shown recording in Tommy Lee's studio, confirming that the band was in the process of writing and recording a new album.

On May 3, 2013, Family Force 5 released a music video for "Chainsaw" featuring an additional verse from Christian rapper Tedashii; on the same day, the band are released this version of the song as a single.

Reanimated, an album featuring both new songs and remixes of older songs, was released on June 18, 2013. Its reception ranged from mixed to negative.

The band announced on their website on September 23, 2013, that Soul Glow Activatur would be leaving the band to focus on songwriting, remixing, and DJ Phenomenon, but he would still be a behind-the-scenes part of the group. Pictures on the website and Facebook were updated to show the new band lineup, moving Crouton from the drums to lead singer, and adding Teddy "Hollywood" Boldt as the new drummer.

=== Time Stands Still (2014–2015) ===
On April 30, 2014, the band announced they had signed with Word Entertainment for their fourth studio album, set to release in the year. Their single "Let It Be Love" was released along with the news.

On May 23, 2014, Family Force 5 released their first music video from their upcoming album, BZRK. The song features Christian rapper KB. The band announced that the title of the upcoming album would be Time Stands Still, along with its artwork on May 26, 2014. On May 27, 2014, the band released the album for pre-order on iTunes.

The band was part of the 2015 Winter Jam Tour Spectacular in the central and eastern parts of the United States. They were also a part of the Winter Jam Tour 2015 West Coast.

Their remix album, Time Still Stands, was released on November 6, 2015. It features six remixes of songs from the album Time Stands Still, and two new additional songs.

=== Label issues and additional line-up departures (2015–2018) ===
On May 3, 2017, lead guitarist Derek Mount (aka Chapstique) announced that he would be leaving the band to pursue other projects. Shortly after, keyboardist and original member Nathan Currin also parted ways with the group, although no statement has officially been given from either him or the band regarding his departure.

In April 2017, Family Force 5 announced that their fifth album, Audiotorium, was almost complete, but due to label conflicts could not be released yet. The band went on a tour in which they performed the unreleased album live in its entirety at each show.

In January 2018, Teddy Boldt, also known as Hollywood, announced his departure from the band, making the only remaining members Jacob and Joshua Olds.

=== Rebranding, and El Compadre (2018) ===
On January 18, 2018, they released the single "Fire on the Highway" and rebranded as "FF5": a duo consisting of two of the Olds brothers. They released the EP El Compadre on March 2. The band never formally broke up, but they played their most recent show on March 17 of that year.

=== Return to social media and reunion (2026–present) ===
On February 8, 2026, after nearly seven years of inactivity, the band began posting reels on their Instagram account hinting at a possible reunion. They have since renamed the band back to Family Force 5, and have hinted at the possible return of Solomon Olds (Soul Glow Activatur). On February 18, they posted on social media that they would be reuniting for the Vans Warped Tour in Orlando, Florida. The band re-released their most popular songs into a reloaded album onto their Spotify page.

Their Instagram is highly active as of July 2026, where they have released new merchandise, which sold out quickly. There has been a positive response in the community to their reunion, with possible more concerts apart from the Vans Warped Tour.

== Musical style ==
Rapzilla stated that Family Force Five perform a fusion of rock music, dance music, pop music, hip-hop, and crunk "to form an assault on the ears. [...] While listening to FF5 you never know if you are going to be participating in a dance party or raucous rap/rock mosh." The band's lyrics contain Christian themes. AllMusic stated that the band combines heavy metal riffs and comedic lyrics "into a wall of sound that all but obscures the group's Christian outlook."

Family Force 5 has been cited as a crunk rock band, mixing a diverse set of music styles including punk, rap, post-hardcore, R&B, funk, dance, electronica, rap metal and nu metal with positive, party lyrics.

== Other projects ==
The band contributed a song to the Alice in Wonderland soundtrack (titled Almost Alice), called "Topsy Turvy". The song did not make the standard soundtrack, but it is one of three bonus songs on the special Hot Topic edition of the soundtrack. The song premiered on their MySpace page on February 8. It was released with the Almost Alice (Deluxe Version) on iTunes June 1, 2010.

Family Force 5's vocalist, Soul Glow Activator, was featured on the opening track of the 2008 concept album Nervosa by Christian post-hardcore band, Showbread.

"Radiator" and "Love Addict" have been released on the Rock Band network.

"Can You Feel It" was used in a trailer for the 2012 film Battleship.

The band also appeared on the album Punk Goes Pop 3 with their cover version of La Roux's "Bulletproof". The album was released on November 2, 2010.

The band's song "Kountry Gentleman" was used in the advertisements for the movie The Warrior's Way.

On December 8, 2010, Rock Sound gave out a free CD with their magazine containing a new version of "Love Addict" and a demo of their new song "Every Night of the Week". Also in promotion of their new album a clip of "Dang Girl" was posted on their YouTube channel.

On January 25, 2012, they released a new five-song EP titled Junk in the Trunk which included previously unreleased songs and alternate versions of others.

On January 8, 2013, Capital Kings released their self-titled debut album, Capital Kings, featuring Soul Glow Activatur on "The Paradigm".

The band's 2005 song, "Kountry Gentleman", was used in the 2019 film, El Camino: A Breaking Bad Movie.

== Band members ==
Current members

- Solomon “Soul Glow Activatur” Olds – vocals, guitars, synthesizers (2004–2013, 2026–present)
- Jacob "Crouton" Olds – vocals (2004–2018, 2026–present), drums, percussion (2004–2013, 2018, 2026–present)
- Josh "Fatty" Olds – bass, vocals (2004–2018, 2026–present), guitars, synthesizers (2017–2018)

Former members

- Brad "20 Cent" Allen – guitars (2004–2005)
- Nate "Nadaddy" Currin – synthesizers, percussion, vocals (2004–2017)
- Derek "Chapstique" Mount – guitars, vocals (2005–2017)
- Teddy "Hollywood" Boldt – drums, percussion (2013–2018)

== Discography ==
=== Studio albums ===
List of studio albums, with selected chart positions
Title	Details	Peak chart positions		
Title	Details	US	US Christ.	NZ
Business Up Front/Party in the Back	Released: March 21, 2006; Label: Gotee, Maverick; Formats: CD, LP, digital download	—	17	—
Dance or Die	Released: August 19, 2008; Label: Tooth & Nail; Formats: CD, digital download	30	1	12
III	Released: October 18, 2011; Label: Tooth & Nail; Formats: CD, digital download	61	3	—
Time Stands Still	Released: August 5, 2014; Label: Word	30	1	—

=== Christmas albums ===
List of Christmas albums, with selected chart positions
Title	Details	Peak chart positions	
Title	Details	US Christ.	US Dance
Family Force 5 Christmas Pageant	Released: October 6, 2009; Label: Tooth & Nail, Transparent; Formats: CD, digital download	24	11

=== Remix albums ===
List of remix albums, with selected chart positions
Title	Details	Peak chart positions			
Title	Details	US	US Christ.	US Dance	NZ
Dance or Die with a Vengeance	Released: May 19, 2009; Label: Transparent; Formats: CD, digital download	180	15	6	27
Reanimated	Released: June 18, 2013; Label: Capitol; Formats: CD, digital download	—	10	9	—
Time Still Stands	Released: November 6, 2015; Label: Word; Formats: CD, digital download	—	44	—	—

=== EPs ===
- The Phamily EP (2004)
- Family Force 5 EP (2005)
- Business Up Front, Party in the Back Diamond Edition EP (2006)
- Dance or Die EP (2008)
- Keep the Party Alive EP (2009) Target exclusive.
- III EP (2011)
- Junk in the Trunk EP (November 25, 2011)
- III.V EP (May 22, 2012)
- Crank It Like a Chainsaw EP (January 21, 2013)
- FF5 EP (2017) online exclusive
- El Compadre (March 2, 2018)

=== Singles ===
- "Kountry Gentleman" (2005)
- "Love Addict" (2006)
- "Replace Me" (2006)
- "Earthquake" (2006)
- "I Love You To Death" (2007)
- "Radiator" (2008)
- "Dance or Die" (2008)
- "Not Alone" (2011)
- "Get On Outta Here" (2011)
- "Wobble" (2011)
- "Paycheck" (2012)
- "Cray Button" (featuring Lecrae) (2012)
- "Chainsaw" (featuring Tedashii) (2013)
- "Let It Be Love" (2014)
- "BZRK (featuring KB) (2014)
- "Walk on Water" (featuring Melanie Wagner (of Young & Free)) (2015)
- "Hold Your Hand" (2015)
- "Fire on the Highway" (2018)

=== Non-album tracks ===
- "Grandma Got Run Over By A Reindeer"
- "Here Comes Santa Claus"
- "Repeat the Sounding Joy"
- "Every Night of the Week"
- "Love Addict" (2011 demo)

=== Compilation appearances ===
- Hip Hope Hits 2008, 2007 .... "Whatcha Gonna Do with It" [Gotee]
- Freaked!: A Gotee Tribute to dcTalk's "Jesus Freak", 2006 .... "Mind's Eye" [Gotee]
- Almost Alice: Songs Inspired by "Alice in Wonderland" (Hot Topic Edition), 2010 ... "Topsy Turvy"
- Punk Goes Pop 3, 2010 .... "Bulletproof" originally recorded by La Roux
- Jingle Jam, 2010 ... "Here Comes Santa Clause" and "Repeat the Sounding Joy"

== Awards ==
GMA Dove Awards

Year	Award	Result
2007	Rock Album of the Year (Business Up Front/Party in the Back)	Nominated
2010	Christmas Album of the Year (Family Force 5 Christmas Pageant)	Nominated
