= Chainsaw (Family Force 5 song) =

Single by Family Force 5 featuring Tedashii

from the album Reanimated
- Released: May 3, 2013
- Length: 3:12
- Label: Independent
- Songwriters: Tedashii Anderson, Nathan Currin, Derek Mount, Jacob Olds, Joshua Olds, Solomon Olds

Family Force 5 singles chronology
"Cray Button" (2012)	"Chainsaw" (2013)	"Let It Be Love" (2014)

Tedashii singles chronology
"Lord Have Mercy" (2012)	"Chainsaw" (2013)	"Dark Days, Darker Nights" (2014)

Music video
- "Chainsaw" on YouTube

Chainsaw is a song by American Christian rock group Family Force 5, featuring Christian rapper Tedashii, it was released as the only single from their 2013 album "Reanimated".

== Music video ==
A music video for "Chainsaw" was released on May 3, 2013. The video was filmed in Redwood National Park in Northern California.

== Personnel ==
=== Family Force 5 ===
- Solomon "Soul Glow Activatur" Olds
- Jacob "Crouton" Olds
- Joshua "Fatty" Olds
- Nathan "Nadaddy" Currin
- Derek "Chapstique" Mount

=== Additional musicians ===
- Tedashii

== Charts ==
Chart (2013)	Peak position
US Hot Christian Songs (Billboard)	44
