= Dance or Die (band) =

German electronic band

- Also known as: Do or Die North America
- Origin: Berlin, Germany
- Genres: Electronic, dark wave
- Years active: 1988–present
- Labels: Machinery; Polydor; Synthetic Symphony; Out of Line
- Spinoffs: Winterhart; Darkness on Demand
- Members: Andreas Goldacker; Gary Wagner; Falgalas; Chris L.
- Past members: Norri
- Website: dance-or-die.de

Dance or Die is a German electronic band, formed in 1988 by Andreas Goldacker and Gary Wagner in Berlin. Falgalas (born Heiko Duus) joined the band in 1993, first for live touring, later as full member. Chris L. (born Christian Lorenz) joined in 1998, initially for live support. In January 2018, three band members (Wagner, Falgalas and Chris L.) continued the band under the name Darkness on Demand, maintaining the DoD acronym and musical style.

== History ==
The band formed in Berlin, Germany, in 1988 as a duo of Andreas Goldacker (aka A.N.G.O.) and Gary Wagner. The band drew initial influences from both post-punk bands like Joy Division and Bauhaus, as well as electronic groups such as Front 242 and DAF.

Their first mini album, Dance or Die, was the initial release of Berlin-based label Machinery Records. Its title track became one of the most frequently played titles in central and northern Europe. As summarized by Zillo, "in the 1990s [Dance or Die] formed the link between Gothic [rock] and Electro, and were a pioneer at that". They continued their collaboration with Machinery through the label's peak in the mid-1990s.

In 1997, they signed with the Polydor imprint What's Up?! and released one album (Dehumanizer), a single for the album track "Relationshit", and a subsequent EP, Teenagemakeup. The relationship with Polydor ultimately ended because the band's dark electronic sound did not match the label's profile. On Dehumanizer, the band was briefly joined by Norbert Drescher (aka Norri) as drummer. Heiko Duus (aka Falgalas), a member of Nigra Nebula who had previously provided live support for the band, became a fully-credited band member beginning with Dehumanizer.

In 2001, they released the album Schlafendeenergie on Synthetic Symphony in Germany and cross-licensed to Energy Rekords in Sweden. "Schlafende Energie" (literally: sleeping energy) is a term coined by the German television series Raumpatrouille and means an energy reserve.

In 2011, after ten years of relative silence, the band released the album Nostradamnation on Out of Line in Europe and as a limited edition on Metropolis Records in North America. For the album, Christian Lorenz (aka Chris L.) – lead singer for Agonoize who had been live support for the band since 1998 – joined the band as a vocalist.

=== Side projects and transition to Darkness on Demand ===
Nostradamnation was the final release to bear the Dance or Die name. The band continued to tour in the years after the release, including appearances at Wave-Gotik-Treffen, across Europe, and in Mexico.

Meanwhile, band members began to explore various side projects. In December 2014, Wagner released an album with a project named Ruhestätte Schwarz. In 2015, Wagner and Duus began releasing neo-folk and martial music under the name Winterhart. Lorenz continued his work with Agonoize, formed a project named The Sexorcist in 2015, and joined Funker Vogt as vocalist in 2017.

By 2018, three members of the band – Wagner, Duus, and Lorenz – began producing new material but distanced themselves and rebranded from Dance or Die as a result of "some bad experiences with the former producer" of the band. The trio continued the EBM style of Dance or Die under the name Darkness on Demand, which conveniently kept the same "DoD" abbreviation as before. The first release under the new name was Post Stone Age Technology, released in early 2018. Post Stone Age Technology was followed up by Detoxination in 2019, and by the Final Way EP in 2023.

In September 2023, Darkness on Demand released their third album, Digital Outcast, with a pre-release of an AI generated video for the track "Reactor 4."

== Music ==
In 2015, Dance or Die was still described as a "well-known Berlin cult Electro [band]" by the music magazine Sonic Seducer. Their music combines cold techno sounds with a deep voice (vocalist Gary Wagner even sings as guest on other artist's records, as on "Take Some More" by And One) and cyber-themed lyrics about life in the machine age. The albums were thus appropriately named, 3001 for the future, Psychoburbia taking psycho and burb together, while Dehumanizer seems to stand for itself. (Though it may have been named after Black Sabbath's Dehumanizer album, whose song "Black Sabbath" Dance or Die did cover on Psychoburbia.)

== Discography ==
=== Albums ===
- 3001 (1991, Machinery Records)
- Psychoburbia (1992, Machinery Records)
- Everspring (1995, Machinery Records)
- Dehumanizer (1998, What's Up ?! / Polydor)
- Schlafendeenergie (2001, Synthetic Symphony)
- Nostradamnation (2011, Out of Line Music, Metropolis Records)

=== EPs and singles ===
- "Move" (1988, Madcat Records)
- Dance or Die (1990, Machinery Records)
- "Fire" (1991, Machinery Records)
- "Time Zero" (1994, Machinery Records)
- "Minute Man" (1995, Machinery Records)
- "Relationshit" (1997, Polydor Records)
- "Teenagemakeup" (1997, Polydor Records)

=== Compilations ===
- The Best of the 12" Mixes Berlin 89 – New York 93 (1993, Machinery Records) (aka Psychoburbians)
