= And Then There Were None (band) =

American rock and metal band

- Also known as: ATTWN
- Origin: Salem, New Hampshire, United States
- Genres: Indietronica, dance-rock, emo, pop punk, metalcore (early)
- Years active: 2003–2010; 2018
- Labels: Tooth & Nail, 13Star
- Members: Matt Rhoades; Sarah Graziani; Nick Massahos; Ryan Manning
- Past members: Matt McComish; Sean Sweeney; Garret Henderson; Jeff Cheever; Chris Gagne; Derrick Flanagan; Mike Moderski; Dave Jewers; J. Sjostrom; Nick Kane Miskell
- Website: www.andthentherewerenonemusic.com

And Then There Were None is an American rock and metal band from Salem, New Hampshire. They recorded an independent album before releasing their label debut, Who Speaks for Planet Earth?, on Tooth & Nail Records in 2009. The latter album made Billboard's Christian Albums chart.

== History ==
And Then There Were None formed in 2003 as a metalcore band, and toured across the United States in support of their highly acclaimed self-released EP "6,000 tries". The band supposedly chose the name because as they were searching sparknotes.com, the title for the Agatha Christie novel from which the band got their name was situated between Aerosmith and As I Lay Dying. The members of And Then There Were None loved the idea of being situated between those two bands they admired and decided to adopt the name.

In 2007, they went through a transition, from metal to incorporating more electronica elements. New members also joined in that year creating a new working dynamic. Dance music came easily and allowed for more freedom. It also gave them the opportunity to play more light-hearted, uplifting music.

They signed to Tooth & Nail Records in 2008 and released the single "Reinventing Robert Cohn" in January 2009. Their full-length album Who Speaks for Planet Earth? was released February 24 of that year. This album reached No. 16 on the Billboard Christian Albums chart and No. 14 on the Billboard Heatseekers chart. Then in December 2009, the band released an online copy of a remix of "Thank the Watchmaker" in an acoustic version.

They released a cover of the Christmas single "Where Are You Christmas?" on October 29, 2010, and their upcoming single, "Stuttering" (which has already made its way into their concert set list) will be released shortly after.

On July 1, 2011, Tooth & Nail records announced that Matt Rhoades and Sarah Graziani from the band had formed a new dance-pop project called Young London. Young London released two singles, "Let Me Go" and "Celebrity", and released a full-length album on January 10, 2012. Their Instincts EP featured two unreleased And Then There Were None songs recorded as Young London, "Stuttering" and "I Still Dream".

Rhoades and Graziani ended Young London and formed a new wave rock project, Contact, in 2014. Graziani left the project after recording two singles with them, "Fascination Shadow" and "Somewhere", leaving the band a three-piece. Rhoades continues to perform with Contact, releasing the single "Gravekeeper" in 2017.

And Then There Were None reunited in 2019, releasing a new metal-influenced single "Dead 3000" and going on a reunion tour.

== Influences ==
And Then There Were None incorporate techno-pop influences such as Basshunter, and have stated that they were inspired by Cascada. Like many other Tooth & Nail artists, And Then There Were None is often viewed as "essentially a Christian band". However, according to an interview with the band shortly after the release of Who Speaks for Planet Earth?, with the exception of the drummer Ryan Manning, all members are atheist or agnostic. This would explain that although they are not explicitly Christian in their songs, their music does allude to many of their beliefs.

All members are vegetarians and are heavily involved with PETA. They set up tables at their concerts, which inform fans of the organization and their beliefs on animal rights. Matt Rhodes, in speaking about their activism, says that endorsing a cause was an essential part of the punk movement. In referring to animals in particular, Rhodes is also quoted as saying, "Furthermore, the unnecessary killing of animals for food is not only disgusting, but wrong. We all strongly believe in speaking out for animals, and refuse to be silenced to please the general public."

== Members ==
Current

- Matt Rhoades – vocals, programming
- Mike Moderski – bass
- Sean Sweeney – guitars
- Ryan Manning – drums

Former

- Chris Gagne – vocals
- J. Sjostrom – guitar
- Derrick Flanagin – drums
- Nick Kane Miskell – bass
- Jeffrey Michael Cheever – vocals

== Discography ==
Year	Title	Label	Chart peaks		
Year	Title	Label	US	US Heatseekers	US Christian
2005	The Green - EP	Self-Released	—	—	—
2006	The Hope We Forgot Exists	13Star Records	—	—	—
2009	Who Speaks for Planet Earth?	Tooth & Nail Records	—	14	16
2016	Metal EP Coming Soon	Self-Released	—	—	—
