= Crunkcore =

Crunk and post-hardcore music combo

- Other names: Crunk punk; screamo crunk; scrunk
- Stylistic origins: Crunk; post-hardcore; electronic; dance; pop; hip hop; pop screamo; metalcore; rap rock
- Cultural origins: Mid-2000s, Western and Southern United States
- Typical instruments: Sequencer; sampler; synthesizer; vocals; drum machine
- Derivative forms: Hyperpop

Other topics
- List of crunkcore artists; electronicore; emo rap; pop screamo; trap metal; scene (subculture); sass

Crunkcore (also known as crunk punk, screamo crunk, and scrunk) is a musical fusion microgenre characterized by the combination of musical elements from crunk, post-hardcore (particularly pop screamo), heavy metal, pop, electronic and dance music. The genre often features screamed vocals, hip hop beats, and sexually provocative lyrics. The genre developed from members of the scene subculture during the mid-2000s.

== History and characteristics ==
Crunkcore combines the post-hardcore genres of screamo and emo with hip-hop, particularly the Southern hip-hop genre crunk, along with electronic music such as electropop, dance, pop, rock, and the metal genres of nu metal and metalcore. Writer and musician Jessica Hopper claims that Panic! at the Disco's fusion of emo and electronic elements influenced the development of crunkcore in the mid-2000s. Kerrang! noted retrospectively that a mostly online presence through mediums such as Myspace was a major feature of crunkcore. The lyrics of the genres are mostly party-themed, hedonistic, and sexually explicit. Family Force 5 is a lyrical exception; instead, the band melds the sounds of the genre with Christian-themed lyrics.

Hollywood Undead, Brokencyde, and 3OH!3 are credited as the primary artists behind the creation and emergence of crunkcore. The roots of the genre are in the output of the rap rock group Hollywood Undead, but the genre achieved popularity through Brokencyde, who are considered the most responsible for crunkcore's rise. Warped Tour co-creator and CEO Kevin Lyman calls the group 3OH!3 "the real tipping point for scrunk" as "they were the first emo-influenced act to depart from traditional instruments in favor of pre-programmed beats", while still retaining many of the stylistic elements of emo. That group achieved the genre's greatest success, the 2008 single "Don't Trust Me".

The genre declined in the 2010s, although Brokencyde and 3OH!3 continued to record and tour, respectively, for the next few years. Blood on the Dance Floor and Family Force 5 are the most prolific artists in the genre, with a respective eight studio albums and five studio album and nine EPs.

Crunkcore is typically characterized by the use of screamed vocals, although some crunkcore artists do not scream. For example, 3OH!3 do not "incorporate the blood-curdling screams of many scrunk acts". Millionaires and Kesha likewise eschewed the screamed vocals typical for crunkcore but retained the sexually explicit lyrics and thus are still often considered part of the genre.

== Influence ==
Aliya Chaudhury of Kerrang! cites crunkcore along with metalcore and nu metal as the three scenes that especially contributed to the emergence of the hyperpop genre. She writes that Metro Station and Cobra Starship "created exaggerated pop songs that mixed in rock, hip-hop and dance influences", while Breathe Carolina "used heavy electronics to create catchy pop tunes". However, she credits 3OH!3's "ability to parody pop and take it to bewildering extremes", blown-out synths, and modulated vocals, as creating "the main blueprint for hyperpop".

== Culture and criticism ==
The Boston Phoenix has mentioned criticism of the style, saying that "the idea that a handful of kids would remix lowest-common-denominator screamo with crunk beats, misappropriated gangsterisms, and the extreme garishness of emo fashion was sure to incite hate-filled diatribes". Amy Sciarretto of Noisecreep noted that crunkcore is "oft maligned as the nu metal of this generation." The group Brokencyde in particular has been singled out, with John McDonnell of The Guardian reviewing their music unfavorably. AbsolutePunk founder Jason Tate said that the level of backlash against Brokencyde is more than he has seen for any single act in the last ten years. According to Tate, "they're just that bad, and they epitomize everything that music (and human beings) should not be." Brokencyde member Mikl has acknowledged the criticism leveled at them, but stated, "We don't care what people say ... All these critics are trying to bring us down, and yet we're selling a lot of copies of our music and that's because of our dedicated fans." Writer Jessica Hopper also has criticized the group, but acknowledged its appeal to teenagers, stating "brokeNCYDE just completely references anything that might be a contemporary pop culture reference, or anything that a teenage person is into.... You kind of get everything at once." Melissa Ursula Dawn Goldsmith and Anthony J. Fonseca in Hip Hop around the World: An Encyclopedia state that critics of crunkcore consider the style an example of appropriation of African-American culture by white people, especially because most of the prominent crunkcore artists are white.
