= Our Own House (song) =

Single by MisterWives

from the album Our Own House
- Released: 2015
- Recorded: 2014
- Genre: Indie pop
- Length: 3:52
- Label: Photo Finish
- Songwriter(s): Mandy Lee; Martin Terefe
- Producer(s): Bryan Fryzel

MisterWives singles chronology
"Vagabond" (2014)	"Our Own House" (2015)	"Hurricane" (2015)

Music video
- "Our Own House" on YouTube

"Our Own House" is a song performed by American indie pop band MisterWives. It is the opening track on their debut full-length album of the same name and was issued as the album's first single. The song was co-written by lead singer Mandy Lee. It peaked at number 25 on the Billboard rock chart in 2015.

== Critical reception ==
The song has received positive reviews. Alex Bear of idobi Radio described it as "an explosion [of] brilliant colors between chilled-out verses". Garrett Kamps of Billboard and Miles Waymer of Entertainment Weekly both praised the song's disco feel, with the former further complimenting its "Nile Rodgers-style" guitar work; and the latter stating that Lee's vocals result in a "soaring, emotional melody" while positively comparing her sound to Lorde and Gossip.

== Music video ==
The official music video for the song was directed by Andrew Joffe. The music video was filmed entirely at Evergreen Dairy Bar, located in Vincentown, New Jersey.

== Chart positions ==
Chart (2015)	Peak position
France (SNEP)	87
US Rock Songs (Billboard)	25
