= Need (3OH!3 album) =

Studio album by 3OH!3
- Released: August 27, 2021
- Genre: Crunkcore; electropop
- Length: 30:20
- Label: Photo Finish
- Producer: Sean Foreman; Nathaniel Motte

3OH!3 chronology
Night Sports (2016)	Need (2021)

Singles from Need
- 1. "Lonely Machines" Released: November 13, 2020; 2. "I'm So Sad" Released: January 22, 2021; 3. "Last Breath" Released: March 3, 2021; 4. "Vampire's Diet" Released: June 25, 2021

Need is the sixth studio album by American electronic music duo 3OH!3. It was released on August 27, 2021, via Photo Finish Records. The album title and cover is a nod to their second studio album, Want (2008).

== Background and recording ==
After four years since releasing any new music, Night Sports (2016), the duo returned releasing "Lonely Machines" in 2020. During those four years, Nathaniel Motte and Sean Foreman spent time writing and producing for other artists. They returned to Boulder, Colorado, and wrote and recorded the album prior to the COVID-19 pandemic. During the making of the album, they re-signed with Photo Finish Records, who distributed the album when it was released. Describing the album, Foreman stated, "it fits into something that you'd hear on Want. It would be like the Want lost track, but it's like a modernized version of what we do with that." The duo collaborated with 100 gecs, Bert McCracken and Shawn Crahan on the album. They approached Crahan of Slipknot, where he was attending their concert in Iowa with his daughter Gabrielle, who was a fan of 3OH!3. Crahan played drums on the track in honor of his daughter, who died in 2019. During the writing of "I'm So Sad", they reached out to Laura Les, after they were asked by co-writer Benny Blanco if they had heard 100 gecs' music before. They were featured on the song "Lonely Machines". 3OH!3 worked with Bert McCracken through their manager Gabe Apodaca on the track "Vampire's Diet" during the pandemic, sending him the track in late 2020.

== Composition ==
The lead track "Last Breath" was written in early 2020. Lyrically, the song touches on the topic of getting older and how the duo has progressed in their careers, while maintaining "that mentality of being dynamic, funny, and a bit wacko." The third track "Mayne on a Leash" features a Beastie Boys and Eazy-E-influenced style of rapping. The fifth track "Mi Casa" is a song about having fun at a house party and features a saxophone on the song. The seventh track "Skid Marks" is described as a stripped-down slow ballad, while the final track "Lonely Machines" is described as an EDM track. Collaborating with Bert McCracken on "Vampire's Diet", McCracken drew inspiration on his verse from a book he was reading at the time and recorded his parts at his home in Australia.

== Release ==
"Lonely Machines" was released on November 13, 2020, as the lead single from Need. The song features 100 gecs and a music video was released that same day. "I'm So Sad" premiered on KTCL-FM radio on January 21, 2021, and was released as the album's second single the following day. On March 3, 2021, the duo released the album's third single "Last Breath", and features CLOWN of Slipknot on drums. The fourth and final single from the album, "Vampire's Diet" was released on June 25, 2021, featuring Bert McCracken of The Used. On August 27, 2021, their highly anticipated sixth album was officially released.

== Track listing ==
All tracks are written by Sean Foreman and Nathaniel Motte, expect where noted.

No.	Title	Writer(s)	Length
1.	"Last Breath"		2:12
2.	"I'm So Sad"	Sean Foreman; Nathaniel Motte; Benjamin Levin	3:15
3.	"Mayne on a Leash"		3:31
4.	"F.B.D" (Interlude)		0:26
5.	"Mi Casa"		3:34
6.	"Pound Town"	Foreman; Motte; Nate Cyphert	3:02
7.	"Skid Marks"	Foreman; Motte; Cyphert	3:53
8.	"ABCs"		2:11
9.	"Vampire's Diet" (featuring Bert McCracken)	Foreman; Motte; Bert McCracken	2:29
10.	"Taco Tuesday"		3:14
11.	"Lonely Machines" (featuring 100 gecs)	Foreman; Motte; Laura Les	2:28
Total length:			30:20

== Personnel ==
Credits for Need adapted from AllMusic.

3OH!3

- Sean Foreman – composer, lyricist, producer, mixing, mastering, engineering
- Nathaniel Motte – composer, lyricist, producer, mixing, mastering, engineering

Additional musicians

- CLOWN – drums (track 1)
- Bert McCracken – featured artist
- 100 gecs – featured artist, producer (track 11)

== Release history ==
Release dates and formats for Need
Region	Date	Format(s)	Label	Ref.
Various	August 27, 2021	Digital download; streaming	Photo Finish	
