= Mandy Lee (singer) =

American musician and vocalist (born 1992)

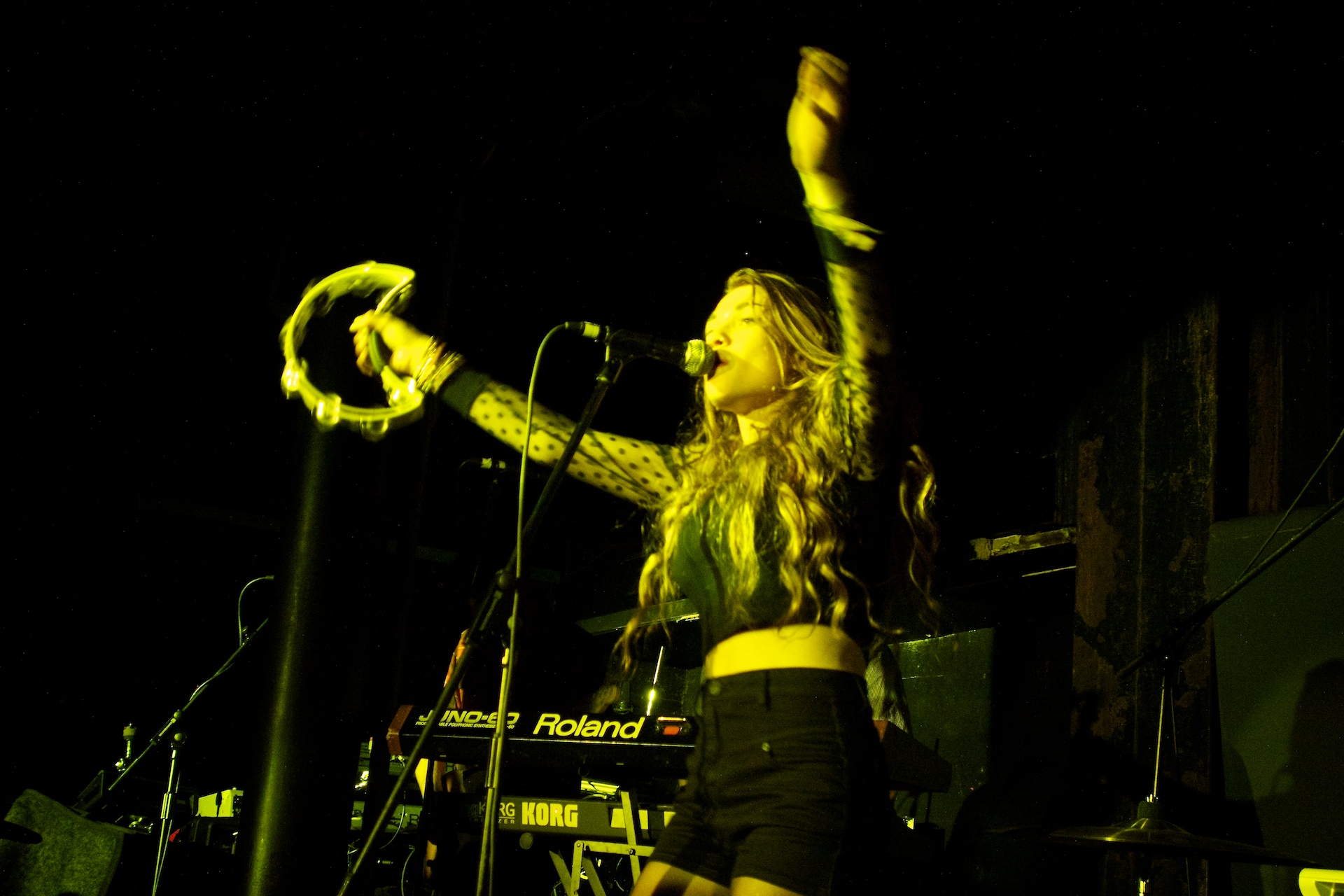
- Lee performing with MisterWives at Madame JoJo's and The Great Escape in Soho; May 8, 2014

Background information
- Born: Amanda Lee Duffy; July 9, 1992 (age 34); Queens, New York City, United States
- Education: Fiorello H. LaGuardia High School
- Genres: Indie pop, pop rock, dance, synth-pop, indie rock
- Occupation: Musician
- Instrument: Vocals
- Member of: MisterWives

Amanda Lee Duffy (born July 9, 1992), known professionally as Mandy Lee, is an American musician, known as the vocalist of American indie pop band MisterWives. She later began a solo project as Cherry Bomb in 2026.

== Early life ==
Lee was born and raised in Queens, New York. Her mother is of Haitian descent. She attended LaGuardia High School in the Upper West Side, where she became classically trained in opera.

== Music career ==
=== MisterWives ===
Lee met future bassist William Hehir in 2013 when they both showed up to perform at a party for 1980s cover bands. Drummer Etienne Bowler was added shortly later, and the three core members of the band named themselves MisterWives, which is a play on the Mormon term "sister wife". Marc Campbell, Jesse Blum, and Mike Murphy later joined as the remaining members of the group.

The band played their first show at Canal Room in February 2013, and were quickly signed on by Photo Finish Records. They released the EP Reflections, and albums Our Own House (2015) and Connect the Dots (2017). They later signed to Fueled by Ramen, releasing Superbloom and it's live performance titled The Live Dream, both in 2020.

In late 2021, Fueled by Ramen dropped the band. The band then released new singles under their own label, Resilient Little Records. They released the album Nosebleeds (2023), and its deluxe version Nosebleeds: Encore (2024), under the label.

MisterWives announced a hiatus starting in 2024, but Lee has confirmed the band is not finished.

=== Cherry Bomb ===
In 2026, Lee began releasing new music under the alias of Cherry Bomb. She stated in interviews that she had been creating music for the project during her time with MisterWives, as well as during the hiatus. Cherry Bomb made her solo festival debut in September 2026 at All Things Go Music Festival in New York City.

Lee's debut solo album, The Pursuit of Pleasure, was released on November 13, 2026. A release show was held at the Moroccan Lounge, Los Angeles on November 18, 2026.

=== Artistry and inspirations ===
Lee has cited a number of artists for inspiration in both her work in MisterWives and solo work, including Gwen Stefani, Madonna, and Robyn. Lee collaborates often with friends, including Matty Vogel and Jason Suwito.

=== Collaborations ===
Lee did a cover of "Midnight City" by M83 with The Knocks, and a cover of "Stay" with Boyce Avenue. She collaborated with lovelytheband for the song "Buzz Cut", and with a number of artists for Nosebleeds: Encore.

== Personal life ==
During the early days of the band, Lee moved in with her fellow band members in an apartment in New York City.

Lee and fellow member of MisterWives Etienne Bowler had a nine-year romantic relationship, culminating in marriage in 2018. The pair later divorced in 2020. Her relationship with Bowler greatly influenced the Superbloom and Nosebleeds albums.

Like most of the other members of MisterWives, Lee is a vegan. She is also a feminist.

Lee currently lives in Los Angeles.

== Discography ==
=== With MisterWives ===
==== Albums ====
- Our Own House (2015)
- Connect the Dots (2017)
- Superbloom (2020)
- Nosebleeds (2023)

=== As Cherry Bomb ===
==== Albums ====
- The Pursuit of Pleasure (2026)

==== Singles ====
- "Never Be Me (M★therf★cker)"
- "Digital Girl"
- "You Oughta Know" (cover)
- "Sorry You're Not Sorry"
- "Myriad Reflector"
- "Crash!"
