= Lonely Machines =

Single by 3OH!3 featuring 100 Gecs

from the album Need
- Released: November 13, 2020
- Genre: EDM
- Length: 2:28
- Label: Photo Finish
- Songwriters: Nathaniel Motte; Sean Foreman; Laura Les
- Producers: 3OH!3; 100 Gecs

3OH!3 singles chronology
"Freak Your Mind" (2016)	"Lonely Machines" (2020)	"I'm So Sad" (2021)

100 Gecs singles chronology
"Hand Crushed by a Mallet" (2020)	"Lonely Machines" (2020)	"Sympathy 4 the Grinch" (2020)

Music video
- "Lonely Machines" on YouTube

"Lonely Machines" is a song by American electronic music duo 3OH!3, featuring 100 Gecs. It was released on November 13, 2020, as the lead single from their sixth studio album, Need. It is the duo's first single in four years since their last release in 2016, Night Sports.

== Background ==
After four years without releasing new music, the group returned in November 2020, posting a teaser of their new single "Lonely Machines", featuring 100 Gecs. Prior to the release, the group got in touch with founder of Photo Finish Records, Matt Galle and signed with the label again since parting ways with them in 2014, which motivated them into releasing the single. Sean Foreman of 3OH!3 said of the collaboration, "It was effortless, unthought and most of all, FUN. We just had a blast creating this Frankenstein of a tune, which at some point we sent to 100 Gecs and they brought it to a whole other level."

== Composition ==
The duo were writing another single from the album "I'm So Sad", when Benny Blanco, who worked with 3OH!3 in the past, asked them if they had listened to 100 Gecs. Ultimately, they reached out to Laura Les of 100 gecs first, which then moved quickly from there. Before Les was reached out to by the duo, she stated in a 2019 interview that she had been a fan of their music and was an influence to 100 gecs' music. It was written by Nathaniel Motte, Sean Foreman and Laura Les, right before the COVID-19 pandemic. Lyrically, the song features a callback to the line "Tell your boyfriend if he says he's got beef / That I'm a vegetarian and I ain't fucking scared of him" in 3OH!3's 2008 single "Don't Trust Me".

== Critical reception ==
Wall of Sound stated that the song "is cheeky, fun and EDM as fuck anthem, taking you back to when their biggest song 'Don't Trust Me' was all over the radio. There's an old-school 8-bit sound as the song kicks off which you don't hear anymore... as for the rest of the track, well, it's definitely a throwback to their 2008 album Want. Derrick Rossignol of Uproxx remarked, "The electronic tune opens with lyrics that brings back feelings of 3OH!3's heyday: 'You tell your boyfriend if he still got beef / That over time, it's gonna give him heart disease.' 100 Gecs' Laura Les also offers a distorted verse." Jason Brow of Hollywood Life described it as "an explosive electro firework of a track." James Crowley of Atwood Magazine stated, "The electronic squeals and charged up synth beat sounds like it could've been a b-side of Want, but the callbacks to 'Don't Trust Me' and Les' verse indicate that this is a band that can still be a serious contender in 2020."

== Music video ==
The music video for "Lonely Machines" premiered on November 13, 2020. The video was directed by Weston Allen and spent eight hours filming it. It was shot at Burbank Studios. Sean Foreman spoke about the concept of the video, stating, "I think especially with this song, it didn't speak to having this narrative component to it. And we really leaned into his creative vision. A lot of the scenarios [in the video] were exactly what we thrive on, which is just being in a room, dressed up ridiculous with a prop and just saying like, 'All right, let's just figure out what we're doing here.' It's borderline improvisational. It's like controlled chaos."

== Personnel ==
Credits for "Lonely Machines" adapted from AllMusic.

- Sean Foreman – vocals, composer, lyricist, producer, mixing, mastering, engineering
- Nathaniel Motte – vocals, composer, lyricist, producer, mixing, mastering, engineering
- Laura Les – vocals, composer, lyricist, producer
- Dylan Brady – vocals, producer

== Release history ==
Release dates and formats for "Lonely Machines"
Region	Date	Format(s)	Label	Ref.
Various	November 13, 2020	Digital download; streaming	Photo Finish	
