= Reflections (MisterWives song) =

Single by MisterWives

from the album Reflections and Our Own House
- Released: 2014
- Genre: Indie pop; disco
- Length: 3:06
- Label: Photo Finish
- Songwriter(s): Mandy Lee
- Producer(s): Bryan Fryzel

MisterWives singles chronology
"Reflections" (2014)	"Vagabond" (2014)

Music video
- "Reflections" on YouTube

"Reflections" is the debut single from American indie pop band MisterWives. It initially appeared on the band's debut EP of the same name and was later added to their debut studio album Our Own House. Written by lead singer Mandy Lee, the song peaked at #13 on the Billboard rock chart in 2015.

== Critical reception ==
Garrett Kamps of Billboard praised the song and referred to it as a "heavenly mash-up of Weezer and the Bee Gees".

== Live performances ==
MisterWives performed an acoustic version of "Reflections" on the MTV series Buzzworthy Live on March 12, 2014. The band went on to perform the song on Big Morning Buzz Live on November 4, 2014; Late Night with Seth Meyers on February 23, 2015; and Last Call with Carson Daly on March 20, 2015.

== Music video ==
The official music video for the song was directed by Andrew Joffe. The video was shot at Bryn Mawr College in Bryn Mawr, PA. Many of the shots are in Bryn Mawr's Taylor Hall, including an exterior of the Senior Steps. Other shots include the exteriors of both College Hall and Rockefeller Hall, Rhoads dining hall, a lecture hall in College Hall, Senior Row, and the basement of Taylor or, what is known to students as, "The Chamber of Secrets".

== Chart positions ==
=== Weekly charts ===
Chart (2014–15)	Peak position
US Alternative Airplay (Billboard)	31
US Hot Rock & Alternative Songs (Billboard)	13

=== Year-end charts ===
Chart (2015)	Position
US Hot Rock Songs (Billboard)	53
