= Brick and mortar (disambiguation) =

Brick and mortar refers to a physical presence of an organization or business in a building.

Brick and mortar may also refer to:

- Bricks and mortar, literally a means of building construction
- Bricks and Mortar, the 2019 American Horse of the Year
- Brick and Mortar (band), New Jersey–based drum and bass duo
- "Bricks and Mortar", a track on the album In This Light and on This Evening by the band Editors
- "Bricks and Mortar", a track on the album In the City by The Jam
- "Bricks and Mortar", an episode of The Wind in the Willows
