= Waiting for the Dawn =

Waiting for the Dawn may refer to:

- Waiting for the Dawn (Kotipelto album)
- Waiting for the Dawn (The Mowgli's album)
- Waiting for the Dawn (book), a political treatise written by Huang Zongxi (1610–1695)
