= Reflections (EP) =

EP by MisterWives
- Released: January 7, 2014
- Genre: Indie pop
- Length: 19:53
- Label: Photo Finish
- Producer: Frequency

MisterWives chronology
Reflections (2014)	Our Own House (2015)

Singles from Reflections
- 1. "Reflections" Released: 2014; 2. "Vagabond" Released: 2014

Reflections is the debut extended play by American indie pop band MisterWives, released digitally on January 7, 2014 via Photo Finish Records. It peaked at #84 on the Billboard 200. All tracks except "Twisted Tongue" and "Kings and Queens" would later appear on the band's debut full-length album Our Own House.

Two singles were released from the album: "Reflections" and "Vagabond". "Reflections" was the highest-charting single from the album, peaking at #13 on the Billboard rock chart in 2014.

== Critical reception ==
Reflections received critical acclaim, with several people comparing the album's sound to the work of The Lumineers. Nick Nelson of The Concordian rated it 5 out of 5 stars and proclaimed that the band had started an "alternative revolution"; while Timothy Monger of AllMusic stated that the album was "a shimmering blend of [...] upbeat pop". Alyson Stokes of idobi Radio rated the album 8 out of 10 stars and suggested that listeners could listen to the album's tracks without growing tired of them; as well as calling the band itself "genreless".

== Track listing ==
All tracks are written by Mandy Lee.

No.	Title	Length
1.	"Twisted Tongue"	3:22
2.	"Reflections"	3:09
3.	"Coffins"	3:10
4.	"Kings and Queens"	3:33
5.	"Imagination Infatuation"	3:33
6.	"Vagabond"	3:06
Total length:		19:53

== Chart positions ==
Chart (2014)	Peak position
US Billboard 200	84
US Top Modern Rock/Alternative Albums (Billboard)	24
US Top Rock Albums (Billboard)	30
