= Matt Galle =

American music executive

- Born: April 13, 1978 (age 48); Norwood, Massachusetts
- Education: Bentley College; Suffolk University
- Occupations: Music industry executive Talent agent Entrepreneur
- Years active: 1999 -- present
- Employer(s): Founder, Photo Finish Records Founder; Bamboozle Festival; Agent, CAA
- Awards: Billboard 40 under 40, Power 100, Touring Power Players, Indie Power Players

Matt Galle (pronounced gal• ee) is an American music industry executive. He is the founder of Photo Finish Records, a New York-city based independent label, and an agent at CAA. He was previously a senior agent at Paradigm Talent Agency.

== Early life and education ==
Galle was born and raised in Norwood, Massachusetts. His father, Donald, worked in finance and his mother, Judith, was a real estate agent. He was interested in music and the music business, and as a teenager, he went to punk, hardcore, and hip-hop shows.

At his father's urging, he enrolled at Bentley College, a school noted for its finance programs. He majored in accounting, but, bored by the curriculum, he transferred to Suffolk University, where he majored in marketing. He graduated with a degree in marketing in 2001.

== Career ==
=== MassConcerts, the Kenmore Agency, Ellis Industries, The Bamboozle ===
Galle had friends who were musicians, and in high school he went to local venues to see them perform. As the bands became more successful, drawing bigger crowds, Galle sought out larger spaces in non-traditional venues such as churches and community halls to stage their concerts. In college, he toured with his friend's bands as a road manager, roadie, and merchandise seller while continuing to set up and promote concerts in the Boston area. The shows came to the attention of John Peters of MassConcerts, who offered Galle a job. Galle subsequently co-produced shows with Peters throughout New England. In 2001 and 2002 he programmed MassConcert's annual SkateFest, a three-day event at the Worcester Palladium that featured indie rock, punk, and hardcore bands on two stages as well as skating ramps outside the facility.

In 2000, with his friend, Matt Pike, he founded The Kenmore Agency, a booking agency. It was financed by MassConcerts. His first clients included Piebald, Taking Back Sunday, and My Chemical Romance.

In 2003, he moved to New York to partner with Andrew Ellis at Ellis Industries. At Eliis, he signed Boys Like Girls, Hellogoodbye, Metro Station, Saosin and Recover. In 2003, Galle and Ellis partnered with John D’Esposito to develop The Bamboozle, an annual multi-day music festival in New Jersey. In 2007, Live Nation bought 51% of The Bamboozle.

=== Photo Finish Records, IDJ, Paradigm, CAA ===
In 2005 Galle began managing songwriter/producer Matt Squire. In 2006, while at Ellis Industries, he founded Photo Finish Records, an independent label based in New York City, intending to sign the bands he discovered and becoming more involved in their development. The self-titled Envy on the Coast EP was the first Photo Finish release.

Galle signed 3OH!3 to Photo Finish in 2006. Two singles from the band's second album, Want were hits in North America, England, Australia and New Zealand

Galle remained at Ellis Industries while running Photo Finish. As the back office responsibilities increased. Galle found the day-to-day business of running the agency tedious and in 2008 he and Ellis decided to sell or close the agency. The agency was acquired by Paradigm, where Galle became an agent.

In 2012, as the label's releases exceeded 10 million in sales, Galle brought Photo Finish to IDJ, where he also served as SVP of A&R. He was named to the Billboard "40 under 40" list the following year. In 2016, frustrated with the major label system, Galle—who had signed the Mowgli's, Marian Hill, and Misterwives to Photo Finish -- entered into a partnership with Caroline Records and Photo Finish became a fully independent label. Then 38, he was again named to the Billboard "40 Under 40".

At Paradigm, Galle's artist roster included fun., Austin Mahone, Shawn Mendes, Halsey, Janet Jackson, T-Pain, and JoJo Siwa, among others. He also represented Bruno Mars and Kesha; the tours he booked early in their careers were later acknowledged as key factors in their development. Photo Finish had success with artists including Marian Hill and Shaed. In 2019 he appeared on the Billboard "Power 100", and in 2020 Billboard named him to both the "Power 100" and the "Indie Power Players" list.

Galle joined CAA's Music Touring Division in June 2021. In 2025, Billboard named him to their "Touring Power Players" list.
