= Superbloom (MisterWives album) =

2020 studio album by MisterWives

Studio album by MisterWives
- Released: July 24, 2020
- Genre: Indie pop
- Length: 61:15
- Label: Fueled by Ramen

MisterWives chronology
Mini Bloom (2019)	Superbloom (2020)	Nosebleeds (2023)

Singles from Superbloom
- 1. "Rock Bottom" Released: May 20, 2020; 2. "Superbloom" Released: May 20, 2020; 3. "Decide to Be Happy" Released: May 20, 2020; 4. "3 Small Words" Released: May 20, 2020

Superbloom is the third studio album by American indie pop band MisterWives, released July 24, 2020 via Fueled by Ramen. The album did not chart on the Billboard 200, but it peaked at #78 on the Billboard Album Sales chart and #48 on the Current Album Sales chart. The title track has over 85 million streams on Spotify.

In a 2020 interview with Paper Magazine, MisterWives front woman Mandy Lee says the album "unfolds my journey of finding a superbloom within the barren desert and the needed juxtaposition of the two in order to grow" later elaborating that the desert refers to her eight year relationship with the drummer for the band, Etienne Bowler. The split was announced 2 months prior to the release of the album. The album clearly describes the journey Lee faced during her relationship and the journey she faced after.

Superbloom was preceded by the release of Mini Bloom, the prequel to the album. Mini Bloom included 5 songs off of the follow-up project. The songs included "Coming Up For Air", "Find My Way Home", "Stories", "Whywhywhy", and "The End". MisterWives debuted the collection of songs in 2019 on the first leg of The Bandito Tour, where they were the supporting act for headliners Twenty One Pilots.

On May 20, 2020, four singles were released ahead of Superbloom's release: "Rock Bottom", "Superbloom", "Decide to Be Happy" and "3 Small Words".

== Track listing ==
No.	Title	Writer(s)	Length
1.	"The End"	Hayden Coplen; Landon Jacobs; Mandy Lee; Jason Suwito	3:14
2.	"Ghost"	Dan Armbruster; Etienne Bowler; Marc Campbell; Mandy Lee	3:22
3.	"Whywhywhy"		3:20
4.	"Alone"	Hayden Coplen; Landon Jacobs; Mandy Lee; Jason Suwito	3:14
5.	"Stories"	Mandy Lee; Tim Pagnotta; Brian Phillips; Whitney Phillips	2:52
6.	"Valentine's Day"	Hayden Coplen; Landon Jacobs; Mandy Lee; Jason Suwito	4:26
7.	"Over the Rainbow"	Mandy Lee; Paul Phamous; Alex Salibian	2:56
8.	"It's My Turn"	Kristine Flaherty; Mandy Lee; Tim Pagnotta; Brian Phillips	3:14
9.	"Find My Way Home"	Etienne Bowler; Marc Campbell; William Hehir; Mandy Lee	2:38
10.	"7-2"	Etienne Bowler; Mandy Lee	2:56
11.	"Rock Bottom"	Mandy Lee; Louis Schoorl; Cal Shapiro	3:10
12.	"Coming Up for Air"	Landon Jacobs; Mandy Lee; Jason Suwito	3:12
13.	"Oxygen"	Kristine Flaherty; Mandy Lee; Dylan William	3:18
14.	"Running in Place"	Mandy Lee; Paul Phamous; Alex Salibian	3:02
15.	"Decide to be Happy"	Etienne Bowler; Mandy Lee; Frans Mernick; Adam Palin	3:27
16.	"Love Me True"	Etienne Bowler; Mandy Lee; Frans Mernick; Adam Palin	3:16
17.	"3 Small Words"	Etienne Bowler; Marc Campbell; Mandy Lee	3:13
18.	"Muse"	Etienne Bowler; Mandy Lee; Paul Phamous; Alex Salibian; Dylan William	2:52
19.	"Superbloom"	Ben Darwish; Mandy Lee; Frans Mernick; Cal Shapiro	3:33
Total length:			61:15

== Chart positions ==
Chart (2020)	Peak position
US Album Sales (Billboard)	78
US Current Album Sales (Billboard)	48
