= Elliot Lee (musician) =

English singer-songwriter

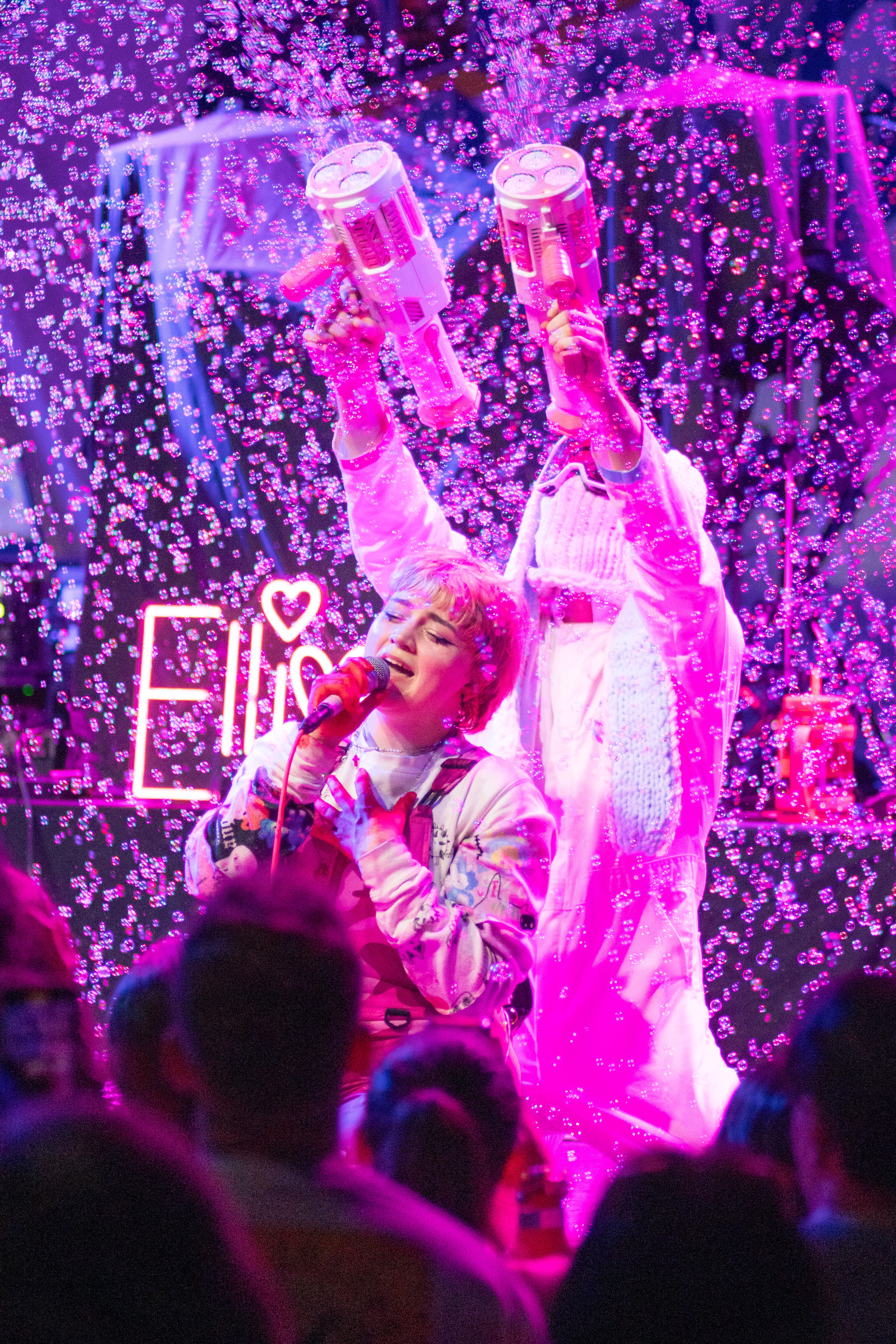
- Elliot in Brooklyn (2024)

Background information
- Born: January 26, 1997 (age 29); Spokane, Washington
- Genres: alternative-rock; pop-rock; bubblegum pop; nightcore
- Occupations: Singer; songwriter; producer
- Instruments: Vocals; Ukulele; Piano; Bass
- Years active: 2018–present
- Label: Photo Finish Records
- Website: www.elliotlee.com

Elliot Lee (born 1997) is a singer, songwriter, and producer based in New York City. They have toured with notable bands including Joywave, Waterparks, and Meet Me at the Altar.

== Background ==
Lee signed with Photo Finish Records in February 2020.

As of January 2024, they have released over 30 singles and their music has been added to well-known playlists such as New Music Friday, Indie Pop, and Bedroom.

Lee is non-binary, and has autism and attention deficit hyperactivity disorder. As of June 2022, they reside in Brooklyn.

== Discography ==
=== Extended plays ===
==== Self-Published ====
Title	Released
So It Won't Kill Us	December 6, 2018
Pink (Freak)	February 14, 2020

==== Photo Finish Records ====
Title	Released
GoodBadUgly	June 30, 2020
can i sleep in ur bed	February 26, 2021
Drama Queen	May 28, 2021
Queen of Nothing	July 16, 2021
Pink (Freak) (feat. Girli)	January 7, 2022
54321	June 29, 2022
Weird	September 23, 2022
Pink (Freak)	December 16, 2022
Sicko (Nightcore)	March 10, 2023
Eels for Brains	April 21, 2023
Easy To Be You	June 9, 2023
Alive, Not Well	November 17, 2023

=== Singles ===
Title	Year	EP
Cruel	2018	Non-album single
SRY ILY	2018	Non-album single
Earthworms	2018	Non-album single
Sleepwalking	2018	Non-album single
TV Head	2018	Non-album single
Sick Mind	2018	Non-album single
Set Her On Fire	2018	So It Won't Kill Us
Spirited Away	2018	So It Won't Kill Us
Mirror	2019	Non-album single
Updside Down	2020	Pink (Freak)
Dirt	2020	Pink (Freak)
Pink (Freak)	2020	Pink (Freak)
Dancing Queen	2020	Non-album single
GoodBadUgly	2020	GoodBadUgly
My Favorite Things	2020	Non-album single
can i sleep in ur bed	2021	can i sleep in ur bed
Rubies	2021	Drama Queen
Drama Queen	2021	Drama Queen
LaLa Land	2021	Queen of Nothing
Queen of Nothing	2021	Queen of Nothing
Airplanes (feat. Letdown)	2022	Non-album single
Mess Boy	2022	Weird
54321	2022	Weird
Weird	2022	Weird
Little Drummer Boy	2022	Non-album single
Pink (Freak) – Girli Remix	2022	Pink (Freak)
Sicko (feat. Paycheck and TIMMS)	2023	Non-album single
Treat Me Better (feat. Eel Smiles)	2023	Treat Me Better (feat. Eel Smiles)
Fun	2023	Easy To Be You
Easy To Be You	2023	Easy To Be You
Boogieman	2023	Non-album single
Alive, Not Well	2023	Alive, Not Well

=== Albums ===
In December 2023, Lee released their debut studio album, Primordial Archive.
