= Nosebleeds (album) =

2023 studio album by MisterWives

Studio album by MisterWives
- Released: July 14, 2023
- Genres: Indie pop, Alternative rock, Dance-pop
- Length: 42:45
- Label: Photo Finish

MisterWives chronology
Superbloom (2020)	Nosebleeds (2023)

Singles from Nosebleeds
- 1. "Out of Your Mind" Released: March 30, 2023; 2. "Nosebleeds" Released: July 1, 2023; 3. "Ultraviolet" Released: June 9, 2023

Singles from Nosebleeds: Encore
- 1. "Organized Chaos" Released: May 10, 2024; 2. "Other Side (featuring Charlotte Sands)" Released: June 7, 2024

Professional ratings
Review scores
Source	Rating
Allmusic	4.5/5 stars

Nosebleeds is the fourth studio album by American indie pop band MisterWives, released July 14, 2023, via Photo Finish Records. Nosebleeds was the first album released by MisterWives after the exit of trumpeter Jesse Blum and being dropped by their label Fueled by Ramen.

A deluxe edition named Nosebleeds: Encore was released on July 26, 2024. This album reworked all tracks, introduced 15 guest features and two new tracks, "Vultures" and "Organized Chaos".

== Track listing ==
Nosebleeds track listing
No.	Title	Writer(s)	Length
1.	"Out of Your Mind"	Etienne Bowler; Lyndsey Gunnulfsen; Mandy Lee; Sean Van Vleet; Jason Suwito	2:37
2.	"Dagger"	Dylan Bauld; Etienne Bowler; Mike Kamerman; Mandy Lee	3:09
3.	"Nosebleeds"	Dylan Bauld; Kristine Flaherty; Mandy Lee	3:03
4.	"All the Same"	Etienne Bowler; Marc Campbell; Mike Kamerman; Mandy Lee; Sport Murphy	3:20
5.	"Sideways"	Etienne Bowler; Mandy Lee; Whitney Phillips; Cal Shapiro	2:44
6.	"Trigger Pull"	Hayden Coplen; Landon Jacobs; Mandy Lee; Jason Suwito	3:25
7.	"Too Late"	Etienne Bowler; Marc Campbell; William Hehir; Mandy Lee; Sport Murphy	2:38
8.	"Silver Lining"	Etienne Bowler; Mandy Lee; Cal Shapiro	1:27
9.	"Trip Around the Sun"	Etienne Bowler; Mandy Lee; Aidan Rodriguez; Cal Shapiro	3:02
10.	"Flower Moon"	Etienne Bowler; Mandy Lee; Cal Shapiro	3:35
11.	"Broken Glass"	Dylan Bauld; Mandy Lee; Morgan Nagler	3:04
12.	"Other Side"	Etienne Bowler; Mike Kamerman; Mandy Lee	3:17
13.	"End of My Rope"	Mandy Lee; Jason Suwito; Sean Van Vleet	3:53
14.	"Ultraviolet"	Mandy Lee; Jason Suwito; Sean Van Vleet	3:26
Total length:			42:43

== Nosebleeds: Encore ==
On July 26, 2024 MisterWives released Nosebleeds: Encore, a deluxe edition album. The album reworked every track of the original, with 15 new features and 2 new tracks "Vultures" and "Organized Chaos".

=== Disc 1 ===
No.	Title	Writer(s)	Length
1.	"Vultures (featuring PVRIS)"	Etienne Bowler; Mandy Lee; Mike Kamerman	2:58
2.	"Out of Your Mind (featuring Against the Current)"		2:37
3.	"Dagger (featuring Meet Me @ The Altar)"	Dylan Bauld; Etienne Bowler; Mike Kamerman; Mandy Lee	3:09
4.	"Nosebleeds (featuring Taylor Acorn)"	Dylan Bauld; Kristine Flaherty; Mandy Lee	3:03
5.	"All The Same (featuring Moody Joody)"	Etienne Bowler; Marc Campbell; Mike Kamerman; Mandy Lee; Sport Murphy	3:20
6.	"Sideways (featuring Meg Smith)"	Etienne Bowler; Mandy Lee; Whitney Phillips; Cal Shapiro	2:44
7.	"Trigger Pull (featuring Cloudy June)"	Hayden Coplen; Landon Jacobs; Mandy Lee; Jason Suwito	3:25
8.	"Too Late (featuring Lindsey Stirling)"	Etienne Bowler; Marc Campbell; William Hehir; Mandy Lee; Sport Murphy	2:38
9.	"Silver Lining (Extended Version)"	Etienne Bowler; Mandy Lee; Cal Shapiro	2:27
10.	"Trip Around The Sun (featuring Pom Pom Squad)"	Etienne Bowler; Mandy Lee; Aidan Rodriguez; Cal Shapiro	3:02
11.	"Flower Moon (featuring Alice Merton)"	Etienne Bowler; Mandy Lee; Cal Shapiro	3:35
12.	"Broken Glass (featuring Juliana Madrid)"	Dylan Bauld; Mandy Lee; Morgan Nagler	3:04
13.	"Other Side (featuring Charlotte Sands)"	Etienne Bowler; Mike Kamerman; Mandy Lee	3:17
14.	"End of My Rope (featuring Betty Who)"	Mandy Lee; Jason Suwito; Sean Van Vleet	3:53
15.	"End of My Rope (The Aces Remix)"	Mandy Lee; Jason Suwito; Sean Van Vleet	3:53
16.	"Ultraviolet (featuring Vérité)"	Mandy Lee; Jason Suwito; Sean Van Vleet	3:26
17.	"Organized Chaos"	Etienne Bowler; Mandy Lee; Michael Kamerman; Zoe Giosa-Hirsch	2:55
Total length:			48:56

=== Disc 2 ===
No.	Title	Writer(s)	Length
1.	"Out Of Your Mind"	Etienne Bowler; Lyndsey Gunnulfsen; Mandy Lee; Sean Van Vleet; Jason Suwito	2:37
2.	"Dagger"	Dylan Bauld; Etienne Bowler; Mike Kamerman; Mandy Lee	3:09
3.	"Nosebleeds"	Dylan Bauld; Kristine Flaherty; Mandy Lee	3:03
4.	"All The Same"	Etienne Bowler; Marc Campbell; Mike Kamerman; Mandy Lee; Sport Murphy	3:20
5.	"Sideways"	Etienne Bowler; Mandy Lee; Whitney Phillips; Cal Shapiro	2:44
6.	"Trigger Pull"	Hayden Coplen; Landon Jacobs; Mandy Lee; Jason Suwito	3:25
7.	"Too Late"	Etienne Bowler; Marc Campbell; William Hehir; Mandy Lee; Sport Murphy	2:38
8.	"Silver Lining"	Etienne Bowler; Mandy Lee; Cal Shapiro	1:27
9.	"Trip Around The Sun"	Etienne Bowler; Mandy Lee; Aidan Rodriguez; Cal Shapiro	3:02
10.	"Flower Moon"	Etienne Bowler; Mandy Lee; Cal Shapiro	3:35
11.	"Broken Glass"	Dylan Bauld; Mandy Lee; Morgan Nagler	3:04
12.	"Other Side"	Etienne Bowler; Mike Kamerman; Mandy Lee	3:17
13.	"End Of My Rope"	Mandy Lee; Jason Suwito; Sean Van Vleet	3:53
14.	"Ultraviolet"	Mandy Lee; Jason Suwito; Sean Van Vleet	3:26

== Music videos ==
Music videos were released for "Out of Your Mind", "Nosebleeds", and "Ultraviolet". Every other track got a visualizer on the band's YouTube channel. "Out of Your Mind" and "Ultraviolet" were directed by Matty Vogel, with "Nosebleeds" being directed by Jax Anderson.

"Vultures" received a music video, also directed by Vogel.
