= Connect the Dots (album) =

2017 studio album by MisterWives

Studio album by MisterWives
- Released: May 19, 2017
- Studios: Rubyred Productions (California); DB Studios (New York)
- Genres: Indie pop; alternative dance
- Length: 42:43; 45:05 (physical release)
- Labels: Photo Finish; Republic
- Producers: Butch Walker; Etienne Bowler

MisterWives chronology
Our Own House (2015)	Connect the Dots (2017)	Mini Bloom (2019)

Singles from Connect the Dots
- 1. "Machine" Released: February 17, 2017; 2. "Oh Love" Released: March 30, 2017; 3. "Drummer Boy" Released: April 20, 2017; 4. "Coloring Outside the Lines" Released: May 12, 2017

Connect the Dots is the second studio album by American indie pop band MisterWives, released on May 19, 2017 through Republic Records. The album serves as a follow-up to the band's debut studio album, Our Own House (2015). It was produced by Butch Walker and Etienne Bowler.

== Background ==
After extensive touring in support of their debut studio album, Our Own House (2015), MisterWives began writing and recording their second studio album with producers Butch Walker and Etienne Bowler. The band confirmed that their second album was "finally complete" on December 17, 2016. The band released the single "Machine" on February 17, 2017. The following week, on February 24, the band officially announced Connect the Dots, revealing its track listing, album art cover, and release date.

The CD and vinyl releases of the album are over two minutes longer than the digital release, containing extended outros on the songs "Drummer Boy", "Revolution", "Coloring Outside the Lines", "Band Camp" and "Oh Love". "Only Human" also has a shorter outro, being five seconds shorter than the digital release. Singer Mandy Lee stated in a Reddit post that the band "wanted to connect each track" on the physical version of the album with "hidden songs and sounds that helped tie together each moment to fit the theme of the record".

== Promotion ==
Connect the Dots was preceded by its lead single "Machine", which was released for digital download and streaming on February 17, 2017. On March 30, the band released another single, titled "Oh Love". A third single, "Drummer Boy", was released on April 20.

MisterWives toured as support on Panic! at the Disco's Death of a Bachelor tour in North America from February 14 to April 15, 2017. They also had a Connect the Dots tour, starting September 2017 and ending in 2018, with support from Vinyl Theatre and Smallpools.

== Track listing ==
All tracks are written by Mandy Lee, except where noted.

No.	Title	Writer(s)	Length
1.	"Machine"	Lee, Etienne Bowler	3:30
2.	"Chasing This"		4:00
3.	"Only Human"		3:45
4.	"Drummer Boy"		4:25
5.	"Revolution"		4:19
6.	"My Brother"		3:58
7.	"Out of Tune Piano"	Lee, Bowler	4:29
8.	"Band Camp"	Lee, Bowler, Marc Campbell	2:56
9.	"Let the Light In"	Lee, Bowler	5:08
10.	"Coloring Outside the Lines"	Lee, Campbell	4:33
11.	"Oh Love"		4:02
Total length:			45:05

== Personnel ==
Adapted credits from the liner notes of Connect the Dots.

MisterWives

- Mandy Lee – lead vocals, composer
- William Hehir – bass guitar, gang vocals
- Marc Campbell – lead guitar, gang vocals
- Jesse Blum – keyboards, synthesizer, piano, gang vocals

Additional personnel

- Butch Walker – producer, programming, recording engineer, synthesizer, keyboards, gang vocals
- Etienne Bowler – producer, drums, percussion, programming, synthesizer, gang vocals
- Todd Stopera – recording engineer
- Neal Avron – mixing engineer

Artwork

- Matt Burnette-Lemon – package production
- Mary Ellen Matthews – photography
- Joe Spix – art direction and design
- Viktoriya Tsoy – design

== Charts ==
Chart (2017)	Peak position
US Billboard 200	124
US Top Rock Albums (Billboard)	26
