= MisterWives =

American indie pop band

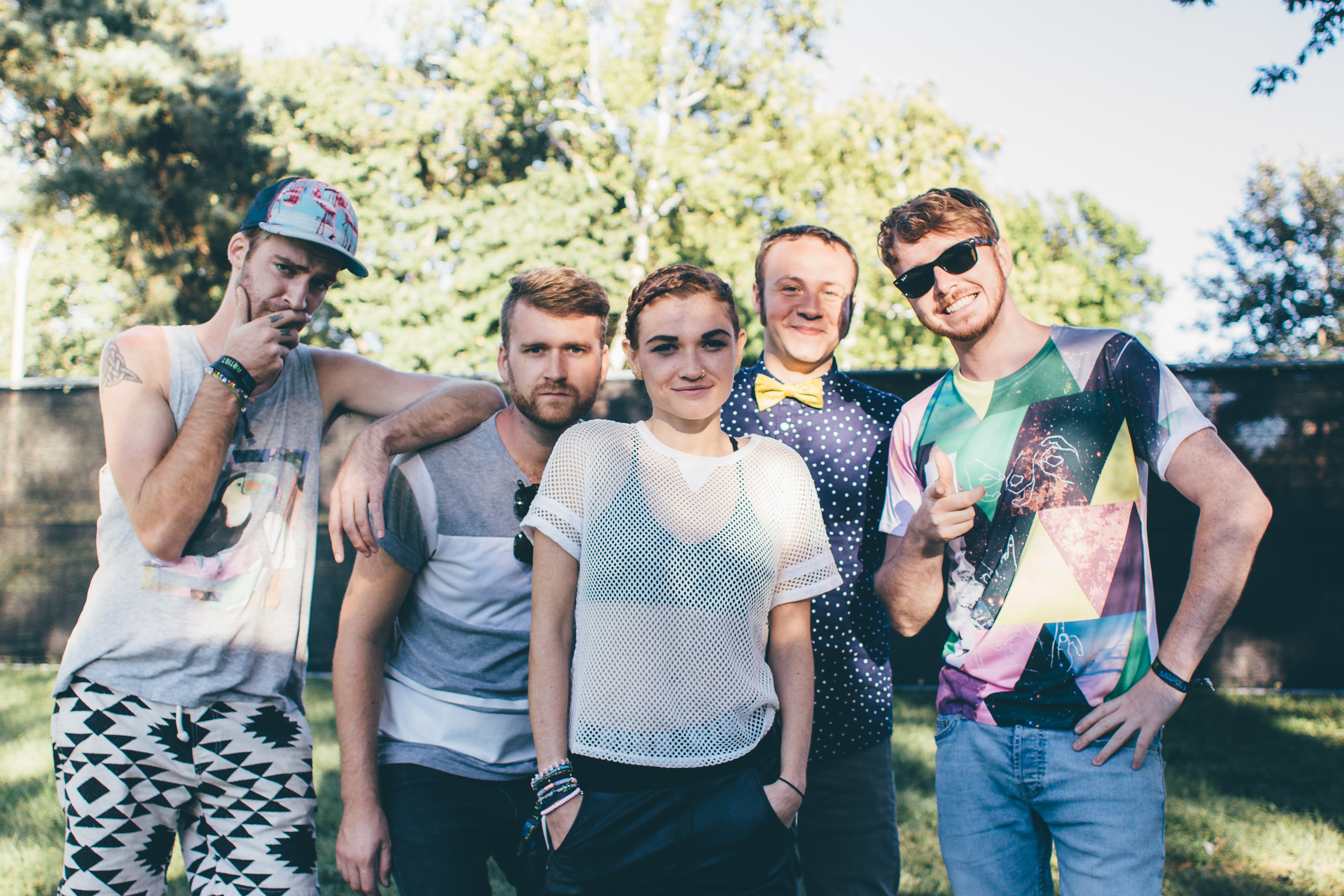
- MisterWives in 2014

Background information
- Origin: New York City, U.S.
- Genres: Indie pop; pop; alternative dance; pop rock
- Years active: 2012–present
- Labels: Resilient Little Records; Photo Finish Records; Fueled by Ramen
- Members: Mandy Lee; William Hehir; Etienne Bowler; Marc Campbell; Mike Murphy
- Past members: Jesse Blum
- Website: misterwives.com

MisterWives are an American indie pop band based in New York City, consisting of lead singer Mandy Lee, drummer and percussionist Etienne Bowler, bass guitarist William Hehir, guitarist Marc Campbell, and keyboardist and saxophonist Mike Murphy.

MisterWives formed in 2012, releasing their debut album Our Own House in January 2015. They released three subsequent albums, Connect the Dots (2017), Superbloom (2020), and Nosebleeds (2023). The band took a hiatus after the fourth album, with Lee beginning a solo project known as Cherry Bomb.

== History ==
=== Formation ===
MisterWives was formed in late 2012 when lead singer Mandy Lee wanted an '80s cover band for her birthday party. She partnered with fellow musicians Etienne Bowler and William Hehir. Lee met Hehir through a mutual friend, and was introduced to Bowler a short time later. At the time, the two had been working at restaurants just a block apart in Manhattan. Eventually the band would expand to its current set-up of five members by bringing Bowler's friends Blum and Campbell (not including the band's saxophonist Mike Murphy), and play its first show as 'MisterWives' (a gender-flipped play on the term sister wives, suggesting polyandry as opposed to polygyny) on February 1, 2013 at the Canal Room in New York City.

=== Early career ===
The day after playing the Canal Room, the band was signed to Photo Finish Records. They would spend the better part of that year on tour and making their first EP. The group began touring with Half Moon Run in October 2013 that ended with a performance at the CMJ Music Marathon. This was shortly followed by a six-week tour with American Authors and The Royal Concept. All the while, the group prepared songs for their debut EP, Reflections.

On December 24, 2013, MisterWives released a trap remix of "Coffins" with the Pegboard Nerds under Monstercat.

=== Reflections EP ===
The band released Reflections on January 7, 2014. The EP has 6 songs, including the title track, which was iTunes' free Single of the Week for the week of January 6. Music Engineer Neal Avron was brought in to mix the EP while Frequency produced "Reflections". The EP was met with rave reviews and has sold over 20,000 copies. Alter the Press' Victoria Mier gave the album a 5/5 saying "Simply put, MisterWives is quite incredible and certainly has both the capacity and the talent to take over the indie-pop world." Nick Krenn of EarBuddy.net wrote "All listeners hunting for more depth from current pop music will want to hear Reflections". The music blog Pigeons and Planes said about one of the tracks from the EP: "MisterWives has only been in existence since 2012, but you would never know that by listening to the expertly written and masterfully produced "Coffins". Reflections sold over 6,000 copies by the end of 2014.

In July 2014, "Vagabond" was made the opening theme of the MTV Teen Drama Finding Carter. Then the band opened for Twenty One Pilots as part of the "Vessel" tour. They would later go on to open for them again on the Banditø world tour. They saw more notoriety in the media, being boasted by MTV Buzzworthy as the "next golden children of pop". The band also performed on VH1's Big Morning Buzz and ABC's Jimmy Kimmel Live.

=== Our Own House ===
In January 2015, the group announced a February 24 release date for their debut album, Our Own House. The reveal coincided with the announcement of their 2015 tour of the same name. In February of that year, the band was featured in Kia Motors' web series Rediscovered, as they covered the Hall & Oates song "Out of Touch" before John Oates made a surprise visit in the studio. MisterWives performed at the 2015 edition of Boston Calling Music Festival, as well as many other major music festivals including Lollapalooza, Outside Lands, Hangout Fest, LouFest, and Austin City Limits. They then embarked on their "Scrapbook Tour", to critical acclaim, with one critic going as far as calling them the "best live band in America".

=== Connect the Dots and Superbloom ===
On December 17, 2016, the band posted on its official Facebook page to announce: "our second record is finally complete". On February 14, 2017, MisterWives announced via Facebook that their new single, "Machine", from their second album, would be available on February 17. On February 24, MisterWives announced via their Twitter page that the album, entitled Connect the Dots, would be released on May 19. From February 24 to April 15, 2017, MisterWives toured with Panic! At the Disco on their Death of a Bachelor Tour.

Then they had a summer "MisterWives Band Camp Tour" through June and ended July 1 in Denver. They also released two singles: "Oh Love" on March 30, 2017 and "Drummer Boy" on April 20, 2017, via their YouTube channel in accordance with Vevo. And on September 21, they began their 'Connect the Dots' tour with bands Vinyl Theatre and Smallpools, which ran until April, 2018.

MisterWives toured the remainder of April and into May through their Let The Light In tour. Then they toured with Thirty Seconds To Mars alongside WALK THE MOON and Joywave on the Monolith Tour, from June to July. The band played festivals throughout the rest of the year, where Lee and Bowler were wedded in August, and began work on their third studio album in early 2019.

On July 30, 2019, the band posted the video for their single "whywhywhy". This was their first release after being signed to Fueled By Ramen. The band announced their "No Place Like Home Tour" which began in November 2019. On November 8, 2019, the band released an EP titled Mini Bloom, which included 5 new songs.

On May 18, 2020, the band posted on Instagram that Lee and Bowler had separated, but that the band would stay together and continue to make music and tour. The full 19-song album Superbloom, which included tracks from the previous EP, was released on July 24, 2020.

On December 12, 2020, the band gave a special performance of Superbloom presented on Moment House entitled SUPERBLOOM: The Live Dream.

On August 31, 2021, the band announced the departure of Jesse Blum.

Later in 2021, Fueled by Ramen dropped MisterWives from their lineup, forcing the band to go independent again. They released several non-album singles under their new independent imprint Resilient Little Records throughout 2021 and 2022.

=== Nosebleeds ===
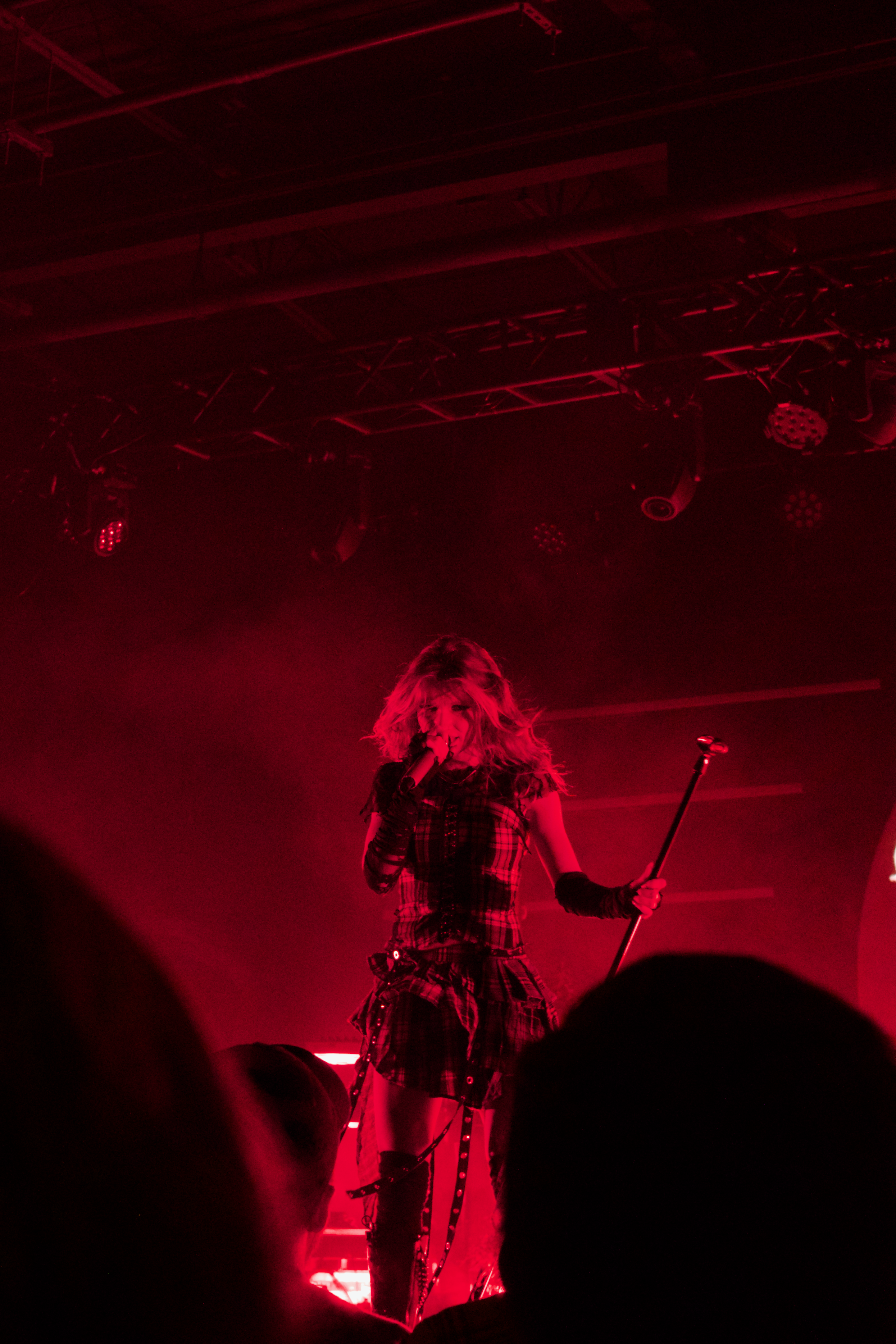
Mandy Lee – October 2024

On March 30, 2023, MisterWives released the single "Out of Your Mind", a notable departure in sound for the band due to being more punk-influenced than their previous work. A second single, "Nosebleeds", followed on May 5, 2023, along with the announcement of their fourth studio album of the same name. Both singles were later included in the album, which was released on July 14, 2023. On July 26, 2024, the band released a deluxe edition of the album, titled Nosebleeds: Encore, for the album's one-year anniversary. It features reworked versions of the album's songs in collaboration with 15 different artists, as well as the new tracks "Organized Chaos" and "Vultures".

=== Cherry Bomb ===
In August 2025, Lee created a new Instagram account for a solo project known as "Cherry Bomb". Cherry Bomb released the debut single "Never Be Me (Motherfucker)" on January 16, 2026. An accompanying music video was directed by Matty Vogel. Her debut album The Pursuit of Pleasure was released on November 13, 2026.

== Discography ==
=== Studio albums ===
List of studio albums, with selected chart positions
Title	Album details	Peak chart positions		
Title	Album details	US	US Alt.	US Rock
Our Own House	Released: February 24, 2015; Label: Photo Finish; Formats: CD, digital download, vinyl	31	7	12
Connect the Dots	Released: May 19, 2017; Label: Photo Finish; Formats: CD, digital download, vinyl	124	19	26
Superbloom	Released: July 24, 2020; Label: Fueled By Ramen; Formats: CD, digital download, vinyl	— (Note: Superbloom did not enter the US Billboard 200 but did peak at number 78 on the US Top Album Sales chart.)	—	—
Nosebleeds	Released: July 14, 2023; Label: Photo Finish / Resilient Little Records; Formats: CD, digital download, vinyl	—	—	—
Nosebleeds: Encore	Released: July 26, 2024; Label: Photo Finish / Resilient Little Records; Formats: Digital download	—	—	—

=== Extended plays ===
List of extended plays, with selected chart positions
Title	EP details	Peak chart positions		
Title	EP details	US	US Alt.	US Rock
Reflections	Released: January 7, 2014; Label: Photo Finish; Formats: Digital download	84	24	30
Spotify Sessions	Released: September 15, 2014; Label: Republic; Formats: Streamed audio	—	—	—
Mini Bloom	Released: November 8, 2019; Label: Fueled by Ramen; Formats: Digital download	—	—	—

=== Singles ===
List of singles, with selected chart positions, showing year released and album name
Title	Year	Peak chart positions					Certifications	Album
Title	Year	US Bub.	US Alt.	US Rock	CAN Rock	FRA	Certifications	Album
"Reflections"	2014	23	31	13	—	—	RIAA: Platinum	Reflections / Our Own House
"Vagabond"	2014	—	—	—	—	—		Reflections / Our Own House
"Our Own House"	2015	—	40	25	—	50	RIAA: Gold	Our Own House
"Hurricane"	2015	—	—	—	—	—		Our Own House
"Twisted Tongue"	2015	—	—	—	—	—		Non-album single
"Kings and Queens"	2015	—	—	—	—	—		Non-album single
"Machine"	2017	—	—	—	—	—		Connect the Dots
"Oh Love"	2017	—	—	—	—	—		Connect the Dots
"Drummer Boy"	2017	—	—	—	—	—		Connect the Dots
"Coloring Outside The Lines"	2017	—	—	—	—	—		Connect the Dots
"Never Give Up On Me"	2017	—	—	—	—	—		Non-album single
"whywhywhy"	2019	—	—	—	—	—		Mini Bloom
"The End"	2019	—	—	—	—	—		Mini Bloom
"rock bottom"	2020	—	—	—	—	—		Superbloom
"SUPERBLOOM"	2020	—	—	—	—	—		Superbloom
"decide to be happy"	2020	—	—	—	—	—		Superbloom
"3 Small Words"	2020	—	—	—	—	—		Superbloom
"stepped on a bee"	2021	—	—	—	—	—		Non-album singles
"Easy" / "Where Do We Go From Here?"	2022	—	—	—	—	—		Non-album singles
"Wrongside"	2022	—	—	—	—	—		Non-album singles
"Out of Your Mind"	2023	—	—	—	—	—		Nosebleeds
"Nosebleeds"	2023	—	32	— (Note: "Nosebleeds" did not enter the Hot Rock & Alternative Songs chart, but peaked at number 45 on the Rock & Alternative Airplay chart.)	42	—		Nosebleeds
"Ultraviolet"	2023	—	—	—	—	—		Nosebleeds
"Organized Chaos"	2024	—	—	—	—	—		Nosebleeds: Encore
"Other Side" (featuring Charlotte Sands)	2024	—	—	—	—	—		Nosebleeds: Encore
"—" denotes a recording that did not chart or was not released in that territory.

On the Mediabase Alternative charts, the following additional peaks were reached: Machine 38, Coloring Outside The Lines 47, 3 Small Words 57, Nosebleeds 26.

== Members ==
=== Current members ===
- Mandy Lee – lead vocals (2012–present)
- William Hehir – bass, backing vocals (2012–present)
- Marc Campbell – guitar (2012–present)
- Etienne Bowler – drums, percussion (2012–present)
- Mike Murphy – keyboards, saxophone (2012–present)

=== Former members ===
- Jesse Blum – trumpet, keyboards (2012–2021)
