= Race You to the Bottom =

Studio album by New Medicine
- Released: September 27, 2010 US; September 28, 2010 UK
- Recorded: January–July 2010
- Genre: Hard rock, punk rock, rap rock
- Length: 35:19; 46:57 (w/ bonus tracks)
- Label: Photo Finish, Atlantic
- Producer: Jason Livermore

Singles from Race You to the Bottom
- 1. "Laid" Released: May 25, 2010

Professional ratings
Review scores
Source	Rating
Allmusic	3/5 stars
Amazon.com	3/5 stars
Evigshed	4/5 stars

Race You to the Bottom is the debut studio album by American hard rock band New Medicine, released through Photo Finish Records and Atlantic on September 27, 2010.

== Track listing ==
All tracks are written by New Medicine.

Standard edition
No.	Title	Length
1.	"Laid"	3:11
2.	"Rich Kids"	3:01
3.	"Little Sister"	3:39
4.	"End of the World"	3:11
5.	"Baby's Gone"	3:42
6.	"Resolve to Fight"	2:59
7.	"Never Heard"	2:47
8.	"American Wasted"	3:07
9.	"It's a War"	3:33
10.	"Race You to the Bottom"	2:57
11.	"Sun Goes Down"	3:12
Total length:		35:19

Deluxe edition
No.	Title	Length
12.	"The Takeover"	2:32
13.	"We Are the Fire"	3:16
14.	"Amen"	3:01
15.	"Love You Now"	2:49
Total length:		46:57

== Personnel ==
Race You to the Bottom album personnel as listed on Allmusic.

New Medicine

- Jake Scherer – vocals / guitar
- Matt Brady – bass
- Dan Garland – guitar
- Ryan Guanzon – drums

Additional musicians

- Tommy Henriksen – programming
- Kevin Kadish – composer, engineer, producer, vocals
- Sean Gould – bass
- Jennifer Adan – composer
- Billy Falcon – composer
- Karl Owen Gronwall – composer
- Elisha Hoffman – composer
- Sam Hollander – composer
- Rebecca Lynn Howard – composer
- Zac Maloy – composer
- Kevin Wayne – composer

Artwork and design

- Mark Obriski – art direction, photography
- Theo Kogan Hair – stylist, make-up
- Chris Phelps – photography
- Andrew Zaeh – photography
- Basia Zamorska – stylist

Production and recording

- Jason Livermore – production
- Colt Leeb – assistant engineering
- S*A*M – assistant engineering
- Sluggo – assistant engineering
- Chris Gehringer – mastering
- David Bendeth – mixing
- Steve Hodge – mixing, producer
- James "Fluff" Harley – mixing
- Anne Declemente – A&R
- Matt Galle – A&R
- Mike Marquis – A&R
- Ryan Harlacher – booking
- Rebecca Wedlake – booking
- Anna Jacobson Leong – management
- John Coster – marketing
- Gerardo Cueva – marketing
- David McKay – marketing
- Brian Raney – package production

== Chart positions ==
Chart (2010)	Peak position
US Billboard 200	104
US Top Heatseekers Albums	2
US Top Rock Albums	39
