= New Medicine =

American rock band

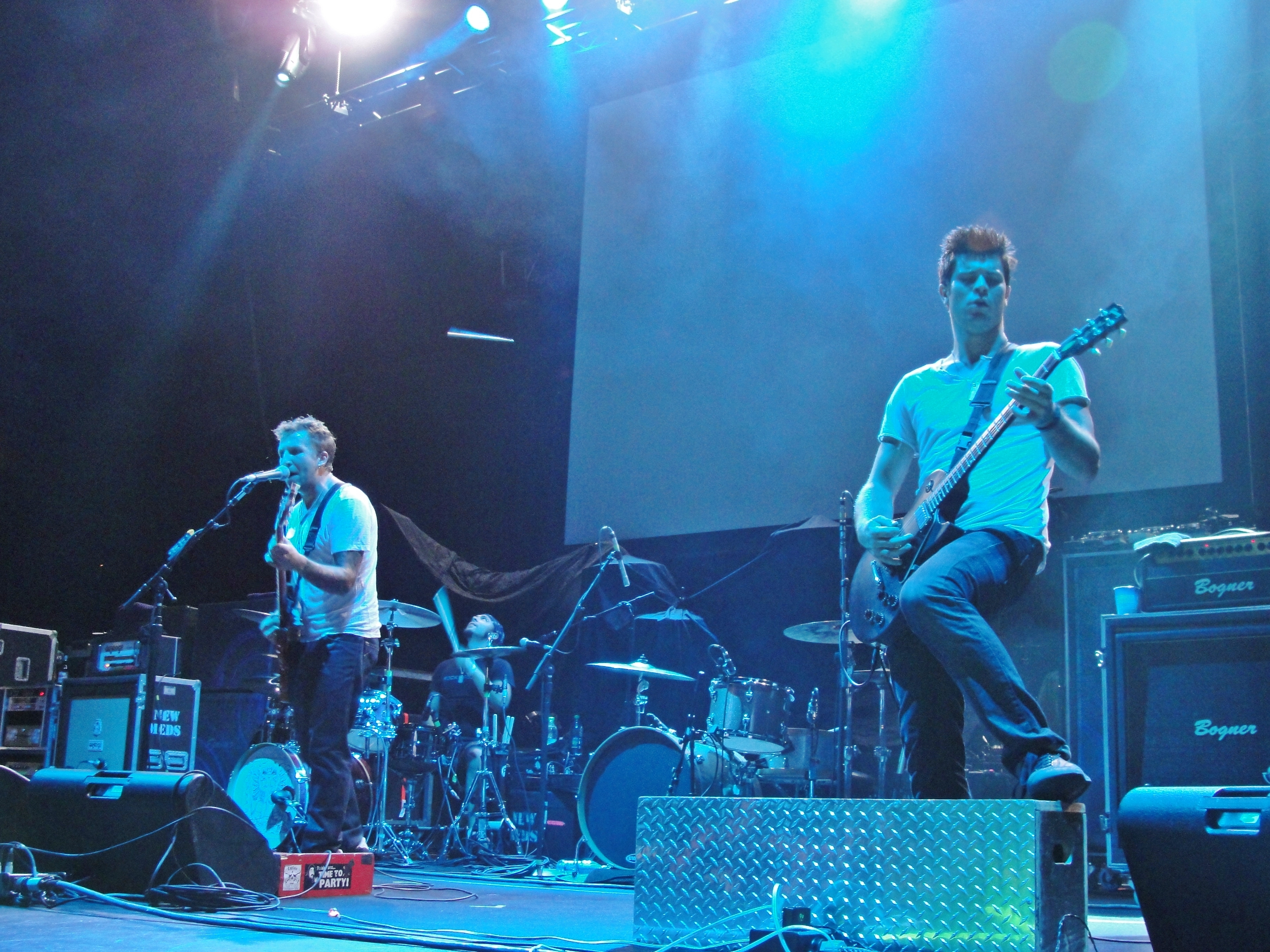
- New Medicine performing live at the Carnival of Madness tour in 2012 at the Laredo Energy Arena

Background information
- Also known as: A Verse Unsung
- Origin: Orono, Minnesota, United States
- Genres: Hard rock, post-grunge
- Years active: 2009–2015, 2019–present
- Labels: Imagen Records, Photo Finish Records
- Website: newmedicinerocks.com

New Medicine (formerly A Verse Unsung) is an American rock band from Minneapolis, Minnesota, formed in 2009.

== History ==
New Medicine was originally formed as A Verse Unsung by two friends, Jake Scherer and Dan Garland, who were attending Orono High School at the time. The two would write lyrics during classes then work through them musically at the Scherer family's farm in Medina where he lived. Kenny Fritze and Aaron Gates were later added to the band and eventually replaced. They signed to Photo Finish Records after forming the new band with Ryan Guanzon and Matt Brady, calling themselves New Medicine. Their debut album, Race You to the Bottom, was released September 18, 2010. The band has toured with major recording artists such as Avenged Sevenfold, Halestorm, Buckcherry, and Stone Sour. Their songs "Race You to the Bottom," "Laid," and "Rich Kids" have all been added into rotation on Sirius XM Radio's Octane Channel. "Laid" hit number 32 on the Mainstream Rock chart in Spring 2011, "Race You to the Bottom" hit number 19 on the Mainstream Rock chart in Spring 2012, and "Rich Kids" hit number 31 on the Mainstream Rock chart in Fall 2012, respectively. On December 21, 2012, Brady announced he was leaving the band to spend more time with Joy2theWorld, which helps women and children in Ghana, west Africa. Later the same year, Ryan Guanzon left the band to produce music. Dylan Wood (ex-Emphatic) took the drums duties since then, and Kyle LeBlanc took over on bass guitar. They released their second album Breaking the Model on August 26, 2014 via Imagen Records, with the lead single "One Too Many" hitting number 40 on the Mainstream Rock. The band said on their Facebook page that they had begun work on a new album as of November 28, 2013, and it was released on August 25, 2014. Guanzon returned to the band for a single performance on guitar in April 2015 in the band's hometown of Medina, doing so because Garland, the lead guitarist, was not able to be there. Brady also made an appearance on-stage that same night as he was in attendance. On April 27, 2015, it was announced that the band would be going on an indefinite hiatus. This hiatus was ended on December 5, 2019, when the band declared via Facebook that they were working on a new album due to their increased following on Spotify. On March 13, 2020, they released their first song of the new album Die Trying with the same name. At the end of January 2021, the rock band posted in all social networks the news about the release of a new single together with Adelitas Way. On March 12, they released a new single "Own It" which contains a track of the same name and a rock remix. On February 3, 2025, They released an acoustic cover version of Red Hot Chili Peppers' Californication for the LA Wildfire relief.

== Band members ==
=== Current ===
- Jake Scherer – lead vocals, rhythm guitar
- Dan Garland – lead guitar
- Matt Brady – bass, backing vocals
- Ryan Guanzon – drums

=== Former ===
- Dylan Wood – drums
- Ryan Wood – rhythm guitar
- Kyle LeBlanc – bass
- Kenny Fritze
- Aaron Gates

== Tours ==
- Burn Halo w/ Track Fighter and New Medicine. (Late Summer to Early Autumn 2009)
- The Used/Chiodos & New Medicine Tour. (April 17, 2010)
- Halestorm w/ Adelitas Way & Since October. (July 2010)
- Uproar Festival w/ Avenged Sevenfold, Disturbed, & Stone Sour. (August 17 - October 4, 2010)
- Rise From Ashes Tour w/ D.R.U.G.S. & Eyes Set to Kill. (December 4–19, 2010)
- Nightmare After Christmas Tour w/ Avenged Sevenfold, Stone Sour, & Hollywood Undead. (January 20-February 13, 2011)
- Revolt Tour with Hollywood Undead, Drive A, and 10 Years (April 6, 2011 - May 27, 2011).
- Opened for the Shinedown Concert at the Ogden Theater, Denver, Colorado, April 2, 2012. Performed before Adelitas Way
- Played Jager stage at Carolina Rebellion on May 5, 2012.
- Played Jeremiah Weed Stage at Rockfest in Kansas City, Missouri, May 12, 2012.
- Played FYE stage at Rock on the Range in Columbus, Ohio, May 19, 2012
- Played Intersection in Grand Rapids, Michigan, to finish tour with Halestorm on July 21, 2012
- Played the Carnival of Madness Tour with Cavo, Halestorm, Chevelle and Evanescence.
- Played Wicked Moose, Rochester, Minnesota, with Buckcherry March 15, 2013
- Played Medina Entertainment Center, Medina, Minnesota, with Buckcherry March 16, 2013
- Played Herkirmer Block/Patio Party, Minneapolis, Minnesota, (1st show with new bass player and drummer) June 8, 2013
- Played Medina Entertainment Center (Outdoors), Medina, Minnesota, with Hairball June 15, 2013
- Played Tour with Halestorm fall/winter 2014
- Played Buzzfest 32 at Cynthia Woods Mitchell Pavilion, The Woodlands, Texas, on October 18, 2014
- Played Fine Line Music Cafe Minneapolis, Minnesota (homecoming Xmas show) with former drummer Ryan Guanzon's new Band "Late Night Fights" opening. Former bass player, Matt Brady, in attendance with stage diving. December 20, 2014
- Played Medina Entertainment Center, Medina, Minnesota (Hometown/Final Show before Indefinite Hiatus) with Buckcherry and Cold Kingdom. Former drummer, Ryan Guanzon, handled lead guitar duties from the absent Dan Garland. Former bass player, Matt Brady, also in attendance. April 4, 2015

== Discography ==
New Medicine discography
- Studio albums: 2
- Extended plays: 0
- Singles: 7
- Music videos: 2

=== Studio albums ===
Year	Album details	Peak chart positions		
Year	Album details	US	US Heat	US Rock
2010	Race You to the Bottom: Released: September 18, 2010; Label: Photo Finish Records	104	2	39
2014	Breaking The Model: Released: August 25, 2014; Label: Imagen Records			

=== Singles ===
Year	Title	Peak Positions		Album
Year	Title	U.S. Main.	U.S. Rock	Album
2010	"Laid"	32		Race You to the Bottom
2011	"Baby's Gone"			Race You to the Bottom
2011	"Race You to the Bottom"	19	40	Race You to the Bottom
2011	"Rich Kids"	31		Race You to the Bottom
2014	"One Too Many"	37		Breaking The Model
2020	"Die Trying"			Non-album single
2021	"Own It" (with Adelitas Way)			Rivals
2021	"Fuck It"			Non-album single
2022	"Up" (with Adelitas Way)			Power
2023	"Dangerous"			Non-album singles
2023	"Take Me Away"			Non-album singles
2023	"Past the Past"			Non-album singles
2023	"Can't Help Myself"			Non-album singles
2023	"Fire Up the Night"			Non-album singles
2023	"Down 2023" (with Thousand Foot Krutch)			The End Is Where We Begin: Reignited
2023	"Never Know"			Non-album singles
2023	"Dig Deep" (with Adelitas Way)			Non-album singles
2024	"Control Freak"			Non-album singles
2024	"My Turn"			Non-album singles
2024	"Fake Friends" (with Citizen Soldier)			Non-album singles
2025	"Californication" (Red Hot Chili Peppers cover)			Non-album singles
2026	"Underdog" (with Citizen Soldier and Adelitas Way)			Non-album singles
