= The Mowgli's =

American rock band

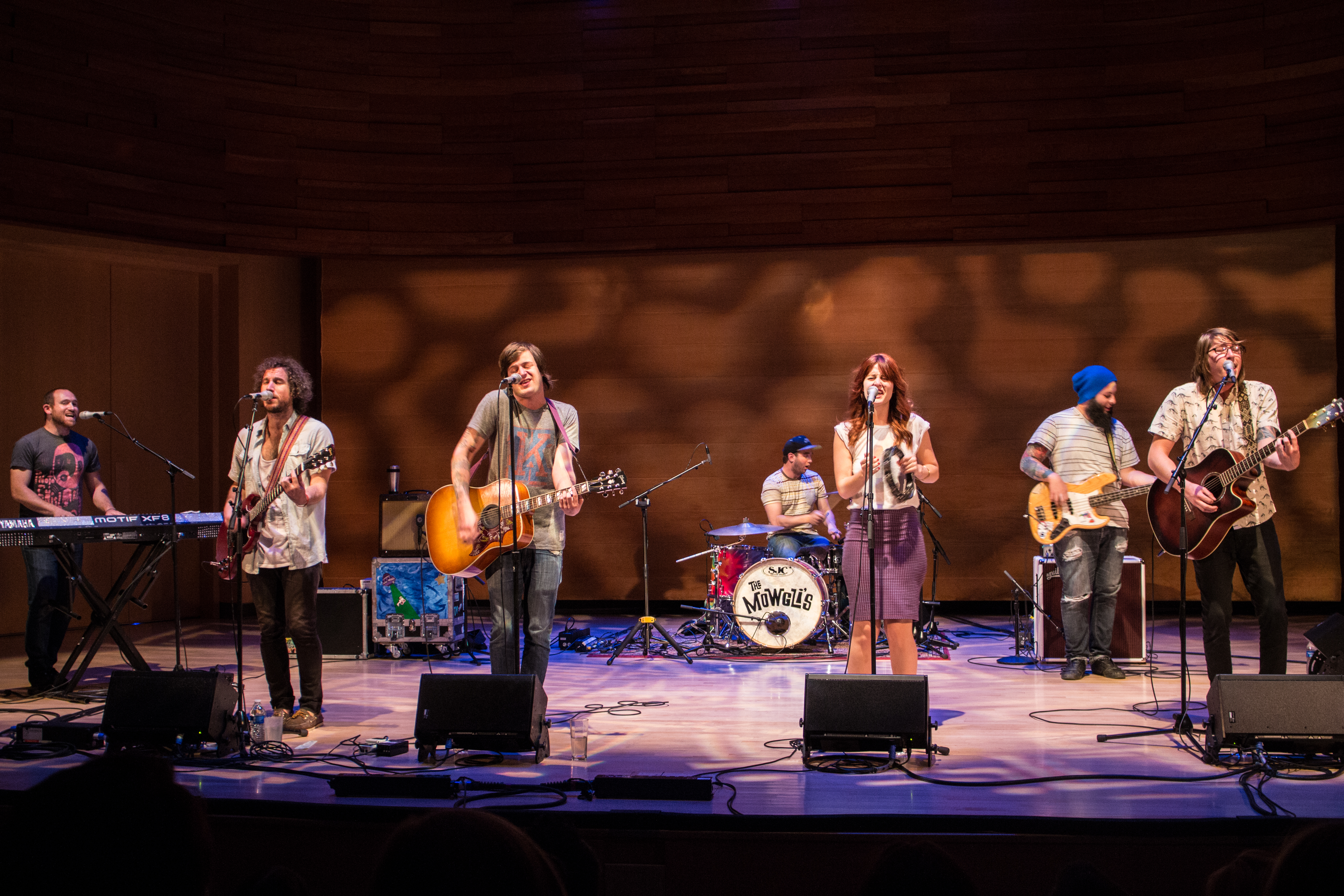
- The Mowgli's performing in 2014

Background information
- Origin: Calabasas, California, U.S.
- Genres: Alternative rock, indie rock, indie folk, sunshine pop
- Years active: 2010–2023
- Labels: Island, Republic
- Members: Katie Jayne Earl; Dave Appelbaum; Josh Hogan; Matthew Di Panni; Andy Warren
- Past members: Michael Vincze; Pete Mallinger; Matt Carriere; Spencer Trent; Colin Dieden
- Website: themowglis.net

The Mowgli's are an American alternative rock band from Calabasas, California, most known for their alternative radio hit single "San Francisco".

== Background and formation ==
Most of The Mowgli's grew up together outside of Los Angeles in Calabasas, CA. Dieden grew up in Kansas City and Hogan grew up in Oklahoma City.

In late 2009, Michael Vincze met Colin Dieden, who had recently moved from Kansas City, at a party. Later, the two wrote one of the group's first songs by combining elements of pieces they were both developing. This would become the track "The Great Divide".

It was during an impromptu trip to San Francisco that Vincze and Dieden wrote the track "San Francisco" one night at a cheap motel room the bandmates were staying in. Hogan joined after sitting in with the band on a jam session one evening.

They are named after a former band member's dog Mowgli, itself named after the character from Rudyard Kipling's novel The Jungle Book. The apostrophe in their name is meant to be possessive: rather than the dog belonging to them, they felt they belonged to the dog.

Guitarist/singer Josh Hogan proposed to singer/percussionist Katie Earl on October 7, 2016. The pair announced their engagement via Twitter and were married on October 6, 2017

== Music career ==
=== 2010: Beginning ===
The band released their first recordings in March 2010 for free download through thecollectiveca.com and bandcamp. Of that batch were the demos for "San Francisco", "The Great Divide", "Time", "I've Been Around" & "Waiting For The Dawn". These demos were recorded in a Woodland Hills garage studio known as The Victory House. Through 2010 they headlined an array of 'mini' festival/event concerts called "manifestivals" where all of the bands, artists and friends of the collective would join forces and perform together. Bands would rock back to back on 2 stages with some of The Mowgli's performing in as many as all of the groups on the often up to 8 act line ups. The nights would usually culminate in one massive Mowgli's performance where it was likely that most of the collective and the audience would all join on stage to sing.

In the Summer of 2010, most of the band rented a house in Venice Beach, CA. They spent those months performing hundreds of shows in the area, sometimes as many as five gigs in a day and night, anywhere from cafes to the Venice Boardwalk to art galleries, venues, bars, underground warehouse gatherings, backyards, offices, house parties, hair salons, clothing stores, farmer's markets, airplane hangars, etc.

=== 2011–2012: Sound the Drum ===
The Mowgli's spent the better part of 2011 migrating from Venice and gigging throughout the Southwest while recording what would later become their debut LP Sound the Drum. Most of the recording was done in former member and producer Christian James Hand's Hollywood studio, Mid-Bronx Recording. Vocals were also recorded at St. Genevieve's Church in Panorama City and Swinghouse Studios.

Colin Dieden, a fan of Brooklyn singer-songwriter Kevin Devine, approached Devine's management, CandyShop, who began representing the band.

That summer the band launched a Kickstarter campaign, informing fans that "they had been kidnapped by a record producing kangaroo who was known simply as 'Kevin'." Kevin held The Mowgli's and their LP hostage until their campaign goal was met and his ransom could be paid.

In October 2011, the band participated in the Occupy Movement, performing a number of concerts at the Los Angeles City Hall encampment and raising awareness through social media. They had crowds of activists chanting "love's not dead!" and "we are free if we wake up!" and performed with John Densmore, NOFX, Tom Morello, Danny Glover, The Makepeace Brothers, The Luminaries, Parker Ainsworth, Matthew Schildkret, Eduardo Manilla, Peter Joseph & Marianne Williamson.

On May 1, 2012, they independently released their debut LP Sound the Drum. The single "San Francisco" was sent to College Radio, where it peaked only at No. 91 on the CMJ charts. Steven Spoerl of PopMatters gave the album seven out of 10, calling their music a "delightful blend of summer coastal powerpop and hints of folk-rock" but commenting that the album started to "slow down at the end" and that the band's music might benefit from shorter releases.

The record came to the attention of Mike Marquis at Paradigm, who began booking the band almost immediately, sight unseen. On October 5, 2012, the Mowgli's signed to Photo Finish Records, a joint venture with Island-DefJam. Culling five songs from Sound the Drum, Photo Finish released the extended play Love's Not Dead in October 2012, with iTunes making the song "San Francisco" the single of the week. The record was released in the week when the single "San Francisco" was chosen as iTunes Single of the Week, it also coincided with the week of Hurricane Sandy. The band performed the song on The Tonight Show With Jay Leno on November 17, 2012. "San Francisco" charted at #11 on the Alternative Music Chart and reached #3 on the AAA Charts. The song was also the 2012 theme for the San Francisco Giants World Series-winning run. The band also performed the song on Jimmy Kimmel Live on February 21, 2013, and on Conan on May 24, 2013.

Spencer Trent was replaced on drums by Andy Warren. Trent became the band's percussionist & second keyboard player, eventually gravitating to guitar. In mid-October The San Francisco Giants began playing the song "San Francisco" during their games and using it in some of their team videos. The Giants went on to make the song a part of their theme as they took the 2012 World Series in a 4–0 sweep against the Detroit Tigers.

The band performed "San Francisco" on The Tonight Show with Jay Leno on November 17. They contributed music for various indie movies, TV and video games including recording a version of "San Francisco" in "Simlish" for The Sims.

=== 2013–2014: Waiting for the Dawn ===
The Mowgli's co-headlined a US tour with Family of the Year, stopping at SXSW2013 along the way.

On April 27, 2013, "San Francisco" hit #1 on the Sirius Alt 18 Countdown and shortly afterwards held the No. 1 spot on Alt Nation for two weeks. The song peaked at #11 on the Alternative Radio Charts and #4 on the AAA charts, where it was No. 9 overall for the year. The video for "San Francisco" was directed by Justin Baldoni.

They performed "San Francisco" live on February 21 at Jimmy Kimmel Live and on Conan on May 23.

The band toured the country 3 more times during 2013, playing at Bonnaroo, Lollapalooza, Bunberry Festival, Summerfest, Center of the Universe, Hangout Festival, Bumbershoot, Loufest, Cultivate Chicago, Taste of Chicago Festival, Music Midtown Atlanta and Austin City Limits. During the 2nd weekend of ACL, the festival was cancelled due to rain, and the band performed an impromptu free show at the Austin Front Steps Homeless Shelter, generating the most single-day donations that the shelter had seen.

The full-length debut for Photo Finish, Waiting for the Dawn, was released June 18, 2013. The album contains songs from Love's Not Dead, several other tracks from Sound The Drum and 4 newly recorded tracks. At the 11th hour, the band returned to the studio to re-record several songs for the record. The LP debuted at No. 31 on Top Rock Albums, and No. 109 on the Billboard 200, selling 4,000 copies in its debut week. The band debuted the second single "The Great Divide" on Leno again on June 20, 2013. On July 9, 2013, the Mowgli's were inducted into the Ride of Fame. A double decker tour bus now roams the streets of New York City with them immortalized on it.

They embarked on a support tour with Walk the Moon in October, transitioning into a headline tour of the country with support from American Authors, Royal Teeth, The Rocketboys, X-Ambassadors, Blondfire, Kopecky Family Band, Hunter Hunted. The band recorded a new song "Your Friend" for the Relativity movie Earth to Echo. The song "Say It, Just Say It" was used in a trailer and as the end titles for the Adam Sandler movie Blended. A video for "Say It, Just Say It" which featured Bill Nye as the DJ was shot but never finished or released.

In February, Michael Vincze announced that he had left the band as of the beginning of 2014 to pursue solo endeavors. Spencer Trent moved to guitar & vocals.

The band began a nationwide headlining tour in March 2014, beginning with a San Francisco show and another stint at SXSW. Over the summer they began recording for their 2nd Photo Finish record with producer Tony Hoffer (Silversun Pickups, Fitz and the Tantrums).

In addition to appearing at Wakarusa, Firefly, Riverfest and Osheaga, the band also headlined two sold-out shows at The Troubadour in Los Angeles in July and performed the National Anthem at AT&T Park in San Francisco before a SF Giants/Diamondbacks game. In August they supported Manchester Orchestra (whom they met at a series of college shows earlier in the year) on a brief tour. Finishing up recording for the new LP, the band embarked on the 7 week Honda Civic nationwide tour with American Authors, Echosmith and Oh Honey.

=== 2014–2015: Kids in Love ===
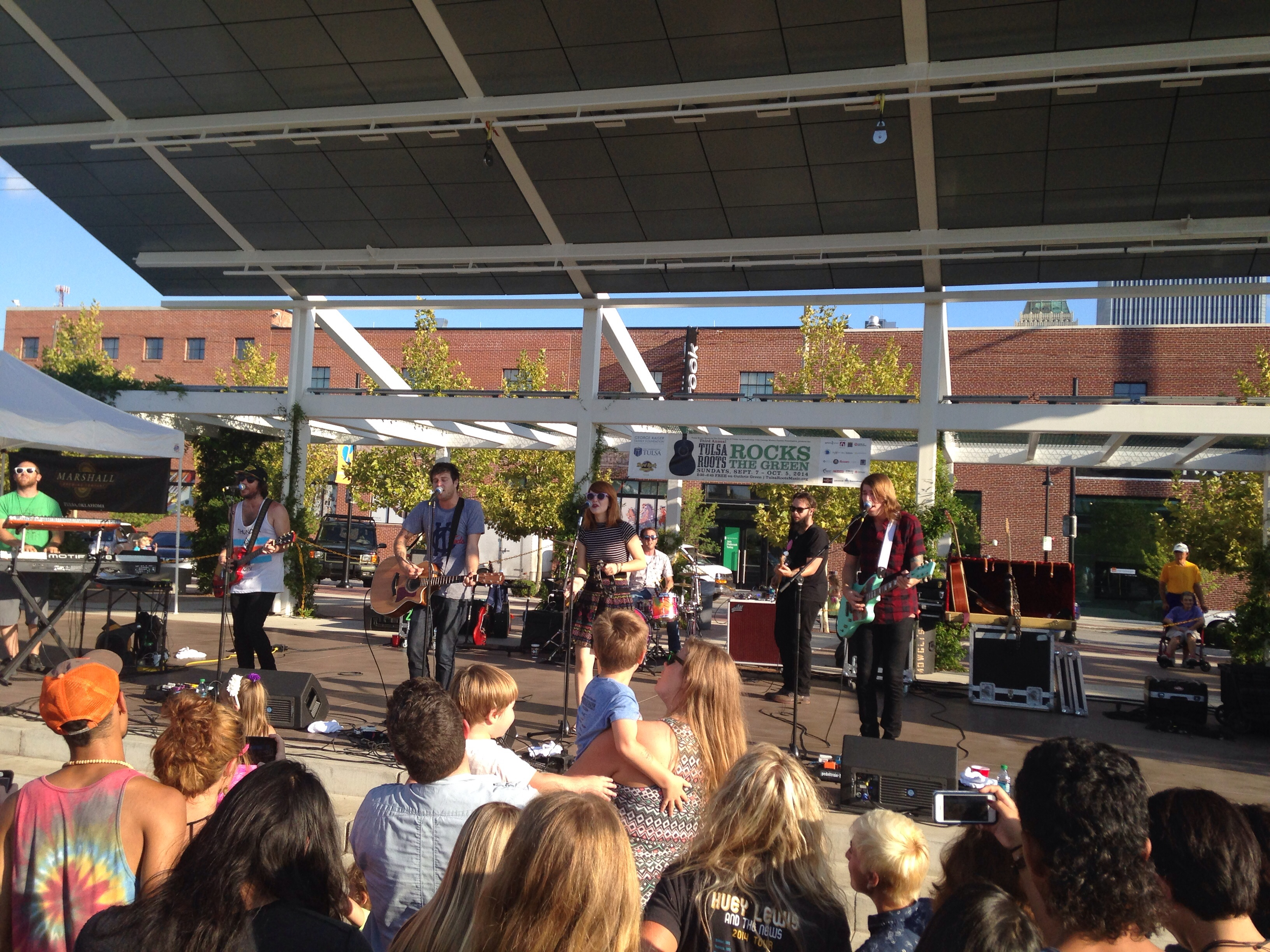
The Mowgli's performing in downtown Tulsa, Oklahoma, in September 2014

Returning to Los Angeles, the band recorded an additional couple of songs with Hoffer, as well as working with former collaborators Captain Cuts and Matt Radosevich. During a visit to Kansas City's 96.5 The Buzz, Dieden announced that the new LP would be titled Kids in Love and played the first song "Through The Dark" on air. The song was subsequently added to rotation on The Buzz, SiriusXM's AltNation and a handful of other stations.

"Through the Dark" was the first single released off of Kids in Love. After airing on the radio and a select few social media outlets, the song was officially released on iTunes on December 15, 2014.

The Mowgli's released another single off Kids in Love titled "I'm Good" on February 3, 2015. The single made it onto the Sirius XM Top Alt 18 List. Filming for the "I'm Good" music video took place near Joshua Tree National Park in the California desert.

The entire Kids in Love album was released on iTunes on April 14, 2015, midway through the band's US Headline tour of the same name, which featured support acts Hippo Campus and Night Riots. The Mowgli's performed at several festivals during the early summer, including Summerfest and in July announced a co-headline Fall US tour with Canadian artist Lights as well as summer festival dates in Chicago, Washington DC and Norfolk, VA.

The band supported The International Rescue Committee during their fall tour, releasing the song "Room For All Of Us" as a charity single.

=== 2016: Where'd Your Weekend Go? ===
In March 2016, the band began work on their third LP for Photo Finish Records, working with producer Mike Green (All Time Low, Paramore). Guitarist Spencer Trent left the band midway through recording to pursue other creative endeavors. The band announced plans to release the new record in the Fall and initially released the song "Freakin' Me Out", followed by "Spacin Out". They subsequently announced that the new LP would be titled Where'd Your Weekend Go?

The LP was released September 30 whilst the band was midway through tour (with support from Colony House and Dreamers).

In late October 2016, the band released the stand-alone single "Times Are Still Changing". The song was recorded and produced earlier in 2016 by Marc Jordan (Bleached (band), The Cult, Gina And The Eastern Block). "With the upcoming election having such an effect on all of us, not just here in the States but globally, it feels really important to honor our democracy, use our voices, and VOTE! Like the song says, the times are still changing, and it's up to us to make that change for the better!” – Josh Hogan

=== 2017 ===
The band released a B side from the Kids In Love sessions, "4AM" and toured supporting The Maine during the Spring. Writing and playing mostly college and one-off shows (including supporting Dashboard Confessional in Miami for a promotional show with Billboard Magazine and Ford Motors), they also officially released their Christmas song "It's Christmas Time" on November 2, again with proceeds going to The International Rescue Committee. The band officially parted ways with Photo Finish Records in September.

=== 2018: I Was Starting to Wonder ===
Announcing a nationwide tour of smaller venues - their first headline tour in over 18 months - the band released new single "Real Good Life" February 2. Stating that the tour was a chance to get back to basics, revisiting some old songs and trying out a few new ones, they also announced further partnerships with The IRC. "Real Good Life" debuted on Los Angeles alternative station KROQ's "Locals Only with Kat Corbett" show as well as Sirius XM Alt Nation's "Advanced Placement". The band wrapped their tour in Kansas City, releasing a single by the same name. After July dates playing for the Armed Forces in Soto Cano, Honduras and Guantanamo Bay Naval Base, the group folded their previous two singles into a new EP titled "I Was Starting To Wonder". The EP featured 2 new songs, "Best of Us" and "I Feel Good About This", about which the band stated "was the very epitome of a Mowgli's song as soon as we started writing it". Simultaneously they announced a short West Coast Tour for November (with support from Arms Akimbo and Elijah Noll).

During this time, the group provided the intro theme to the Disney Channel series Big City Greens.

=== 2019: American Feelings ===
On March 1, 2019, the band released the EP American Feelings, which included the tracks "Mr. Telephone" and "Norman Rockwell".

On May 13, 2019, the band announced that lead singer Colin Dieden would be taking a break from the band to focus on his solo project and would not be a part of the Summer Vacation 2019 tour. Dieden subsequently left the group, signing to REDMusic under the moniker Little Hurt. The 5 remaining original members announced a fall tour with New Politics and Plain White T's.

=== 2020: Dizzyonatightrope ===
Late 2019 saw the release of a simultaneous single and video for "Fighting with Yourself", with vocals by Earl. Its follow up, "Wasting Time" premiered on Forbes Magazine on January 3, 2020, and garnered features on Spotify's New Music Friday worldwide, a record number for the band. The video (which featured a same-sex break up between actors Lucy Walsh and Gina Daidone) was heralded by several LGBTQ publications. The band embarked on their first UK Tour in support of the single.

On September 25, 2020, the band released a single entitled "More Love". Along with the release, The Mowgli's announced they were going on an indefinite hiatus.

In 2023, Josh Hogan and Katie Jayne Earl had a baby, and on February 10, 2024, the band reunited for a show at The Novo Theater in Los Angeles.

== Discography ==
=== Albums ===
Title	Album details	Chart positions			Sales	Track lists
Title	Album details	US	US Heat	US Rock	Sales	Track lists
Sound the Drum	Released: May 1, 2012; Label: Self-release; Format: Digital CD	—	—	—		Track list: 1. "Hi Hey There Hello" – 3:25; 2. "San Francisco" – 2:52; 3. "Waiting for the Dawn" – 3:30; 4. "Slowly, Slowly" – 4:04; 5. "Time" – 3:29; 6. "Gambler's Hall" – 3:14; 7. "The Great Divide" – 3:05; 8. "Ca$h" – 2:43; 9. "Carry Your Will" – 4:12; 10. "See I'm Alive" – 4:46; 11. "I've Been Around" – 3:35; 12. "Colin's Song" – 3:20; 13. "Together (We Are One)" – 2:21; 14. "We Are Free" – 6:29
Waiting for the Dawn	Released: June 18, 2013; Label: Photo Finish Records/Island Records; Format: Digital download, CD, vinyl	109	2	31	US: 38,000	Track list: 1. "San Francisco" – 2:52; 2. "Slowly, Slowly" – 4:06; 3. "Waiting for the Dawn" – 3:34; 4. "Love Is Easy" – 4:08; 5. "Clean Light" – 3:11; 6. "Time" – 3:32; 7. "Emily" – 3:33; 8. "The Great Divide" – 3:06; 9. "Say It, Just Say It" – 3:22; 10. "Leave It Up to Me" – 3:27; 11. "Carry Your Will" – 4:19; 12. "Hi, Hey There, Hello" – 3:27; 13. "We Are Free" – 6:29
Kids in Love	Released: April 14, 2015; Label: Photo Finish Records/Island Records; Format: Digital download, CD, vinyl	156	1	29		Track list: 1. "You're Not Alone" – 3:21; 2. "I'm Good" –2:46; 3. "Bad Dream" – 3:07; 4. "What's Going On" – 4:15; 5. "Through the Dark" – 3:04; 6. "Whatever Forever" – 3:13; 7. "Make It Right" – 3:44; 8. "Love Me Anyway" – 3:19; 9. "Shake Me Up" – 3:29; 10. "Home to You" – 3:13; 11. "Kids in Love" – 3:12; 12. "Sunlight" – 4:52
Where'd Your Weekend Go?	Released: September 30, 2016; Label: Photo Finish Records; Format: Digital download, CD	—	—	—		Track list: 1. "So What" – 3:10; 2. "Spacin' Out" – 2:54; 3. "Bad Thing" – 3:14; 4. "Spiderweb" – 2:42; 5. "Automatic" – 2:49; 6. "Alone Sometimes" – 2:46; 7. "Arms & Legs" – 2:04; 8. "Freakin' Me Out" – 2:59; 9. "Monster" – 3:00; 10. "Last Forever" – 3:28; 11. "Open Energy" – 4:03

=== Extended plays ===
Title	Extended play details	Chart positions	Track lists
Title	Extended play details	US Heat	Track lists
Love's Not Dead	Released: October 2012; Label: Photo Finish Records/Island Records; Format: CD	23	Track list: 1. "San Francisco" – 4:03; 2. "The Great Divide" – 2:43; 3. "Time" – 3:22; 4. "Slowly, Slowly" – 3:06; 5. "Carry Your Will" – 2:54
I Was Starting to Wonder	Released: August 17, 2018; Label: CandyShop Recordings; Format: Digital Download, Streaming	—	Track list: 1. "I Feel Good About This" – 3:22; 2. "Best of Us" – 2:50; 3. "Kansas City" – 3:02; 4. "Real Good Life" – 3:25
American Feelings	Released: March 1, 2019; Label: CandyShop Recordings; Format: Digital Download, Streaming	—	Track list: 1. "Hard to Love" – 3:22; 2. "Mr. Telephone" – 3:21; 3. "Norman Rockwell" – 3:45; 4. "Talk About It" – 2:33
Dizzyonatightrope	Released: May 8, 2020; Label: The Mowgli's Band LLC; Format: Digital Download, Streaming	—	Track list: 1. "Wasting Time; – 3:44; 2. "Vacation; – 3:15; 3. "Weight On Me; – 3:49; 4. "Fighting With Yourself; – 3:40

=== Singles ===
List of singles, with selected chart positions, showing year released and album name
Title	Year	Peak chart positions					Certifications	Album
Title	Year	US AAA	US Alt.	US Rock	CAN Rock	SWE	Certifications	Album
"San Francisco"	2012	2	13	32	23	—	RIAA: Gold	Waiting for the Dawn
"The Great Divide"	2013	—	50	—	—	—		Waiting for the Dawn
"Through the Dark"	2014	—	—	—	—	—		Kids in Love
"I'm Good"	2015	—	41	47	—	—	RIAA: Gold	Kids in Love
"Summertime"	2015	—	—	— (Note: "Summertime" did not enter the Rock Songs chart, but peaked at number 43 on the Rock Digital Songs chart.)	—	91		Non-album single
"Room for All of Us"	2015	—	—	—	—	—		Non-album single
"Freakin' Me Out"	2016	—	—	—	—	—		Where'd Your Weekend Go?
"Spacin Out"	2016	—	—	—	—	—		Where'd Your Weekend Go?
"Times Are Still Changing"	2016	—	—	—	—	—		Non-album single
"4AM"	2017	—	—	—	—	—		Non-album single
"Real Good Life"	2018	—	—	—	—	—		I Was Starting to Wonder
"Kansas City"	2018	—	—	—	—	—		I Was Starting to Wonder
"Hard To Love"	2019	—	—	—	—	—		American Feelings
"Mr. Telephone"	2019	—	—	—	—	—		American Feelings
"Fighting With Yourself"	2019	—	—	—	—	—		Non-album single
"Wasting Time"	2020	—	—	—	—	—		Non-album single
