= Brick + Mortar =

American indie rock duo

- Also known as: BRMR; Brick+Mortar; Brick and Mortar
- Origin: Toms River, New Jersey, U.S.
- Genres: Indie rock; electronic rock; drum and bass; alternative rock
- Years active: 2008–present
- Labels: Merovee Records; Photo Finish; Island
- Members: Brandon Asraf; John Tacon
- Website: brmr.net

Brick + Mortar is an indie rock duo founded in Toms River, New Jersey in March 2008. The duo consists of frontman Brandon Asraf (bass guitar, vocals) and John Tacon (drums, electronic samples, vocals). The two members have garnered a notable amount of regional success since their formation. They were signed to Photo Finish Records / Island Def Jam Records, and then Merovee Records / ADA, but now currently have distribution through Believe Recordings.

== History ==
=== Early years ===
Asraf and Tacon began playing music together when they were in middle school, initially as a drum and bass improvisational duo. The two bonded further over their shared interest in songwriting. They made many attempts at playing music with other people but "it never worked. It always ended up with Brandon [Asraf] and I", according to John Tacon. Their first band together was called Black Rhythm.

Both members took private lessons for their respective instruments at a young age, but were largely self-taught in their knowledge of theory and performance.

=== Asbury Park and 7 Years in the Mystic Room ===
In 2008, Asraf and Tacon renamed their project Brick + Mortar, and began focusing more heavily on the use of electronic samples in their music as well as relying less on improvisation and more on structured pop songs. With the promising rise of the Asbury Park musical scene, the duo began performing regularly up and down the New Jersey coast and building a reputation as one of the strongest live acts to come out of the state.

Brick + Mortar's consistent performances quickly gained them a strong following as one of the best live bands in the Asbury Park music scene, eventually rewarding them with opening spots for larger national acts such as River City Extension and Jimmy Eat World at such well-known venues as the Starland Ballroom and the Stone Pony.

In 2010, the band released their first studio LP, recorded independently, entitled 7 Years in the Mystic Room. The record garnered a great deal of positive feedback by critics and fans.

The duo's high energy shows, positive local press, and successful first record had not gone unnoticed by music executives. In December 2010, Brick + Mortar were invited to perform at a Sony/Jive Records showcase the performance venue Le Poisson Rouge in New York City. After a sing-off with a heckler in the audience, the duo won an award presented to them by Senior V.P. of the label.

=== 2011–2015: Dropped EP ===
Brick + Mortar continue to build their fanbase as well as showcase for additional labels. During the later part of 2011, the duo released a number of new singles as well as performance videos after partnering with video artist/media group Humble Humans. They released their first album: 7 Years in the Mystic Room. In January 2012, Brick + Mortar announced on their Facebook page that they had "officially been invited" to perform at the 2012 South by Southwest Music Conference at the "House of Creatives" showcase. In 2013, Brick + Mortar announced that they had signed to Photo Finish Records and would release an EP titled Bangs. In 2014, Brick + Mortar was dropped by their record label, but continued to produce music. They released two singles, "Hollow Tune" and a rerecording of "Move to the Ocean". In 2015, the band released a remixed cover of "Voodoo Child" by Jimi Hendrix that was used in the trailer for the movie Hitman: Agent 47. Later that year they released the album Dropped EP and went on a subsequent tour.

Late in the year the single "Train" was used in a trailer for the TV series Elementary.

=== 2016–2018: Meta Meta Etc. ===
In 2016, Brick + Mortar announced via Instagram they were working on a new album entitled "Dead Moon" for release in September. The title track first single was released April 22, 2016.

On April 6, 2017, Brick + Mortar released a new single entitled "One Little Pill" on YouTube, then on iTunes and Spotify the day after. The song was released in celebration of the band finally receiving ownership of Dropped EP, and with the release of the single they also announced that a remastered version of Dropped EP entitled Dropped Again is on its way featuring "One Little Pill", as well as one other brand new song. "Dropped Again" was then released on May 19, 2017 and is available on iTunes and Spotify for streaming. The new album is a series of remastered songs from the EP "Dropped" as well as two other songs, the later of which was unreleased, "One Little Pill" and "Great Escape". The EP also features the Baauer remix of Brick + Mortar's popular song "Move to the Ocean".

The group's debut full-length album, Meta Meta Etc., was released on August 24, 2018.

=== 2019 ===
The group performed at the sea.hear.now festival which was held on 21 and 22 September 2019 at Asbury Park, New Jersey.

== Musical style ==
Brick + Mortar's musical style has been described as indie rock, electronic rock, drum and bass, and alternative rock.

== Discography ==
=== Extended plays ===
- 7 Years in the Mystic Room EP (Brick + Mortar, LLC) (2010)
- Bangs EP (Photo Finish Records) (2013)
- Dropped EP (Merovee Records) (2015)
- Dropped Again EP (Brick + Mortar, LLC) (2017)
- Meta Meta Etc. (Brick + Mortar, LLC) (2018)
- Melting Up (Opposition) (2022)

=== Singles ===
- "Heatstroke" (Brick + Mortar, LLC) (2011)
- "Move to the Ocean" (Brick + Mortar, LLC) (2013)
- "Bangs" (Photo Finish Records) (2013)
- "Locked in a Cage" (Photo Finish Records) (2014) - #36 Billboard Alternative Songs
- "Move to the Ocean" - Remaster (Merovee/ADA) (2014)
- "Hollow Tune" (Merovee/ADA) (2014)
- "Voodoo Child" (Merovee/ADA) (2015)
- "Train" (Merovee) (2015)
- "Dead Moon" (Brick + Mortar, LLC) (2016)
- "One Little Pill" (Brick + Mortar, LLC) (2017)
- "All Alone" (Brick + Mortar) (2018)
- "Fiend" (Brick + Mortar) (2018)
- "Question" (Brick + Mortar) (2018)
- "Lies of Life" (Brick + Mortar) (2019)
- "American reality" (BAMM!) (2020)
- "Don’t Panic" (Opposition) (2021)
- "Mystery to myself" (Opposition) (2021)
- "Glamour of a food stamp" (Opposition) (2022)
- "self care (so frustrated)" (Opposition) (2022)
- "f*ck ice" (Brick + Mortar, LLC) (2026)
