= Our Own House =

Studio album by MisterWives
- Released: February 24, 2015
- Genre: Pop rock
- Length: 41:25
- Label: Photo Finish
- Producer: Frequency

MisterWives chronology
Reflections (2014)	Our Own House (2015)	Connect the Dots (2017)

Singles from Our Own House
- 1. "Our Own House" Released: 2015; 2. "Hurricane" Released: 2015

Our Own House is the debut studio album by American indie pop band MisterWives, released on February 24, 2015, through Photo Finish Records. As of July 2015, it has reached No. 31 on the Billboard 200. Four songs from the album, "Reflections", "Coffins", "Imagination Infatuation" and "Vagabond", previously appeared on the band's debut extended play (EP) Reflections.

== Critical reception ==
Professional ratings
Review scores
Source	Rating
AllMusic	3/5 stars
Billboard	4/5 stars

The album has received mostly positive reviews. Garrett Kamps of Billboard stated that the album is filled with "rock 'em, sock' em" action. Timothy Monger of AllMusic, while rating the album three out of five stars, still called the album "pleasant". Alex Bear of idobi Radio acclaimed the album, stating that it has a "fresh, dynamic sound" and that it is "the only album [consumers] will need this spring".

== Track listing ==
All tracks are written by Mandy Lee, except "Our Own House" co-written by Martin Terefe; and "Hurricane" co-written by Aaron Accetta and Shep Goodman

No.	Title	Length
1.	"Our Own House"	3:52
2.	"Not Your Way"	3:06
3.	"Reflections"	3:06
4.	"Oceans"	4:12
5.	"Best I Can Do"	3:22
6.	"Hurricane"	3:59
7.	"Coffins"	3:08
8.	"No Need for Dreaming"	3:15
9.	"Box Around the Sun"	3:34
10.	"Imagination Infatuation"	3:33
11.	"Vagabond"	3:05
12.	"Queens"	3:13
Total length:		41:25

== Personnel ==
Adapted credits from the liner notes of Our Own House.

MisterWives

- Mandy Lee – lead vocals, backup vocals, gang vocals
- Etienne Bowler – drums, percussion
- William Hehir – bass, backup vocals, gang vocals
- Marc Campbell – guitar
- Jesse Blum – trumpet, keyboards, accordion

Additional musicians

- Michael Murphy – saxophone (tracks 1, 2, 5, 10)
- Kate Spingarn – cello (track 7)
- Katie Kresek – violin (track 7)

Production

- Frequency – producer
- Etienne Bowler – co-producer, programming
- Danny Rico – producer, engineer (track 11)
- Neal Avron – mixing
- Bryan Fryzel – mixing (track 3)
- Joe LaPorta – mastering

Artwork

- These Quiet Studios – illustrations
- Mandy Lee – art direction and design, cover concept
- Glynis Carpenter – photography
- Joe Spix – art direction and design

== Charts ==
Chart (2015)	Peak position
US Billboard 200	31
US Digital Albums (Billboard)	15
US Top Alternative Albums (Billboard)	7
US Top Rock Albums (Billboard)	12
