= Waiting for the Dawn (The Mowgli's album) =

Studio album by The Mowgli's
- Released: June 18, 2013
- Recorded: 2012
- Studio: Captain Cuts Studio, Los Angeles, California, United States; Chalice Recording, Hollywood, California, United States; Emblem Studios, Calabasas, California, United States; Fresh Kills, Los Angeles, California, United States; Killingsworth, Valley Village, California, United States; Mid-Bronx Recordings, Hollywood, California, United States; St. Genevieve's Catholic Church, Panorama City, California, United States; Swinghouse Studios, Hollywood, California, United States
- Genre: Folk rock; Indie rock; Sunshine pop
- Length: 49:04
- Language: English
- Label: Photo Finish/Island
- Producer: Captain Cuts; Christian-James Hand; Josh Edmondson; Sam Hollander

The Mowgli's chronology
Sound the Drum (2012)	Waiting for the Dawn (2013)	Kids in Love (2015)

Waiting for the Dawn is a studio album by American indie rock band The Mowgli's, released on June 18, 2013 by Photo Finish Records/Island Records. The album and associated single "San Francisco" were the most successful of the band's career, placing on several charts.

== Reception ==
Writing for Alternative Press, Evan Lucy opines that this album "sounds tailor-made for warm summer days" and compares it to 1960s sunshine pop, but complaining that while the release makes "a passable soundtrack for your summer parties, you’re likely to remember little of it the next morning". Editors at AllMusic Guide chose this as an Album Pick among the band's catalog and scored it three out of five stars, with critic Matt Collar comparing the band favorably to diverse acts such as Fleetwood Mac and Grouplove and sums up that this album makes for "enjoyable, laid-back listening". A brief, negative review came from Spin, ranking it two out of 10 for having "tiring cavalcade of cornball folk shouts".

== Track listing ==
1. "San Francisco" (David Appelbaum, Colin Dieden, Katie Jayne Earl, Christian-James Hand, Joshua Hogan, Matthew Di Panni, Spencer Trent, and Michael Vincze) – 2:53
2. "Slowly, Slowly" (Appelbaum, Dieden, Earl, Hand, Hogan, Di Panni, Trent, and Vincze) – 4:05
3. "Waiting for the Dawn" (Appelbaum, Dieden, Earl, Hand, Hogan, Pete Mallinger, Di Panni, Trent, and Vincze) – 3:34
4. "Love Is Easy" (Appelbaum, Dieden, Earl, Hand, Hogan, Di Panni, Trent, and Vincze) – 4:08
5. "Clean Light" (Appelbaum, Dieden, Earl, Hand, Hogan, Di Panni, Trent, and Vincze) – 3:10
6. "Time" (Appelbaum, Dieden, Earl, Hand, Hogan, Di Panni, Trent, and Vincze) – 3:32
7. "Emily" (Appelbaum, Nate Campany, Dieden, Earl, Hogan, Sam Hollander, Di Panni, Trent, Vincze, and Andy Warren) – 3:33
8. "The Great Divide" (Appelbaum, Dieden, Earl, Hand, Hogan, Mallinger, Di Panni, Trent, and Vincze) – 3:07
9. "Say It, Just Say It" (Appelbaum, Evan "Kidd" Bogart, Dieden, Earl, Hogan, Jens Koerkemeir, Di Panni, Trent, Vincze, and Warren) – 3:20
10. "Leave It Up to Me" (Appelbaum, Alex Arias, Dieden, Earl, Hand, Hogan, Di Panni, Trent, Vincze, and Warren) – 3:28
11. "Carry Your Will" (Appelbaum, Dieden, Earl, Hand, Hogan, Di Panni, Trent, and Vincze) – 4:18
12. "Hi, Hey There, Hello" (Appelbaum, Dieden, Earl, Hand, Hogan, Di Panni, Trent, and Vincze) – 3:26
13. "We Are Free" (Appelbaum, Dieden, Earl, Hand, Hogan, Di Panni, Trent, and Vincze) – 6:30

iTunes bonus track

14. "See I'm Alive" (Appelbaum, Dieden, Earl, Hand, Hogan, Di Panni, Trent, and Vincze) – 4:46

== Personnel ==
The Mowgli's

- David Appelbaum
- Colin Dieden
- Katie Jayne Earl
- Joshua Hogan
- Matthew Di Panni
- Spencer Trent
- Michael Vincze
- Andy Warren

Additional personnel

- Alex Arias – drum engineering on all tracks except "Love Is Easy", engineering on all tracks except "Love Is Easy", tracking on all tracks except "Love Is Easy"
- Zack Atkinson – art direction, logo, package design
- David Baker – engineering
- Rob Beaton – mastering, mixing on all tracks except "Love Is Easy"
- Courtney Berman – photography
- Antony Bland – photography
- Captain Cuts – mixing on "Clean Light", production on "Clean Light"
- Zak Cassar – photography
- Donald Cassel – didjeridu on "We Are Fine"
- Samantha Cohen – photography
- Angela Corpuz – vocals on "We Are Fine"
- Charity Daw – backing vocals
- Dirty Hollywood – percussion on "Carry Your Will"
- Joel Doek – horn programming on "San Francisco"
- Josh Edmondson – engineering on "Emily", production on "Emily", programming on "Emily", backing vocals on "Emily"
- Mark Evitts – fiddle on "Emily", tenor guitar on "Emily", mandolin on "Emily"
- Kevin Gibbs – photography
- Christian-James Hand – engineering on "Emily", mixing on all tracks except "Love Is Easy", production on "Emily", programming on "Emily"
- Sam Hollander – backing vocals on "Emily", production on "Emily", programming on "Emily"
- Ari Judah – engineering on "Carry Your Will"
- Jens Koerkemeir – engineering on "Say It, Just Say It", production on "Say It, Just Say It"
- Timothy May – banjo on "Emily"
- Forrest Reda – photography
- Liana Sananda – photography
- Steve Shebby – engineering on "Emily", backing vocals on "Emily"
- Desi Stewart – artwork, illustrations
- Don Teschner – lap steel guitar on "We Are Fine"
- Deby Velasco – artwork, illustrations

== Sales and chart performance ==
Waiting for the Dawn had sold 38,000 copies by May 2015. The album placed on three charts published by American publication Billboard, peaking at 109 on the Billboard 200, second place on Top Heatseekers, and reaching 31 on Top Rock Albums.

Additionally, the single "San Francisco" had previously been featured on the album Sound the Drum and was also on this release. The single placed on several charts:

- Billboard Adult Alternative Songs: 2
- Billboard Alternative Songs: 13
- Billboard Rock Songs: 32
- Canadian rock/alternative chart: 23

The song was Recording Industry Association of America-certified gold.

== See also ==
- List of 2013 albums
