= Canal Room =

Music venue in Manhattan, New York City

Coordinates: 40°43′15.7″N 74°00′16.7″W

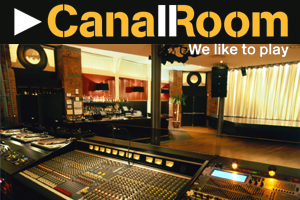

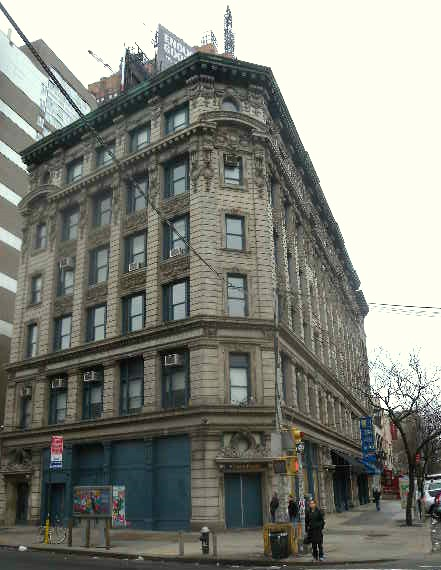
The exterior of the building which houses the Canal Room

Canal Room was a music venue located at 285 West Broadway between Canal Street and Lispenard Street in the Tribeca neighborhood of Manhattan, New York City. The space was formerly known as "Shine". It underwent a $1 million renovation in 2003 by owner Marcus Linial, a former J Records "star". The venue specialized in cover and tribute bands and accommodated approximately 450 people.
