= Photo Finish Records =

American independent record label

- Founded: 2006
- Founder: Matt Galle
- Distributor: UMG (via Virgin Music Group)
- Genre: Alternative rock; pop; hip hop; indie rock; electronica
- Country of origin: United States
- Location: New York City
- Official website: photofinishrecords.com

Photo Finish Records is an American independent record label founded by Matt Galle in 2006. Based in New York City, the label specializes in alternative rock, pop, and electronic artists. It was first distributed through Atlantic Records, then Universal Music Group. Virgin Music Group, which is owned by UMG, became its distributor in late 2019.

== History ==
=== Atlantic Records (2006–12) ===
In 2006, Photo Finish and Matt Galle signed a joint venture deal with Atlantic Records. Their first release was the debut self-titled five-song EP from the New-York-based post-hardcore band Envy on the Coast, followed by the debut EP and studio album from Washington-based rock band Danger Radio.

The label garnered major success with the debut album from the Colorado-based duo 3OH!3, WANT, which peaked at number 44 on the Billboard Top 200 Chart, while their song "Don't Trust Me" went to #1 on the Top 40 Charts, eventually selling over 3 million digital copies.

In August 2008, Photo Finish released the debut album by Anthony Green, Avalon, which debuted at number 44 on the Billboard charts, the label's most successful first-week performance for a release. In 2010, the Virginia-based band The Downtown Fiction’s song I Just Wanna Run played on the season premiere of Jersey Shore; the track ultimately went Gold.

=== Universal Music Group (2012–present) ===
In 2012, Galle brought the label to Island Def Jam and Republic Records, distributed by Universal Music Group.

In October of that year, Photo Finish released the EP Love’s Not Dead by The Mowgli's. The accompanying single “San Francisco” became iTunes’ Single of the Week, peaking at #12 on the Alternative Music Chart and #3 on the AAA Radio Chart. Subsequent releases included their debut album Waiting for the Dawn in 2013 and the follow-up Kids in Love in 2014.

2014 also saw the release of Reflections, the debut EP of the New-York-City based band MisterWives, the title song of which became iTunes’ Single of the Week in January and peaked at #13 on the Billboard rock chart, ultimately going Gold in the U.S. and selling 2 million (equivalents), followed by the band’s debut album Our Own House in 2015. That year, MisterWives was chosen as an MTV “Artist to Watch.”

After being chosen for an Apple AirPods commercial, the song “Down” by Marian Hill went Platinum and sold nearly six million track equivalents worldwide, reaching #10 on the Top 40, #13 at Rhythmic, #15 at Alternative, and #17 on Hot AC Radio, while at the same time becoming the most-Shazam’d song in the U.S., according to Rolling Stone magazine.

==== Caroline Distribution/Virgin Music Label & Artist Services (2016–present) ====
In 2016, Photo Finish made a distribution deal with Caroline Distribution, establishing the label as an independent entity to work with artists including SHAED, ROZES, guardin, Joan, Handsome Ghost, and Lakeview.

In September 2016, Photo Finish released Just Wanna See, the debut EP by SHAED, whose single "Name On It" was the featured track for a Victoria's Secret commercial. SHAED’s single "Trampoline", from their follow-up EP Melt, was featured in a MacBook Air commercial in October, 2018, and was the #1 song on Alternative Radio for the entire year of 2019, garnering over 3 billion in US radio audience and over 7 million worldwide sales (equivalents). The song reached number one on the US Billboard Alternative Songs chart and went double platinum in the United States, Canada, and India.

In 2017, Photo Finish released the debut EP by ROZES. ROZES’s song "Halfway There" was the official anthem to the 2019 Women's March on NYC via The Women's March Alliance.

== Artists ==
- All Time Low
- Handsome Ghost
- Rozes
- Culpriit
- Mckenna Grace
- guardin
- Elliot Lee
- Lakeview
- Moody Joody
- She's Green
- joan
- 3OH!3
- The Maine
- MisterWives

=== Former artists ===
- Brick + Mortar
- Clinton Sparks
- Danger Radio
- The Downtown Fiction
- Envy on the Coast
- Fighting with Wire
- Anthony Green
- Hit the Lights
- I Fight Dragons
- Marian Hill
- The Mowgli's
- New Medicine
- Paper Rival
- Rival Schools
- SHAED
- The Strypes
- 93feetofsmoke

== Discography ==
=== Studio albums / EPs ===
Year	Album details	Chart positions		
Year	Album details	US	AUS	CAN
2023	Bittersweet 16: Artist: Mckenna Grace; Released: March 3, 2023; Genre: Pop-Rock	—	—	—
2021	PAW Patrol: The Movie (Music from The Motion Picture): Artist: Various Artists; Released: August 1, 2021; Genre: Pop-punk, alternative rock, pop, post-grunge, emo, indie	—	—	—
2018	Melt EP: Artist: Shaed; Released: September 21, 2018; Genre: indie	—	—	—
2018	I Don't Know Where I'm Going, but I'm on My Way EP: Artist: Rozes; Released: August 24, 2018; Genre: Pop	—	—	—
2018	Autop$y: Artist: L.I.F.T.; Released: June 8, 2018; Genre: Alternative	—	—	—
2018	Welcome Back: Artist: Handsome Ghost; Released: February 9, 2018; Genre: indie	—	—	—
2017	Connect the Dots: Artist: MisterWives; Released: Spring 2017; Genre: Alternative	—	—	—
2016	The Brilliant Glow: Artist: Handsome Ghost; Released: Fall 2016; Genre: Alternative	—	—	—
2016	Where'd Your Weekend Go?: Artist: The Mowgli's; Released: Fall 2016; Genre: Alternative	—	—	—
2016	Just Wanna See EP: Artist: Shaed; Released: Fall 2016; Genre: Alternative	—	—	—
2015	Kids in Love: Artist: The Mowgli's; Released: Spring 2015; Genre: Alternative	—	—	—
2015	Our Own House: Artist: MisterWives; Released: Spring 2015; Genre: Alternative	—	—	—
2013	Snapshot: Artist: The Strypes; Released: Sept 9, 2013; Genre: Alternative	—	—	—
2013	Waiting for the Dawn: Artist: The Mowgli's; Released: Winter 2013; Genre: Alternative	—	—	—
2013	Omens: Artist: 3OH!3; Released: June 18, 2013; Genre: Alternative	—	—	—
2012	Beautiful Things: Artist: Anthony Green; Released: January 13, 2012; Genre: Alternative rock	—	—	—
2011	Let's Be Animals: Artist: The Downtown Fiction; Released: Spring 2011; Genre: Pop punk	—	—	—
2010	Welcome to the Breakdown: Artist: I Fight Dragons; Released: November 30, 2010; Genre: Alternative rock	—	—	—
2010	Race You to the Bottom: Artist: New Medicine; Released: September 27, 2010; Genre: Hard rock	104	—	—
2009	Live Session EP (iTunes Exclusive): Artist: 3OH!3; Released: August 11, 2009; Genre: Alternative rock	—	—	—
2008	Avalon: Artist: Anthony Green; Released: August 5, 2008; Genre: Acoustic, Alternative rock	44	—	—
2008	Want: Artist: 3OH!3; Released: July 8, 2008; Genre: Electronica, Crunkcore	44	4	47
2008	Used and Abused: Artist: Danger Radio; Released: July 8, 2008; Genre: Power pop	198	—	—
2007	Punch Your Lights Out EP: Artist: Danger Radio; Released: November 5, 2007; Genre: Alternative rock	—	—	—
2007	Lucy Gray: Artist: Envy on the Coast; Released: August 7, 2007; Genre: Alternative rock	11 Heatseakers	—	—
2006	Envy on the Coast EP: Artist: Envy on the Coast; Released: November 7, 2006; Genre: Alternative rock	—	—	—

=== Singles ===
Year	Artist	Single	Peak chart positions									Certifications	Album
Year	Artist	Single	US Hot 100	Billboard US Pop	CAN	AUS	FIN	NZ	UK	IRE	GER	Certifications	Album
2008	3OH!3	"Don't Trust Me"	7	1	6	3	5	8	21	17	95	AUS: Platinum; US: 2× Platinum	Want (and Deluxe Edition)
2009	3OH!3	"Starstrukk" (featuring Katy Perry)	66	25	31	4	—	16	3	—	—	US: Gold	Want (and Deluxe Edition)
"—" denotes releases that did not chart													Want (and Deluxe Edition)
