= Near future =

Near future is future which is relatively near.

Near future or Near Future may also refer to:

- Near future (grammar), a grammatical tense
- Timeline of the near future, planned and predicted near future events
- Near future in fiction
- "The Near Future", a 1919 song by Irving Berlin
- The Near Future (film), a 2012 Canadian short drama film directed by Sophie Goyette
- The Near Future (album), a 2014 album by I Fight Dragons
