= I Fight Dragons =

American chiptune-based rock band

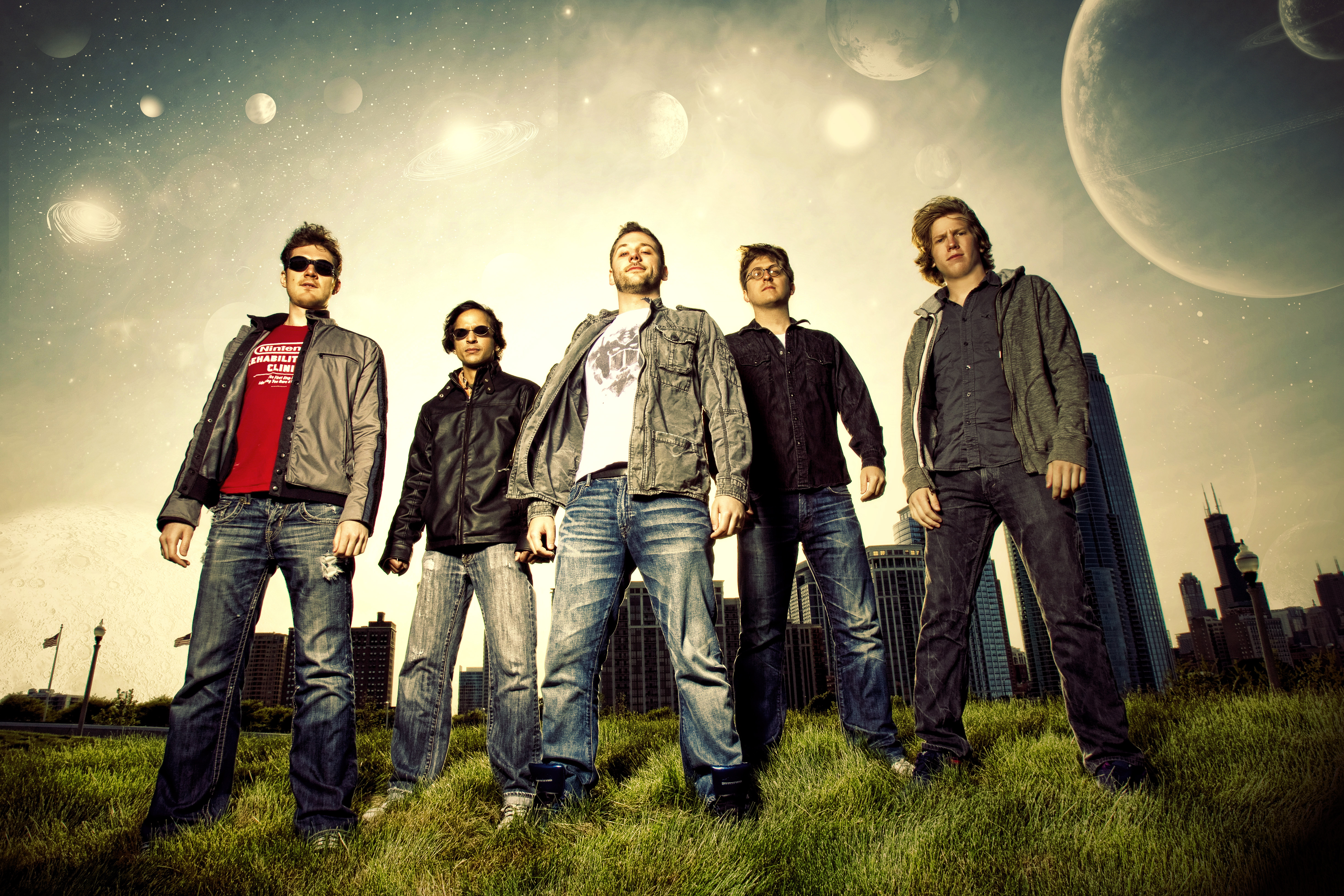
- I Fight Dragons in a press photo from 2011. From left to right: Bill Prokopow, Hari Rao, Brian Mazzaferri, Packy Lundholm, Chad Van Dahm.

Background information
- Also known as: IFD
- Origin: Chicago, Illinois, U.S.
- Genres: Geek rock; chiptune; pop punk; pop rock; Nintendocore; electronic rock; alternative rock
- Instruments: NES; SNES; NES Advantage; Power Pad; Power Glove; LSDJ; Guitar Hero controller; guitar; bass guitar; drums; vocals; keyboards; synthesizers
- Years active: 2008–present (hiatus: 2023–present)
- Labels: Photo Finish; Atlantic
- Members: Brian Mazzaferri; Hari Rao; Packy Lundholm; Chad Van Dahm; Bill Prokopow
- Past members: Laura Green; Mike Mentzer; Dave Midell
- Website: ifightdragons.com

I Fight Dragons is an American chiptune-based rock band from Chicago. Their music is a combination of rock with chiptune, featuring music made using Nintendo Game Boys and Nintendo Entertainment Systems, a genre also known as Nintendocore. To date they have released four full-length albums: 2011's KABOOM!, which came out on Photo Finish / Atlantic Records, 2014's The Near Future, which they self-released after raising over $100,000 on Kickstarter through their "Project Atma" project, 2019's Canon Eyes, and 2021's Side Quests: B-Sides and Rarities. They have also released two EPs, 2009's Cool Is Just a Number and 2010's Welcome to the Breakdown. Their music has been featured on Nintendo Video as well as on the WWE, and they wrote and performed the theme song for ABC's The Goldbergs. They have toured the US with MC Chris and Whole Wheat Bread in 2009, 3OH!3, Cobra Starship, and Travie McCoy in 2010, the Protomen in 2011, and they were on the entire 2012 and 2014 Vans Warped Tours. They went on their first national headlining tour, "The War of Cyborg Liberation Tour", with openers MC Lars and Skyfox in 2012. From 2010 until 2012 they were signed to Photo Finish / Atlantic Records, but in fall 2012 they won their release from the label. Since 2014, they have toured sporadically as well as playing annual headlining shows at Chicago's Lincoln Hall.

== History ==
=== Cool Is Just a Number (2009–2010) ===
I Fight Dragons was formed in 2008, with all five members hailing from Chicago. Their first EP, Cool Is Just a Number, was self-released in 2009. In June, 2009, Mike Mentzer left the band to pursue his own solo career and was replaced by Packy Lundholm, who had played drums on the band's first EP, and has since played lead guitar in the band. On July 25, 2009, I Fight Dragons headlined the Metro in Chicago for the first time. This show was captured as a Live DVD, and a limited run of 500 numbered and signed copies of the DVD, entitled "Dragon Fight!", were released in January 2010. In August 2009, Dave Midell left the band to pursue humanitarian causes. Chad Van Dahm was brought in as the new drummer.

The band signed with manager J.J. Italiano and with booking agent Gabriel Apodaca of The Agency Group. in September 2009, signing their first major label contract. I Fight Dragons went on their first National Tour with punk group Whole Wheat Bread and nerdcore rapper MC Chris in October of that same year. They played 45 US shows from 1 October to 24 November.

=== Welcome to the Breakdown (2010) ===
I Fight Dragons signed with Photo Finish / Atlantic Records in early 2010, and went on to appear on the MTV "Too Fast For Love" tour, opening for 3OH!3, Cobra Starship, and Travie McCoy from April–June 2010. In his June, 2010, concert review, Rick Florino described the band as "one of the most unique, uplifting and unforgettable new acts on the scene." World Wrestling Entertainment announced that their song "Money" from their 2009 E.P. Cool Is Just a Number would be used as the theme song for the inaugural Money In The Bank Pay Per View, which helped to boost the band's popularity.

On November 27, 2010, I Fight Dragons released their second EP, Welcome to the Breakdown. They indicated that this EP consisted of songs written for their Photo Finish / Atlantic Records debut album, but which ended up not having a place on the album and so were released as an EP instead.

=== KABOOM! (2011–2012) ===
KABOOM! was released October 24, 2011. Its third single Save World Get Girl was released May 3, 2012, and was featured on Nintendo Video in late 2012.

=== Kickstarter album and The Near Future (2013–2014) ===
On January 17, 2013 "cRaZie$" was released as the third and final single from KABOOM!. The band was in the studio recording new music for an EP to be released in 2013. The band also released an Internet-only album composed of demos from 2010 and 2011 that were in various stages of development, but for various reasons never made it on KABOOM! titled DEMOlition: Songs That Didn't Make It On KABOOM!. On June 21, 2013, "Move" was released as a single from DEMOlition and the music video features the four heroines of Phantom Breaker: Battle Grounds. In April 2013, the band launched "Project Atma", a Kickstarter project to fund their new album, The Near Future. On June 13, 2014, the band announced that the release date for The Near Future would be September 16, 2014, and released the track "No Strings". On August 28, 2014, the band announced that, due to manufacturing issues with the albums, the release date would be pushed further back. The Near Future was released publicly on December 9, 2014, and hit #5 on the Billboard Vinyl Album Charts the week of its release. On December 20, I Fight Dragons played an album release show for The Near Future to a capacity crowd at Chicago's Lincoln Hall.

=== Patreon page, Canon Eyes and Side Quest: B-Sides And Rarities (2017–2022) ===
On August 7, 2017, the band launched their Patreon page that would be used for raising funds for new albums, which they called Album Adventures. This also saw the return of band member Bill Prokopow. Digital copies of the finished album, titled Canon Eyes, were sent to all Patreons who contributed $15 or more on August 5, 2019. On September 16, 2019, the band released the first single from the album, titled "Punch Drunk Destiny". The album was released to the public on December 9, 2019, followed by a sold-out album release show at Chicago's Lincoln Hall.

On October 6, 2020, the band started raising funds for Album Adventure 2. As part of this Patreon campaign the band will release previously unreleased tracks exclusively for Patrons. On July 12, the band announced via Twitter that an album titled Side Quest: B-Sides And Rarities will release on December 8, 2021.

=== Hiatus (2023–present) ===
On October 9, 2023, the band announced that they would go on hiatus after one last show on December 30, 2023 in Chicago, citing the decision to go on hiatus as "the right one for the band members for now."

== Musical style ==
I Fight Dragons' musical style has generally been regarded as geek rock, chiptune, pop punk, pop rock, Nintendocore, electronic rock, alternative rock, electropop, and power pop.

== Band members ==
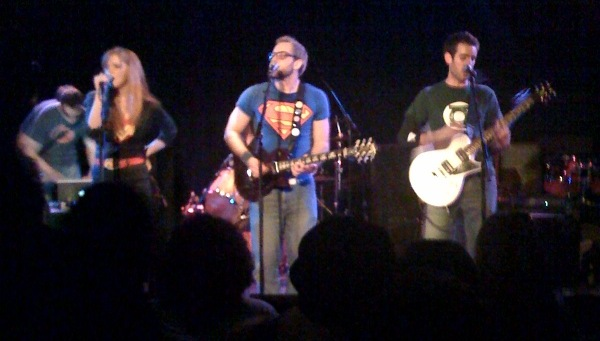
I Fight Dragons performing at Martyrs', Chicago, in 2009

Current members

- Brian Mazzaferri - lead vocals, rhythm guitar, NES (2008–present), lead guitar (2008–2009)
- Bill Prokopow - keyboards, backing vocals, NES, NES Advantage, Power Pad, NES Zapper, Guitar Hero controller (2008–2014, 2017–present)
- Hari Rao - bass, NES (2008–present)
- Packy Lundholm - backing vocals, NES, SNES (2008–present), lead guitar (2009–present), drums (2008–2010)
- Chad Van Dahm - drums, NES (2009–present)

Former members

- Mike Mentzer - rhythm guitar, backing vocals, NES, SNES (2008–2009)
- Dave Midell - drums, NES (2009)
- Laura Green - backing vocals, NES, SNES, NES Advantage, Power Pad, Power Glove (2008–2010)

Timeline

== Discography ==
=== Studio albums ===
Title	Album details
KABOOM!	Released: October 25, 2011; Label: Photo Finish Records/Atlantic Records; Format: Digital download, CD
DEMOlition - 12 Demos That Didn't Make KABOOM!	Released: February 21, 2013; Label: Self-released; Format: Digital download
The Near Future	Released: December 9, 2014; Label: Self-released; Format: Digital download, vinyl
Canon Eyes	Released: December 9, 2019; Label: Self-released; Format: Digital download, streaming, CD, vinyl

=== Compilation albums ===
Title	Album details
Cool Is Just A Number / Welcome To The Breakdown 10th Anniversary	Released: February 19, 2021; Label: Self-released; Format: Vinyl
Side Quest: B-Sides & Rarities	Released: December 18, 2021; Label: Self-released; Format: Digital download, streaming, CD, vinyl

=== Extended plays ===
Title	EP details
Cool Is Just a Number	Released: February 6, 2009 (original), May 2010 (re-release); Label: Self-released (original), Photo Finish Records (re-release); Format: Digital download, CD
Welcome to the Breakdown	Released: November 30, 2010; Label: Atlantic Records; Format: Digital download, CD

=== DVDs ===
Title	Details
Dragon Fight! I Fight Dragons Live At The Metro	Released: 2009; Label: Photo Finish Records; Format: DVD

=== Singles ===
Year	Title	Album
2011	"KABOOM!"	KABOOM!
2011	"The Geeks Will Inherit the Earth"	KABOOM!
2012	"Save World Get Girl"	KABOOM!
2013	"cRaZie$"	KABOOM!
2013	"Move"	DEMOlition - 12 Demos That Didn't Make KABOOM!
2019	"Punch Drunk Destiny"	Canon Eyes
2019	"Artifact"	Canon Eyes
2019	"Oh the Places You'll Go"	Canon Eyes
2019	"Not Done Yet"	Canon Eyes
2019	"The Devil You Know"	Canon Eyes
2019	"A New Brain"	Canon Eyes
2021	"The Taste For Glory"	Side Quest: B-Sides & Rarities
2021	"Move"	Side Quest: B-Sides & Rarities
2021	"Chain Wallet Rock"	Side Quest: B-Sides & Rarities
2021	"Circles"	Side Quest: B-Sides & Rarities

=== Compilations and soundtracks ===
- 2017 - The Goldbergs Mixtape
  - Features the track "Rewind" (The Goldbergs Main Theme)

=== Music videos ===
List of music videos with director(s)
Title	Year	Director(s)
"Money"	2009	Encargado
The Faster The Treadmill	2010	BarfQuestion Films
"KABOOM!"	2011	—N/a
"The Geeks Will Inherit the Earth"	2011	—N/a
"Working"	2012	Kera "162" Hildebrandt
"Save World Get Girl"	2012	Josh Forbes
"cRaZie$"	2013	Keith O'Hara
"Move"	2013	Gail Salamanca
"Pretend"	2014	Michael Cooney
"A New Brain"	2021	Henry Lutts
"Chain Wallet Rock"	2021	Tim Labonte

== In popular culture ==
- I Fight Dragons wrote the theme song, "Rewind", for the television show The Goldbergs.
- Their song "No Kontrol" was featured in commercials for season 14 of Big Brother.
- Their song "Money" was the official theme song for WWE's July 2010 Pay-Per-View Money in the Bank.
- Their song "Heads Up, Hearts Down" was featured in the series finale of The Hills.
- Their song "Disaster Hearts" was featured in a long-form commercial for NCIS.
- Their song "Hero" was featured in the credits sequence for Magic: The Gathering – Duels of the Planeswalkers 2014.
