= Cool Is Just a Number =

EP by I Fight Dragons
- Released: February 6, 2009 (original); May 2010 (re-release)
- Recorded: 2008
- Genres: Electronic rock; chiptune; indie rock; pop rock
- Length: 21:53
- Labels: Self-released (original); Photo Finish (2010 re-release)
- Producers: Bill Prokopow; Brian Mazzaferri

I Fight Dragons chronology
Cool Is Just a Number (2009)	Welcome to the Breakdown (2010)

Alternate cover
- 2010 re-release cover art

Cool Is Just a Number is the debut extended play by the American chiptune-based rock band I Fight Dragons. Forming in 2008, the band self-released the EP in 2009, and it was later re-released on Photo Finish Records in May 2010 with the extra track, "Don't You". The track "Money" was used for WWE's Money in the Bank pay-per-view event in 2010. Cool Is Just a Number was meant as an experiment, with band frontman Brian Mazzaferri later stating in an interview: "The people that played on it just sort of looked at me funny when I told them it was going to be a Nintendo Rock record." In a review for Live in Limbo, critic Lee Clifford complimented the EP and recommended readers buy it on iTunes.

== Track listing ==
All tracks are written by Brian Mazzaferri.

No.	Title	Length
1.	"Power Up (Intro)"	0:14
2.	"Don't You" (2010 re-release only)	3:41
3.	"The Faster the Treadmill"	3:46
4.	"Money"	3:20
5.	"Heads Up, Hearts Down"	3:18
6.	"No One Likes Superman Anymore"	3:44
7.	"With You"	3:49
Total length:		21:53

== Personnel ==
Credits adapted from the album's liner notes.

- Brian Mazzaferri – Lead Vocals, Guitar
- Mike Mentzer – Vocals, Guitar
- Hari Rao – Bass
- Laura Green – Vocals
- Packy Lundholm – Drums
- Bill Prokopow – Vocals, Keys
