= Welcome to the Breakdown =

EP by I Fight Dragons
- Released: November 30, 2010
- Genre: Electronic rock; chiptune; alternative rock; electropop; geek rock
- Label: Atlantic
- Producer: Bill Prokopow, Brian Mazzaferri

I Fight Dragons chronology
Cool Is Just a Number (2009)	Welcome to the Breakdown (2010)	KABOOM! (2011)

Welcome to the Breakdown is the second extended play by American chiptune-based rock band I Fight Dragons. It was released under Atlantic Records, both on iTunes and their website, the latter offering the IFD exclusive "She's Got Sorcery" with the digital download. The title track "Welcome to the Breakdown" and the song "She's Got Sorcery" were both sent out via e-mail to all mailing list subscribers prior to the release of the album.

The band would then continue to release the second exclusive bonus track of the album, "I Fight Ganon (Studio Version)", through the IFD Mailing list. The track is a full studio recording of their popular recreation of the theme to the video game series, The Legend of Zelda.

== Track listing ==
All tracks are written by Brian Mazzaferri, except where noted.

No.	Title	Length
1.	"Welcome to the Breakdown"	3:01
2.	"No Kontrol"	2:26
3.	"The Power of Love" (Huey Lewis and the News cover, written by Huey Lewis, Johnny Colla, and Chris Hayes)	3:59
4.	"Proxima Centauri"	0:57
5.	"Give It Up"	3:33
6.	"Not I"	4:00
7.	"Just Decide"	3:48
8.	"She's Got Sorcery" (website digital download exclusive)
9.	"I Fight Ganon (Studio Version)" (mailing list exclusive)

== Personnel ==
- Brian Mazzaferri – lead vocals, guitar
- Packy Lundholm – vocals, guitar
- Hari Rao – bass
- Chad Van Dahm - drums
- Bill Prokopow – vocals, keyboards, production
