= Kaboom! (album) =

KABOOM!

Studio album by I Fight Dragons
- Released: October 25, 2011
- Genres: Electronic rock; chiptune; power pop; Nintendocore; rock
- Length: 42:02
- Label: Photo Finish/Atlantic
- Producers: Matt Mahaffey; Bill Prokopow

I Fight Dragons chronology
Welcome to the Breakdown (2010)	KABOOM! (2011)	DEMOlition - 12 Demos That Didn't Make KABOOM! (2010)

Singles from KABOOM!
- 1. "KABOOM!" Released: September 26, 2011; 2. "The Geeks Will Inherit the Earth" Released: October 11, 2011; 3. "Save World Get Girl" Released: May 3, 2012; 4. "cRaZie$" Released: January 17, 2013

KABOOM! is the debut studio album by American chiptune-based rock band I Fight Dragons, released in 2011 by Photo Finish Records. When the band won their release from the record label, they started offering it for free on their site. This has, however, been replaced with the band's newest album, Canon Eyes.

Versions of the band's discography on USB Dogtags, released on the official online store, included an exclusive piano-ballad version of a track, titled "I Will Wait For You If You Do For Me" at the end of the album.

== Track listing ==
All tracks are written by Brian Mazzaferri, except where noted.

No.	Title	Length
1.	"Fanfare"	0:30
2.	"KABOOM!" (Brian Mazzaferri/Matt Mahaffey)	3:16
3.	"Save World Get Girl" (Mazzaferri/Mahaffey)	2:47
4.	"cRaZie$" (Mazzaferri/Mahaffey)	2:59
5.	"Gloria (Interlude)"	0:53
6.	"My Way" (Mazzaferri/Mahaffey)	3:27
7.	"With You" (feat. Kina Grannis)	3:48
8.	"Fight For You" (Mazzaferri/Mahaffey)	3:03
9.	"The Geeks Will Inherit The Earth" (Mazzaferri/Greg Wells/Nasri Atweh)	3:08
10.	"Disaster Hearts"	3:30
11.	"Don't You?"	3:45
12.	"Working"	3:03
13.	"Before I Wake"	3:57
14.	"Suburban Doxology"	3:55

Bonus track
No.	Title	Length
19.	"I Will Wait For You If You Do For Me"	2:46

== Personnel ==
I Fight Dragons

- Brian Mazzaferri - lead vocals, acoustic guitar, chiptune (NES, SNES, NES Advantage, NES Power Pad, NES Zapper, Rock Band Guitar, Game Boy, Atari 2600, Commodore 64, Omnichord)
- Packy Lundholm - vocals, electric guitar
- Bill Prokopow - vocals, keyboards, piano, chiptune
- Hari Rao - bass
- Chad Van Dahm - drums

Additional musicians

- Kina Grannis - vocals on "With You"
- 2010-2011 Glenbrook South High School Choir - vocals on "Suburban Doxology"
- Matt Mahaffey - chiptune

Production

- Matt Mahaffey - production, recording, mixing, engineering
- Bill Prokopow - additional production, mixing
- Chris Athens - mastering
- Ryan Mauskopf - cover art
- Alex R. Kirzhner - art direction, design
- Carolyn Tracey - packaging production
