= Rhythm game accessories =

Type of gaming equipment

Rhythm game accessories are often required to play rhythm games available for various consoles, such as the PlayStation 2, PlayStation 3, Wii, and Xbox 360. These include dance pads, guitar controllers, drum controllers, microphones and turntable controllers. With the exception of microphones, these controllers can generally be used to control any game (rhythm or otherwise), but have limited inputs, making them impractical for most games.

Rhythm game controllers are generally cross-compatible with other rhythm games. For example, the drum-kit controller included with Guitar Hero World Tour functions properly when used in Rock Band games. Some functionality may be diminished however. For example, Rock Band drum kits only feature 4 drum pads, as opposed to the 5 featured on the Guitar Hero versions. As a result, the in-game track must be changed to accommodate (done automatically by the software).

== Guitar controllers ==
Many officially licensed guitar controllers have been released, mostly affiliated with either the Guitar Hero or Rock Band franchises. These controllers are shaped to resemble guitars but are generally smaller than their real-life counterparts.

Common features among these controllers (with the exception of Rock Band 3's "pro" guitar controllers) are a set of five colored "fret" buttons on the neck (green, red, yellow, blue and orange) a "strum bar" (around where the pickups on an electric guitar would be) and whammy bar (corresponding to its real-life position) on the body. Additionally, the PlayStation 3 and Xbox 360 controllers also feature a d-pad, start and select/back buttons and a Home/Guide button. For navigation within the system menus, the strum bar acts as "up" and "down" on the d-pad (the dedicated d-pad can also be used) while the fret buttons correspond to,,, and "L1" on PlayStation 3 or,,, and left-bumper on Xbox 360.

Guitar controllers for the PlayStation 2 may connect either to the system's controller ports or via USB; other than the original SG controllers, most PS2 controllers are wireless via a transceiver dongle. All those on the PlayStation 3 connect to the system via USB; most do so wirelessly via a USB transceiver dongle. On the Xbox 360, guitar controllers may be connected either by USB or wirelessly using the console's integrated 2.4 GHz wireless technology (dependent on the particular controller).

=== PlayStation 2 SG controllers ===
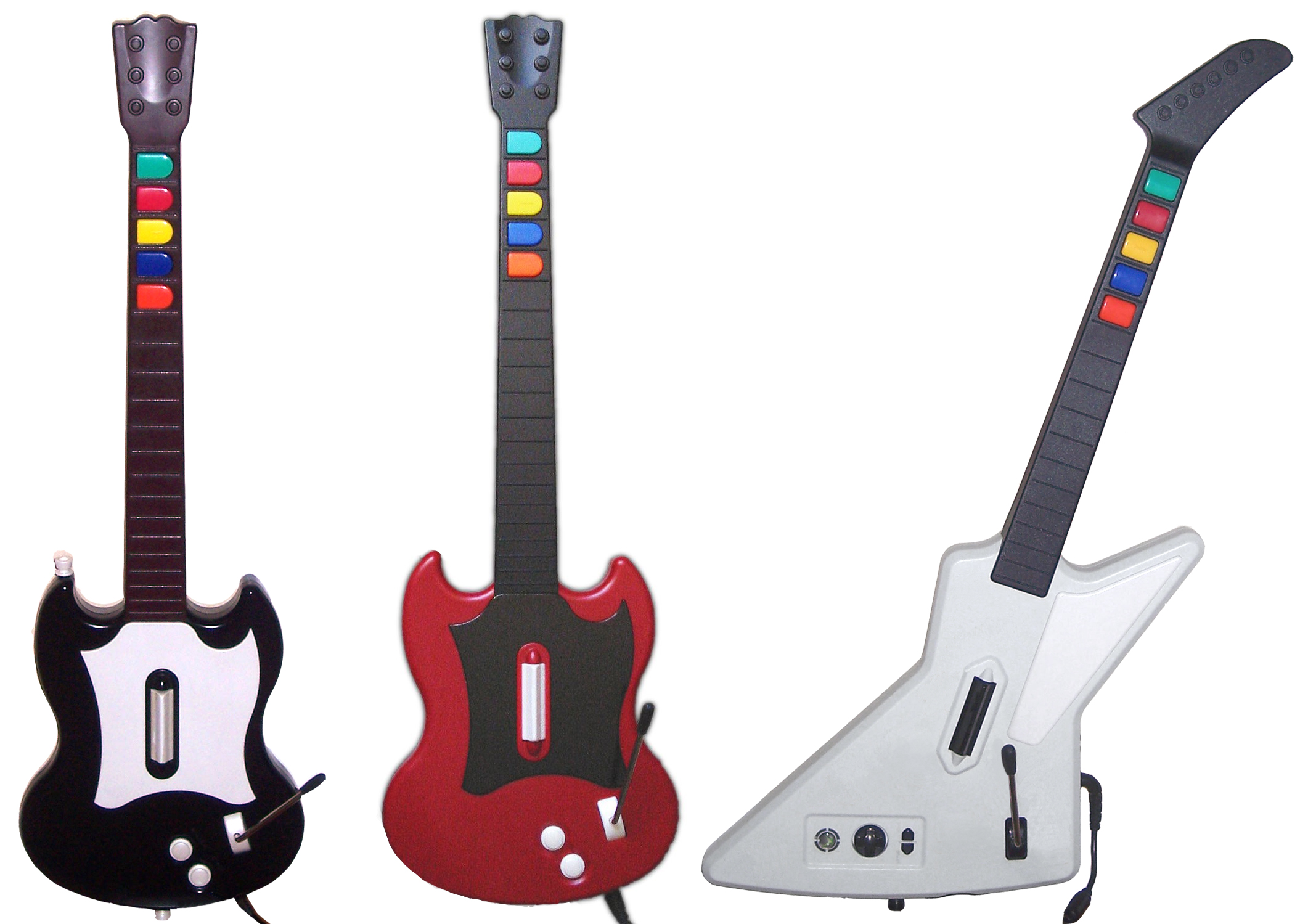
Guitar controllers, left to right: Guitar Hero SG, Guitar Hero II SG (for PlayStation 2) and X-Plorer (Xbox 360, Windows, OS X)

The PlayStation 2 SG controller is used for Guitar Hero. Another was used for Guitar Hero II. It is modeled after the Gibson SG guitar.

=== X-Plorer controller ===
The Xbox 360 version of Guitar Hero II came bundled with a newly designed controller known as the X-Plorer controller and modeled after the Gibson Explorer guitar. Like standard controllers, the X-Plorer features an expansion port which allows users to equip a wired headset for voice communication. The controller connects to the system via a USB cable. The controller was sold bundled with the Xbox 360 version of Guitar Hero II, some Xbox 360 bundles of Guitar Hero III: Legends of Rock, or available separately. It was also bundled with the Windows and Mac OS X releases of Guitar Hero III: Legends of Rock.

=== Guitar Hero III Kramer controller ===
The PlayStation 2 version of Guitar Hero III featured a guitar controller based around the Kramer Striker guitar.

=== Guitar Hero III / Aerosmith Les Paul controller ===
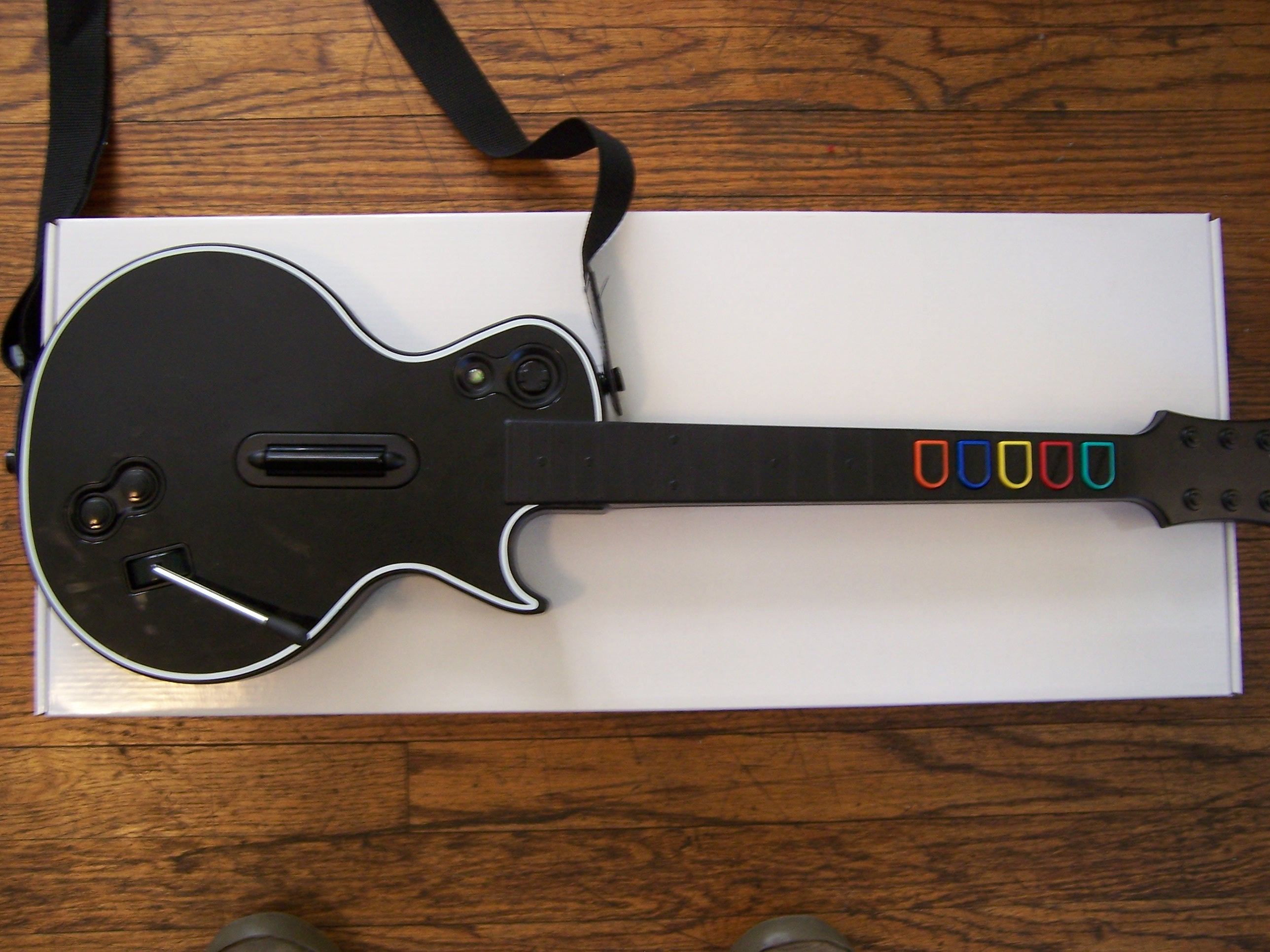
An Xbox 360 Les Paul controller

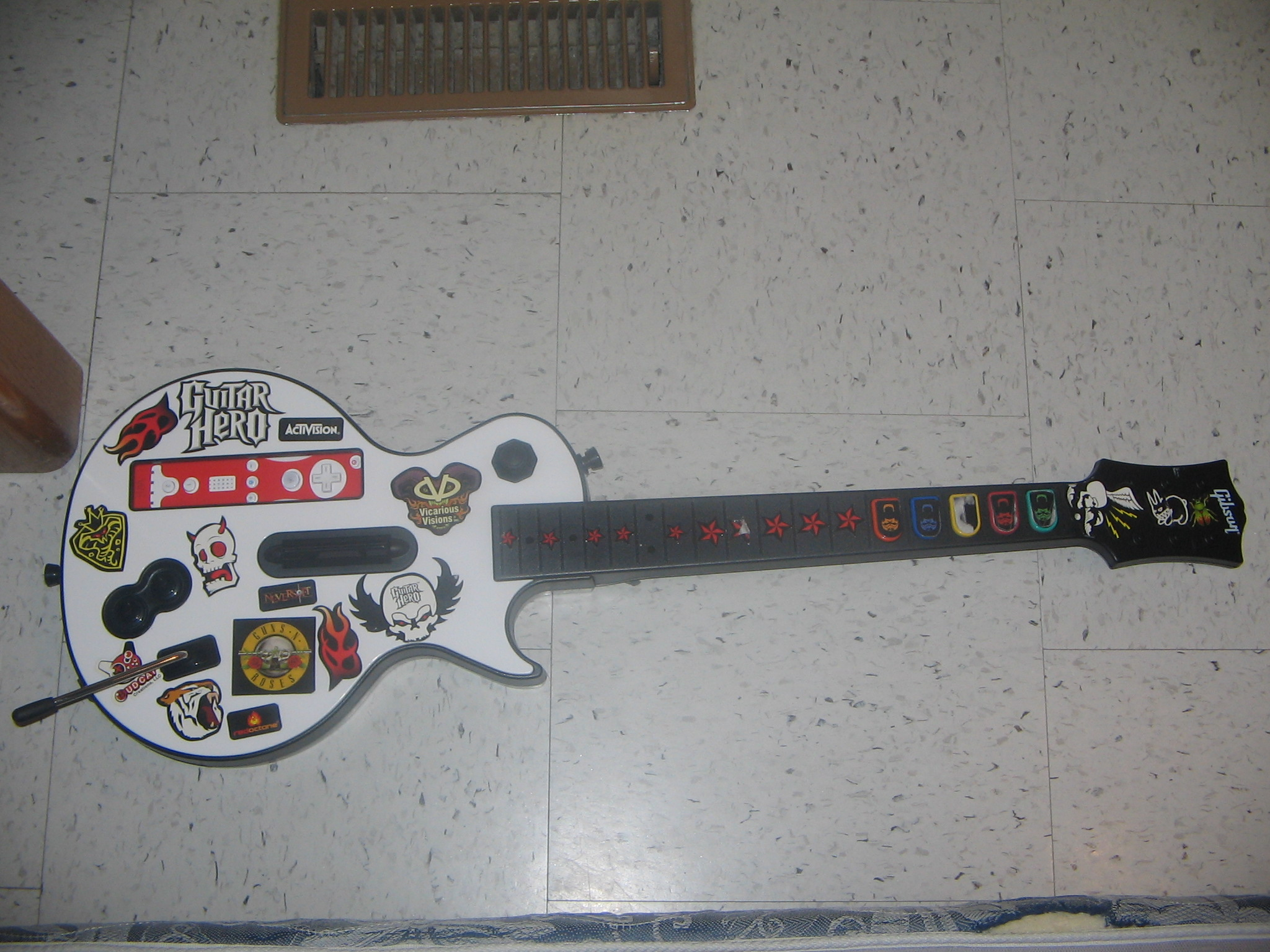
A Wii Les Paul controller with stickers (included with the controller) applied. The Wii Remote can be seen at the top left of the image and has a red silicone skin applied to it.

The PlayStation 3, Wii and Xbox 360 versions of Guitar Hero III: Legends of Rock came with a newly designed wireless guitar controller which was designed to resemble a Gibson Les Paul.

The PlayStation 3 version of the controller connects wirelessly via a USB dongle. The Xbox 360 version of the controller utilizes the same 2.4 GHz wireless technology as the official wireless controller, and as such when used in conjunction with the Wireless Gaming Receiver for Microsoft Windows, may be used with the PC version of Guitar Hero III: Legends of Rock. However, it is not officially supported by Aspyr Media (developer of the PC and Macintosh release), and shows up in game using the same icon as the X-Plorer. The Wii version connects directly to the Wii Remote via its accessory connector, while the Remote itself is held in a special cavity in the guitar controller.

Both the PlayStation 3 and Xbox 360 versions feature a d-pad and a Home/Guide button. The Wii version, however, utilises the Remote's Home button, and replaces the d-pad with an analog stick to facilitate use within the Wii's menus.

In addition to all the features of the earlier X-Plorer (Xbox 360) and SG (PS2) guitar controllers, the Les Paul controller features a detachable neck for easier storage and replacement, and customizable faceplates. The PlayStation 3 and Xbox 360 versions come with a black faceplate as standard, while the Wii version comes with a white one (which also features a rectangular window for Wii Remote access). The controller was also available separately, and bundled with Guitar Hero: Aerosmith. The Guitar Hero: Aerosmith version features a custom faceplate.

=== Guitar Hero World Tour / Metallica guitar controller ===
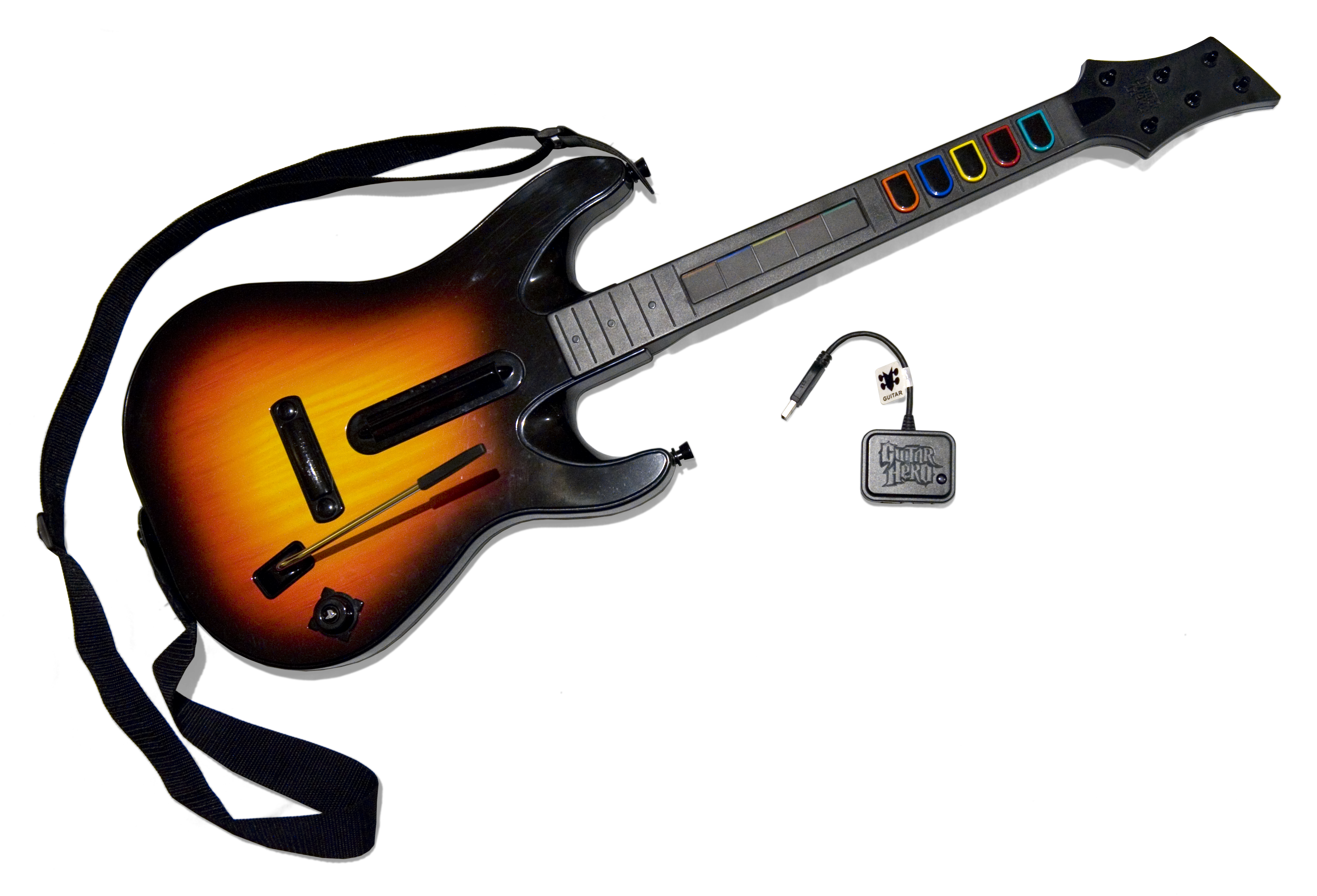
A PlayStation 3 Guitar Hero World Tour guitar controller and wireless receiver

Guitar Hero World Tour features another new controller known as the "Genericaster". Unlike previous guitar controllers, this is not modeled after a real guitar design, but resembles a Fender Stratocaster, hence its name. As well as a new shape, it features a longer, quieter strum bar, longer whammy bar, and repositioned start and select/back buttons. It also features a new, touch sensitive "solo section" on the neck. This is functionally similar to the "solo section" on Rock Band guitar controllers, but is not compatible with Rock Band games.

Like the Guitar Hero III Les Paul controller, the PlayStation 3 version of the Genericaster connects via a USB dongle, which also acts as a two-port USB hub, while the Wii version connects to the Wii Remote accessory connector and the Xbox 360 version connects via Microsoft's 2.4 GHz wireless technology. Also like the Les Paul, it features a detachable neck and customizable faceplates. This guitar was available separately, bundled with a Guitar Hero World Tour "guitar bundle" or "band bundle" (game, guitar controller, drum kit and microphone) or bundled with Guitar Hero: Metallica. Like the Aerosmith Les Paul, the Guitar Hero: Metallica version features a custom (Metallica themed) faceplate.

=== Guitar Hero 5 guitar controller ===
The guitar controller for Guitar Hero 5 retains the same basic design as the Guitar Hero World Tour Guitar Controller, but with some minor alterations. The strum bar is rubberized, the nuts on the headstock are made from chrome rather than plastic and the "solo section" of the neck is molded differently and is now digital rather than analog.

=== Guitar Hero: Warriors of Rock guitar controller ===
The guitar controller released for Guitar Hero: Warriors of Rock is, like the "World Tour" and "5" guitars, not based on a real guitar design. This controller differs from its predecessors however, in that it drops the touch-sensitive strip on the neck, and allows for complete replacement/customization of the body, rather than just faceplates as on previous controllers.

=== Guitar Hero Live guitar controller ===
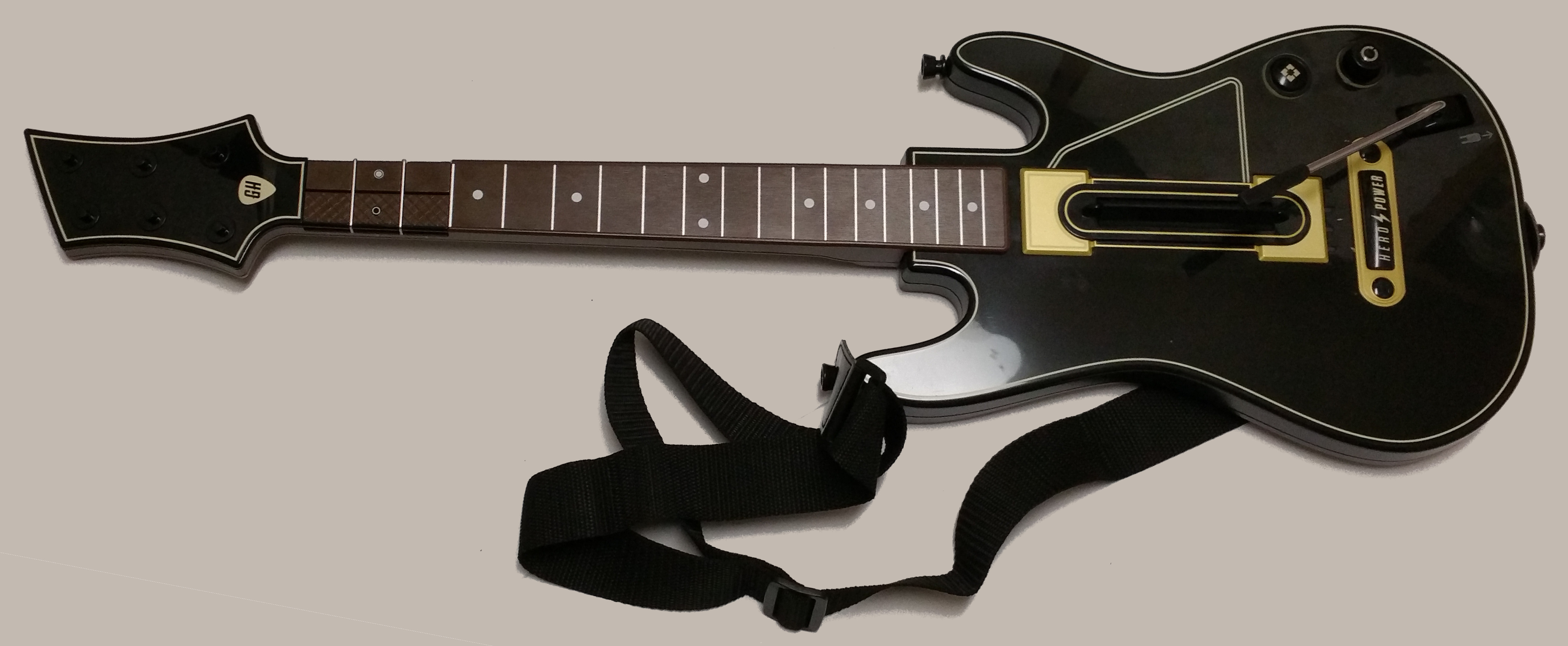
Guitar Hero Live Controller

Guitar Hero Live had a guitar controller with two rows of 3 buttons each. This renders the game incompatible with the older Guitar Hero controllers, as well as making the Guitar Hero Live controller incompatible with older games.

=== Rock Band guitar controller ===
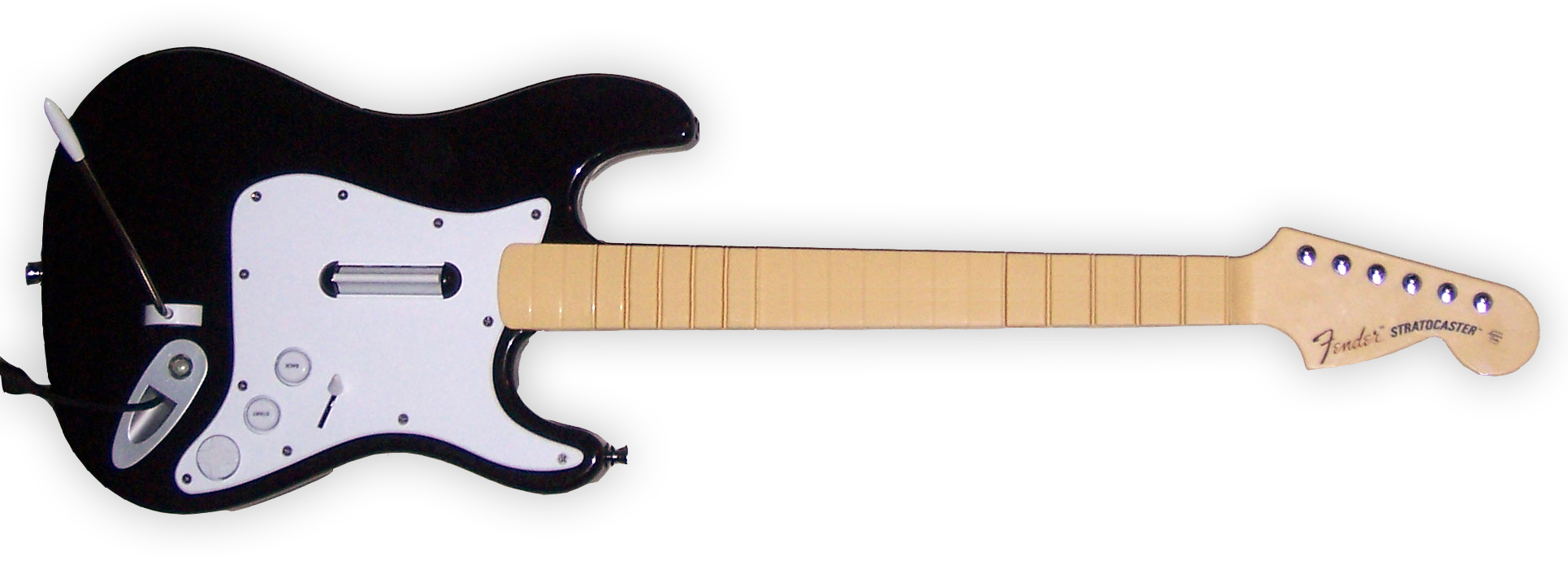
Rock Band Stratocaster guitar controller for the Xbox 360

The guitar controller for Rock Band is based on the Fender Stratocaster. It features two sets of fret buttons, one for standard gameplay, one for solo sections. It also features an effects switch unique to the Rock Band series of games. This controller connects via USB.

=== Rock Band 2 guitar controller ===
Like the guitar controller for Rock Band, the Rock Band 2 guitar controller is based on the Fender Stratocaster. It is an upgraded version of the original Rock Band guitar with a different finish and an integrated light/audio sensor to allow for automatic AV synchronization in Rock Band 2, Rock Band 3, Lego Rock Band, The Beatles: Rock Band, and Green Day: Rock Band.

=== Rock Band 2 Fender Precision bass guitar controller ===
Modeled after the Fender Precision Bass guitar, this controller is designed specifically for use in the bass guitar tracks on Rock Band 2 (and other rhythm games). It lacks the whammy bar found on "standard" guitar controllers, and instead uses a knob. A second knob is also present to switch between various effects within Rock Band games, and a third knob acts as the start and select buttons by rotating it clockwise or counterclockwise, respectively. It also features a split strum-bar, allowing more accurate emulation of dual-fingered up-strumming used to play real bass guitars.

=== The Beatles: Rock Band guitar controllers ===
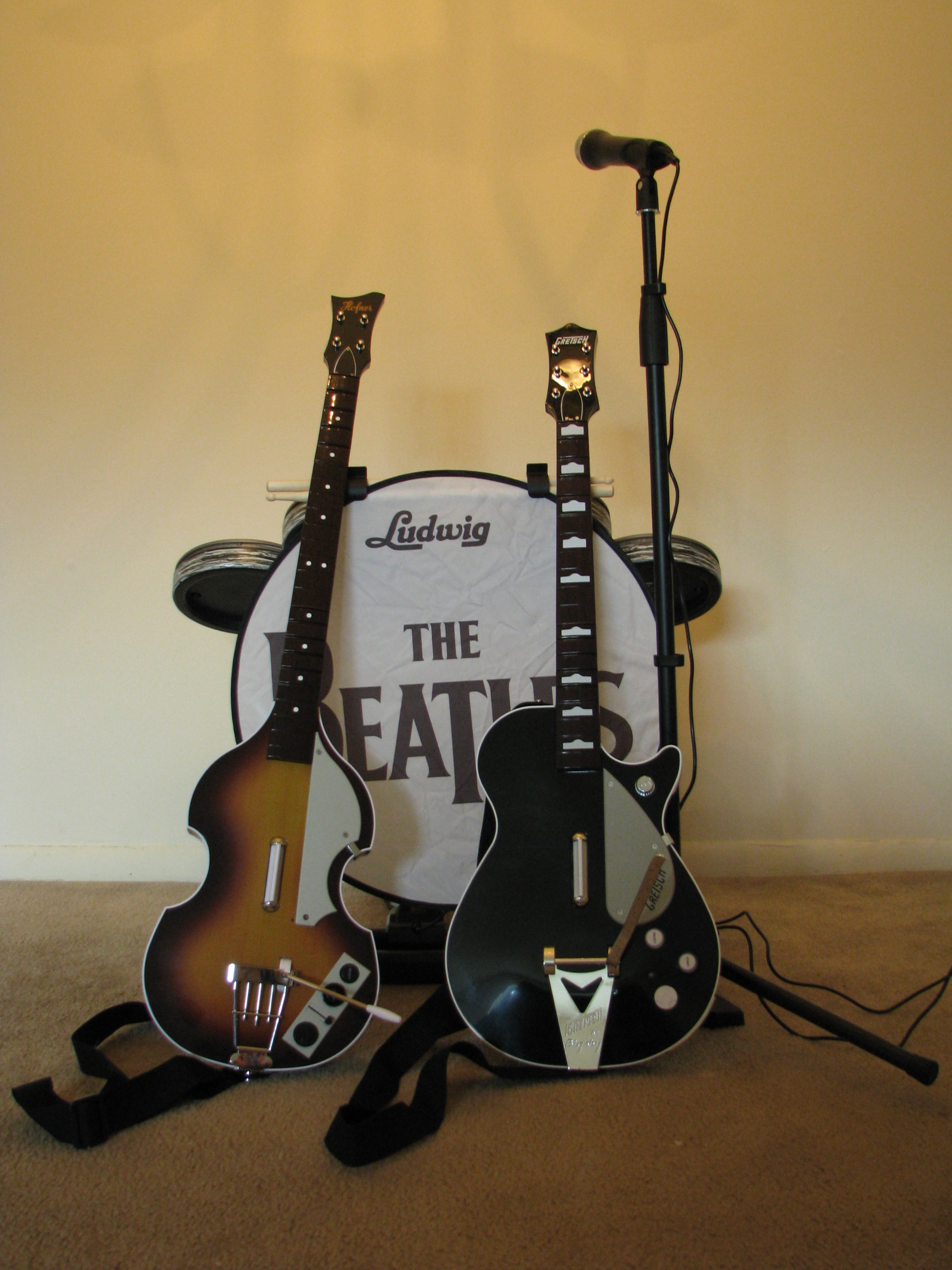
A set of The Beatles: Rock Band instrument controllers - a Höfner 500/1 "violin bass" controller, a Gretsch Duo Jet guitar controller, a Ludwig drum set and a microphone with its stand.

Two new guitar controllers were released alongside The Beatles: Rock Band, modeled after John Lennon's Rickenbacker 325 and George Harrison's Gretsch Duo Jet. Functionally, these controllers are equivalent to those released alongside Rock Band 2.

=== The Beatles: Rock Band bass guitar controller ===
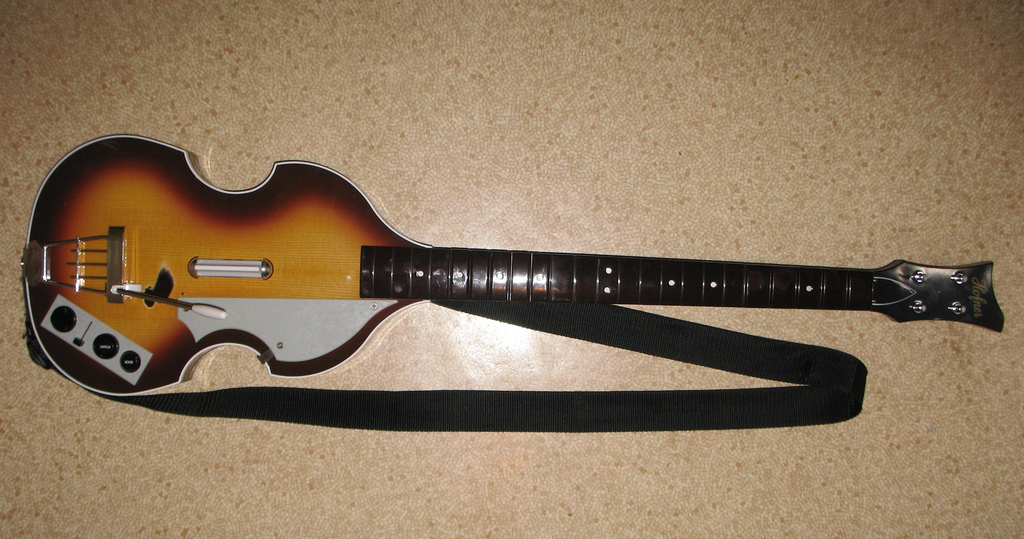
A Höfner 500/1 "violin bass" controller

The bass guitar controller released alongside The Beatles: Rock Band is modeled after the Höfner 500/1 "violin bass" guitar which was famously used by Sir Paul McCartney; however, it is configured for right-handed use, while McCartney's was left-handed, although one can use the "Lefty Flip" option to play left-handed. Unlike the bass guitar controller released alongside Rock Band 2, this controller is functionally equivalent to standard guitar controllers.

=== Compatibility ===
Although generally any guitar controller will work with a given rhythm game, this is not the case universally. The following table shows compatibility of various games with appropriate guitar controllers. (Rock Band 3 Pro guitar controllers are only compatible with Rock Band 3 and thus are not shown; likewise, Guitar Hero Live guitars are also not compatible with any other game and thus are not shown.)

	Guitar Hero	Guitar Hero II	Guitar Hero III	Guitar Hero: Aerosmith	Guitar Hero World Tour/Metallica	Guitar Hero 5/Van Halen	Guitar Hero: Warriors of Rock	Guitar Hero Smash Hits	Band Hero	Rock Band (+track packs and AC/DC Live)	Rock Band 2	Rock Band 3	Lego Rock Band	The Beatles: Rock Band	Green Day: Rock Band	Rock Revolution	PopStar Guitar (PS2 version only)
Rock Band guitar controllers (Rock Band/Rock Band 2 Stratocasters, The Beatles: Rock Band guitar/bass controllers and Mad Catz Telecaster/Precision Bass)	No	No	No	PS2 and Xbox 360 only	Yes	Yes	Yes	Yes	Yes	Yes	Yes	Yes	Yes	Yes	Yes	Yes	Yes/No^{†}
Guitar Hero: Warriors of Rock guitar controller	No	Yes	Yes	Yes	Yes	Yes	Yes	Yes	Yes	PS3 and Xbox 360 only	PS2 version not compatible	Yes	Yes	Yes	Yes	Yes	No
Guitar Hero 5/Band Hero Genericaster	?	Yes	Yes	Yes	Yes	Yes	Yes	Yes	Yes	PS3 and Xbox 360 only	PS2 version not compatible	Yes	Yes	Yes	Yes	Yes	Yes/No^{†}
Guitar Hero World Tour/Metallica Genericaster	?	Yes	Yes	Yes	Yes	Yes	Yes	Yes	Yes	PS3 and Xbox 360 only	PS2 version not compatible	Yes	Yes	Yes	Yes	Yes	Yes
Guitar Hero III/Aerosmith Les Paul (PS3, Wii, 360)	No	Xbox 360 only	Yes	Yes	Yes	Yes	Yes	Yes	Yes	PS3 and Xbox 360 only	Yes	Yes	Yes	Yes	Yes	Yes	No
Guitar Hero III Kramer (PS2)	Yes	Yes	Yes	Yes	Yes	Yes	No	Yes	Yes	Yes	Yes	No	No	No	No	No	Yes
X-Plorer (Xbox 360)	No	Yes	Yes	Yes	Yes	Yes	Yes	Yes	Yes	Yes	Yes	Yes	Yes	Yes	Yes	Yes	No
PlayStation 2 SG guitar controllers	Yes	Yes	Yes	Yes	Yes	Yes	No	Yes	Yes	Yes	Yes	No	No	No	No	No	Yes

^† Sources disagree about whether USB-based controllers are compatible with PopStar Guitar.

== Drum kits ==
Various controllers based around drum kits have been produced for the PlayStation 2, PlayStation 3, Wii and Xbox 360. The design of these varies depending on the game series a kit is designed for; Rock Band and Power Gig kits feature four drum pads, while Guitar Hero kits feature three drum pads and two cymbal pads. The Rock Band kits may be used in Guitar Hero games and vice versa, but due to the different number of pads the game experience may differ. When Rock Band kits are used in Guitar Hero games, the number of note tracks displayed on-screen is reduced to four due to the reduced number of pads.

=== Rock Band drum kit ===
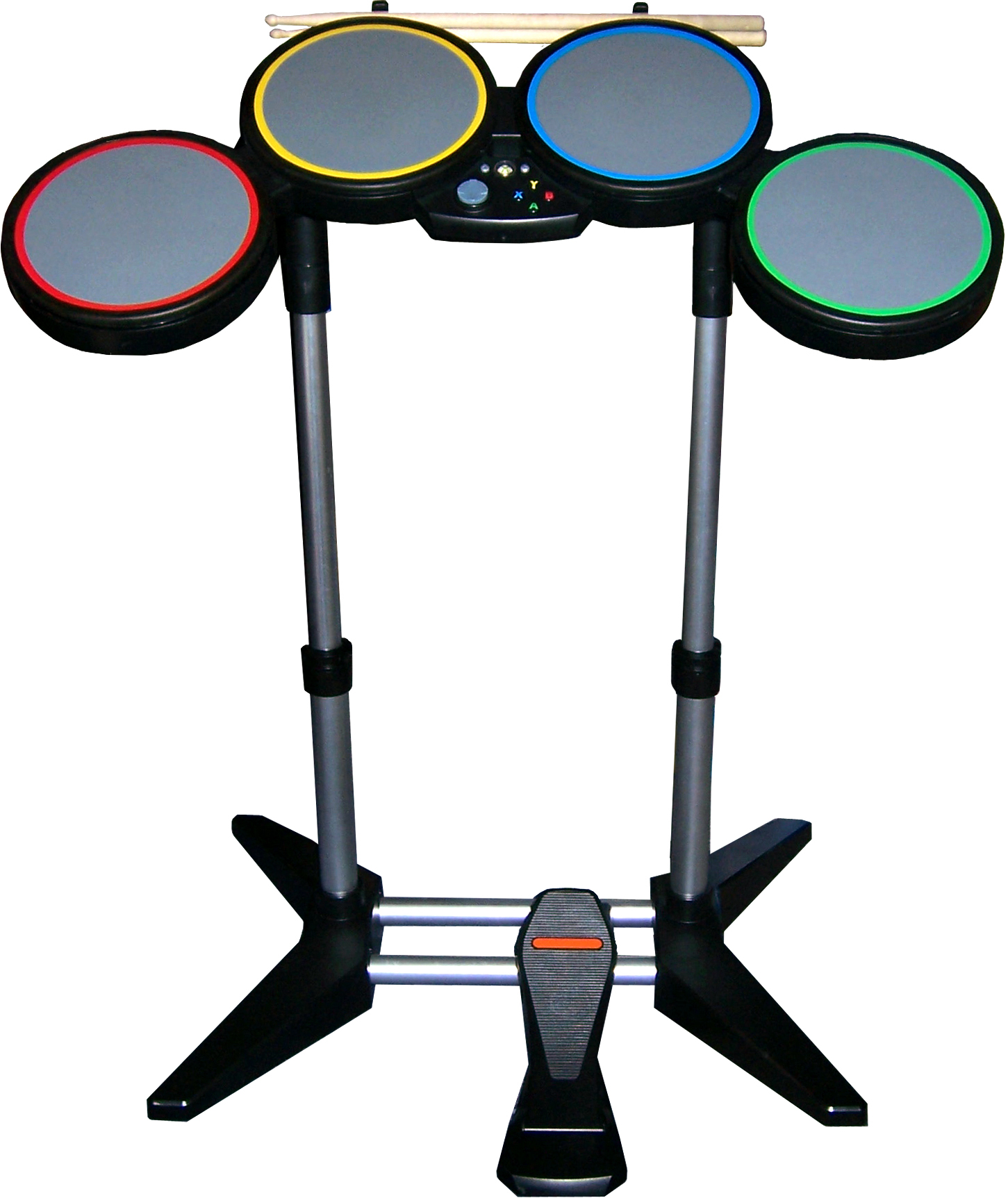
A Rock Band drum kit for the Xbox 360

The drum kit controller designed for use with Rock Band features four drum pads and a kick pedal, as well as a complement of standard buttons.^{[a]} Twin poles support the drum pads, which are adjustable for height to accommodate sitting or standing players. Drumsticks can be placed conveniently on notches at the back of the drum kit.

=== Rock Band 2 drum kit ===
The drum kit controller designed for use with Rock Band 2 follows the same basic design as the Rock Band kit, but with improved construction.

=== The Beatles: Rock Band drum kit ===
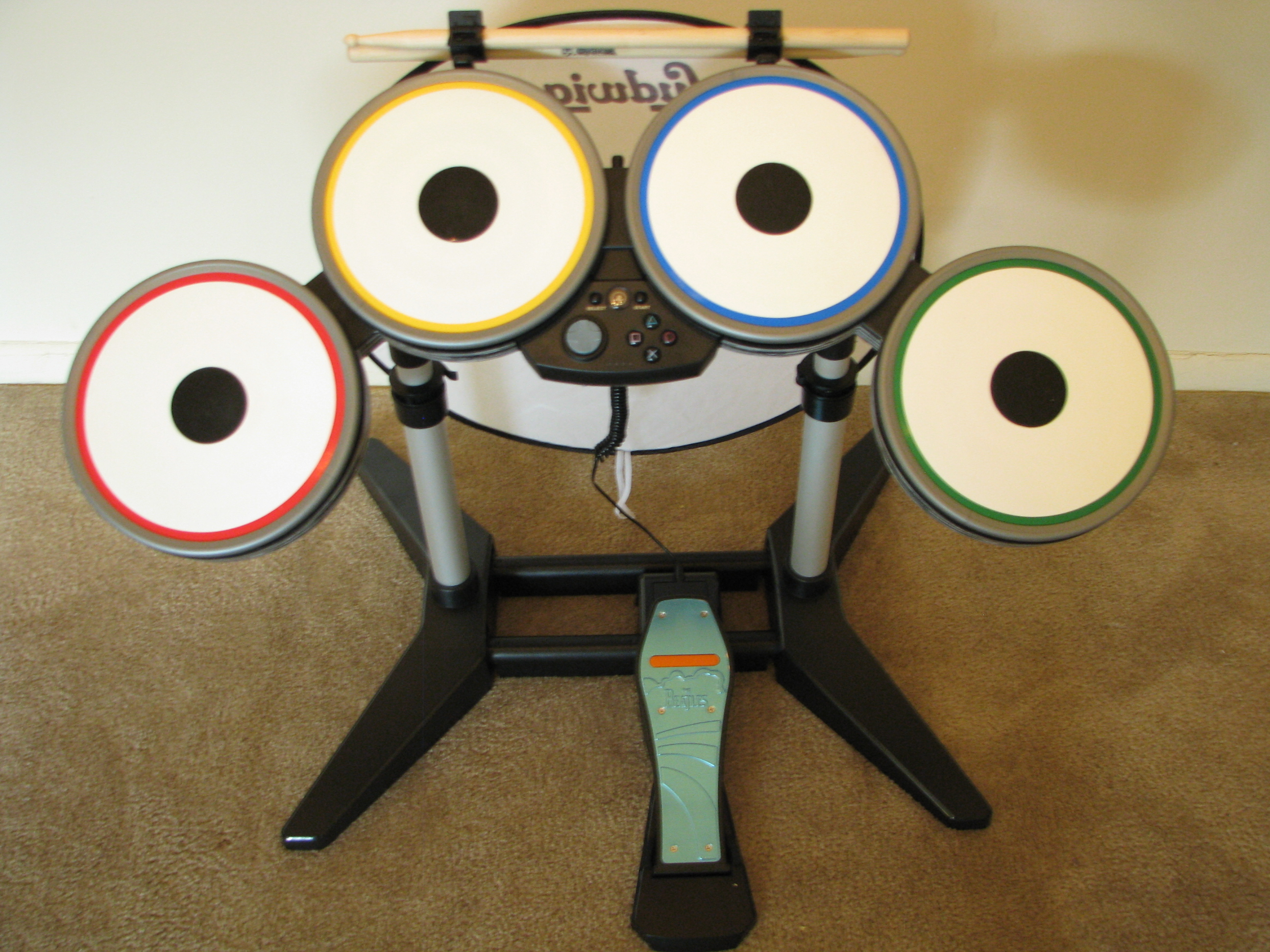
A The Beatles: Rock Band drum kit for the PlayStation 3

The Beatles: Rock Band drum is very similar to the kits released alongside Rock Band and Rock Band 2, but with a few minor color changes, the addition of Ludwig branding and a "The Beatles" bass drum attachment (which is only cosmetic). Functionally, it is identical to Rock Band 2 kits.

=== Mad Catz Rock Band portable drum kit ===
The Mad Catz Rock Band portable drum kit is a portable drum kit controller produced for use with Rock Band games by Mad Catz.

=== Logitech wireless drum controller ===
The Logitech wireless drum controller is a drum kit controller created for use with the Guitar Hero series of games. As such, it features three drum pads, two cymbal pads and a kick pedal.

=== Guitar Hero World Tour drum kit ===
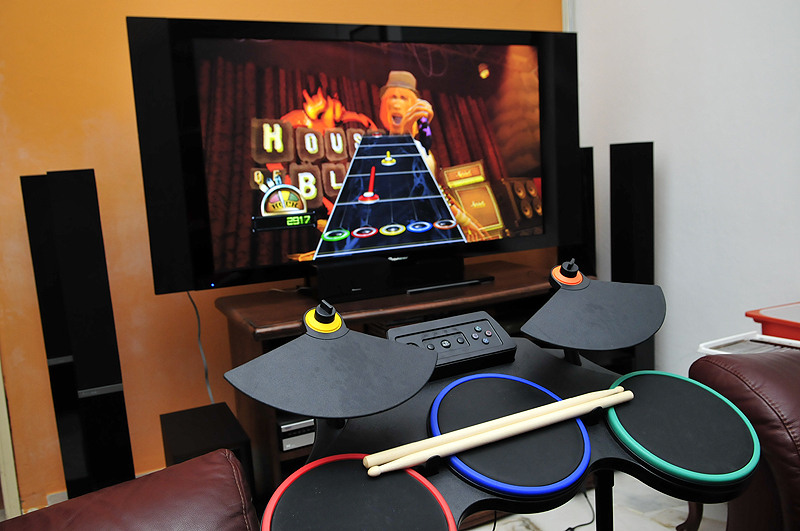
A Guitar Hero World Tour drum kit (and guitar gameplay)

The drum kit controller designed for Guitar Hero World Tour was the first such controller for a Guitar Hero game. It features three drum pads (red, blue and green) and two cymbal pads (yellow and orange), as well as a kick pedal, and a complement of standard buttons.^{[a]} The Guitar Hero World Tour kit also features a MIDI-in port, allowing users to connect most MIDI-compatible e-drum kits for use as game inputs. The MIDI port can also be used for calibration of the kit via a specialised USB → MIDI adapter and Windows-based calibration software. Like other Guitar Hero peripherals, the kit was produced by RedOctane.

=== Guitar Hero 5 drum kit ===
The drum kit controller designed for Guitar Hero 5 follows the same basic design as the Guitar Hero World Tour kit but with some modifications.

=== Power Gig: Rise of the SixString AirStrike drum kit ===
Unlike other drum controllers, the Power Gig: Rise of the SixString AirStrike drum kit does not feature discrete drum pads. Instead, it simulates drum hit via motion-tracking of the drum sticks. Like Rock Band kits, the Power Gig: Rise of the SixString AirStrike drum kit is set up for four drum pads.

^aThe standard buttons included on all drum controllers are:
- PlayStation 2/3: a PS/home button, d-pad, Start, Select and face buttons ( and)
- Wii: Wii controllers forgo these buttons; the Wii Remote's own buttons are used in their stead.
- Xbox 360: a Guide button, d-pad, Start, Back and face buttons ( and)

== Rock Band 3 "Pro" controllers ==
Rock Band 3 saw the addition of a new "Pro mode", which more closely mimics playing real musical instruments. As such, new peripherals were produced available to allow players to access these modes.

=== MIDI Pro-adapter ===
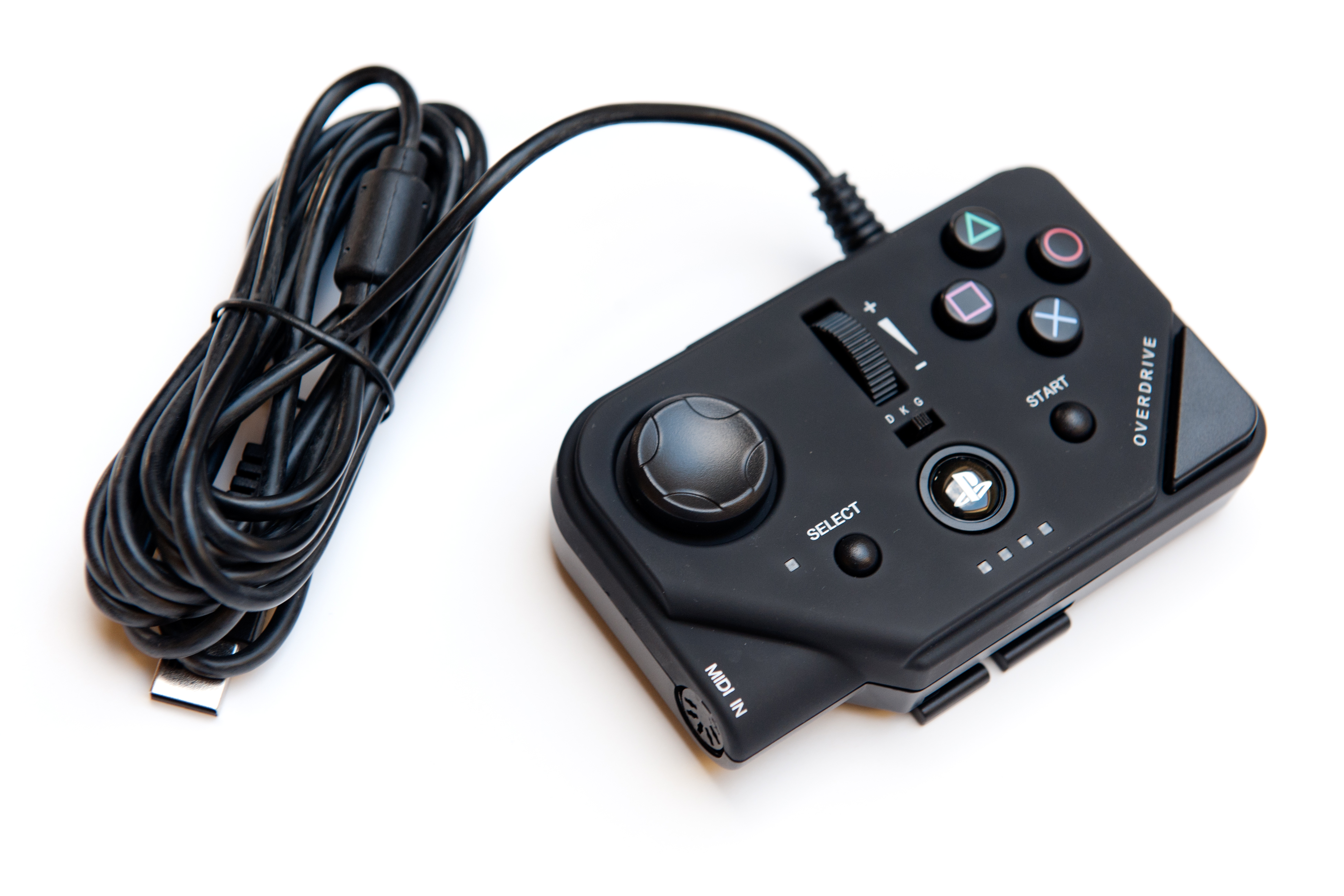
PlayStation 3 version of the Rock Band 3 MIDI Pro-Adapter

Designed by Harmonix and manufactured by Mad Catz, the MIDI Pro-Adapter allows users to connect most^{†} MIDI-compatible drum-kits and keyboards for use in Rock Band 3, as well as some specialized guitars (such as the official Rock Band 3 Squier Stratocaster Pro controller and the You Rock MIDI guitar^{‡}); standard MIDI guitars are not compatible however. The adapter features a small switch to change between drums, keyboard and guitar modes, a volume wheel and an overdrive button. A standard complement of face buttons, Start/+, Select/Back/- and Home/Guide buttons and a d-pad are also present for navigation. The adapter connects to the console via a 9.8 ft (3 m) USB cable and to the instrument via a standard MIDI connector (5-pin DIN).

^† The MIDI Pro-Adapter responds to specific MIDI note data, so instruments that do not output these notes and cannot be re-mapped are not compatible.
^‡ Requires firmware update on the You Rock guitar for compatibility.

=== Wireless Pro keyboard ===
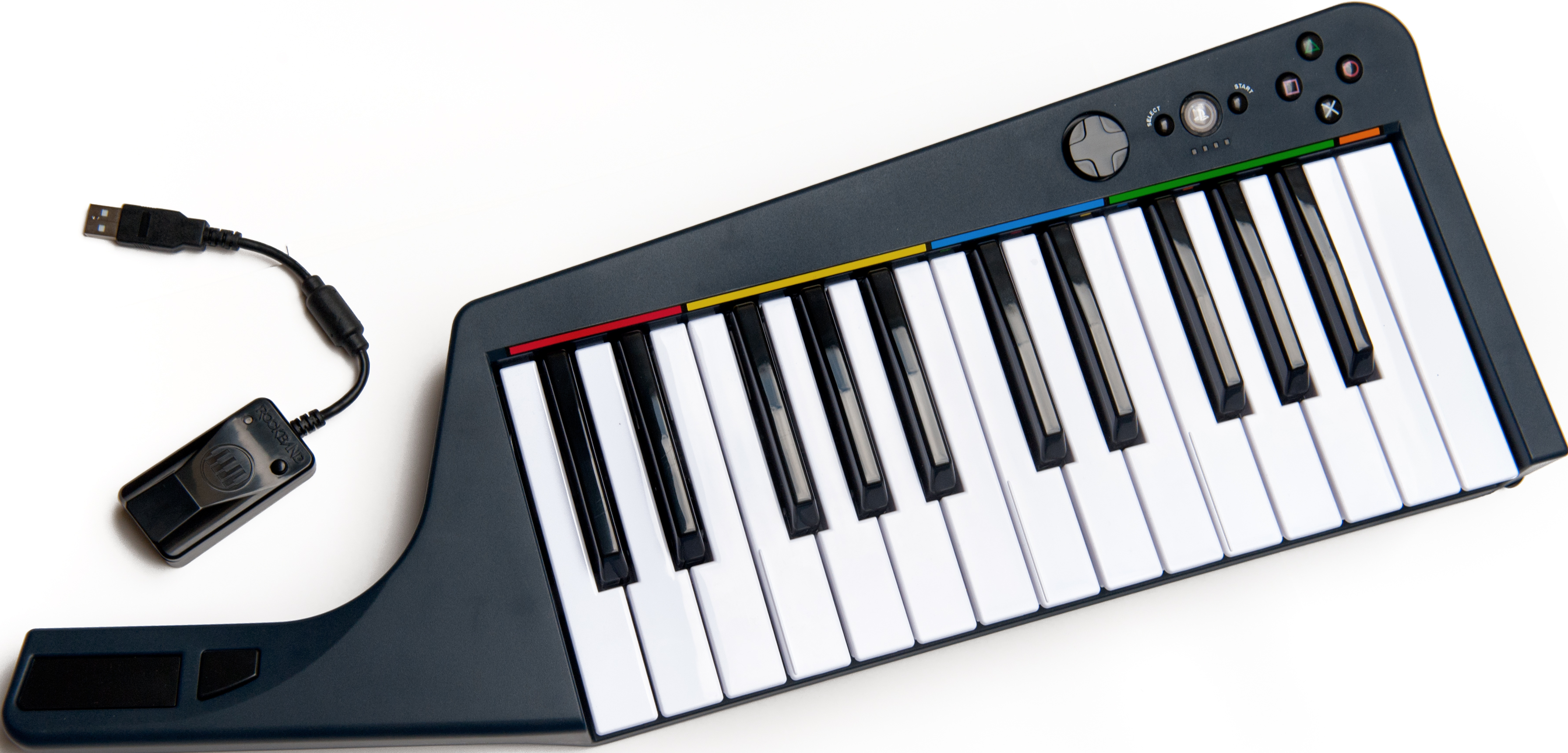
Rock Band 3 Wireless Pro Keyboard for PlayStation 3

In order to play the new keyboard-based instrument parts (keyboard, piano, organ etc.) in Rock Band 3, Harmonix designed a keyboard controller, which is produced by Mad Catz. The controller has a handle or "neck" on one side, and so resembles a keytar; this allows it to be either worn over the shoulder using a strap (like a keytar) or placed on a horizontal surface (like a traditional keyboard). The keyboard features 25 full-sized velocity-sensitive keys, with an overdrive button and a touch-sensitive strip on the "neck". It also features a standard set of buttons,^{[a]} in order to facilitate navigation within the game and on the console itself.

For standard keyboard mode and when playing guitar/bass parts, five white keys, from the middle C to G, are marked with colored dots, and are played similarly to the fret buttons found on guitar controllers. For pro mode, all the keys are used, and the keyboard is split up into 5 colored sections to aid the player: red - C_{3}-E_{3}, yellow - F_{3}-B_{4}, blue - C_{4} (middle C)-E_{4}, green - F_{4}-B_{5} and orange - C_{5}. The touchpad acts as a modulation control, and in game-play terms is functionally equivalent to the whammy bar on standard guitar controllers.

The keyboard controller also has a 3.5 mm TRS connector (jack) which can be used to attach either a stomp switch or an analog expression pedal.

The controller connects to the console wirelessly via a USB dongle. In order to facilitate syncing between the dongle and the controller, each has a sync button. The dongle also features a 2-port USB hub, allowing additional peripherals to be connected to the system. Unlike guitar and drum controllers, the Wii version does not connect via the Wii remote, and instead connects via a USB dongle.

^a These buttons are:
- a Home/PS-button, d-pad, and standard PlayStation Start, Select and face buttons ( and) on the PlayStation 3
- a Guide button, d-pad, Start, Back and face buttons ( and) on the Xbox 360
- a Home button, d-pad, +, -, A, B, 1 and 2 buttons on the Wii.

==== Use as a MIDI controller ====
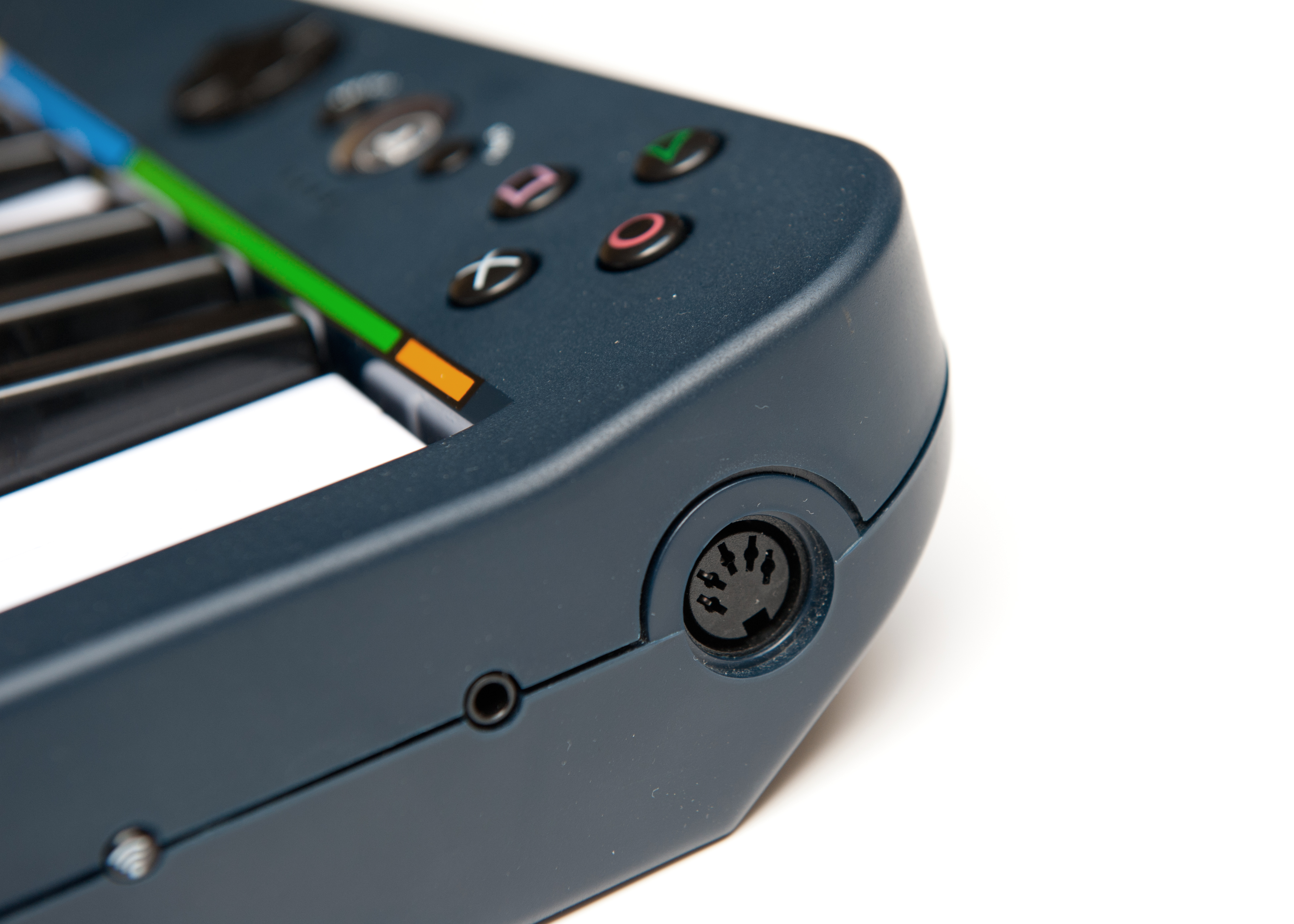
The MIDI port on the Wireless Pro keyboard. Also visible to the left are the 3.5 mm pedal connector and the sync button.

The keyboard controller is also MIDI compatible via a standard MIDI port (5-pin DIN connector) on its side. As such it can be connected to most synthesizers (via a MIDI cable) and computers (via a MIDI-to-USB adapter), allowing the controller to be used as a real musical instrument. The controller transmits keyboard notes on MIDI channel 1.

When in MIDI mode, the various non-keyboard controls (with the exception of the sync button) are re-mapped to MIDI commands. The touch-strip acts as a modulation wheel or, when the overdrive button is held, as a pitch wheel. The //1 button decrements the octave (i.e. shifts it down so, for example, the C_{3} key becomes C_{2}), while the / button increments it (shifts it up); these can be used multiple times to get to various different octave settings from -1 (MIDI notes 0–11, or C_{−1}-B_{0}) to 7 (notes 96–107, or C_{7}-B_{8}). This applies to the "base" octave (red and yellow keys); the other keys also shift in relation to this, making the highest possible note C_{9}. The //2 and / buttons increment or decrement the program number (respectively), while the Start/+, Home/Guide and Select/Back/- send real-time system stop, continue and start messages (respectively). Up on the d-pad toggles the keyboard between standard and drum mapping mode, which maps the lower octave (red and yellow keys) to MIDI drum notes (transmitted on channel 10). The remaining d-pad buttons/directions allow switching of analog pedal functions; down sets it as a channel volume controller, left as an expression pedal (default) and right sets it as a foot controller.

=== Pro cymbals ===
In order to play the "pro" drum mode, players require at least four drum pads and at least 1 cymbal pad (with up to three cymbals being compatible). To allow this, pro cymbals were released to complement existing Rock Band 2 drum sets.

=== Pro guitar controllers ===
For the pro guitar mode of Rock Band 3, a pro guitar controller is required. Unlike standard guitar controllers, pro guitars allow input of any fret/string combination, allowing accurate simulation of a real guitar.

==== Fender Mustang Pro Guitar controller ====
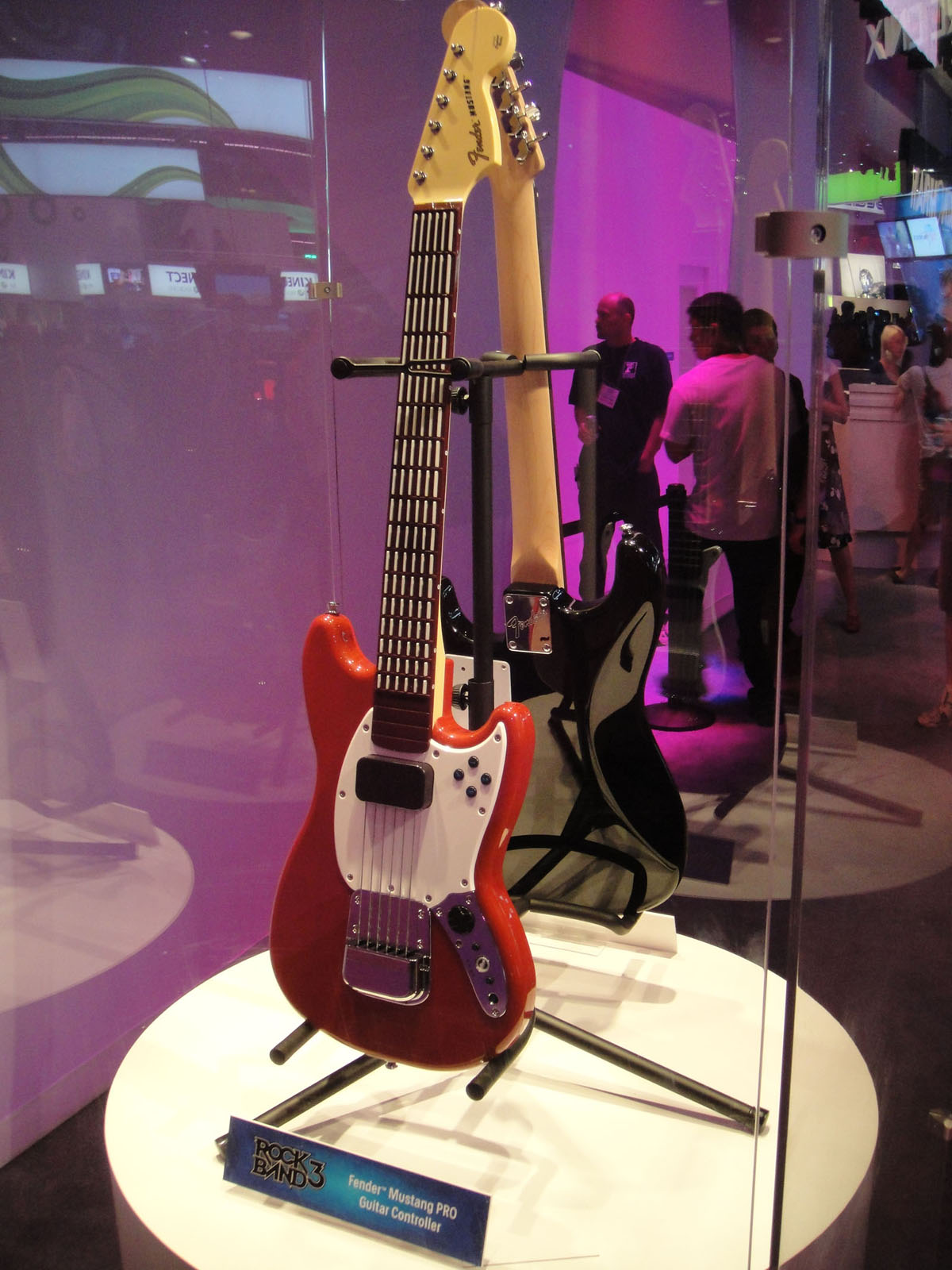
Fender Mustang pro controller

The Fender Mustang Pro Guitar controller, which is based on the Fender Mustang, has 102 buttons along its neck which simulate holding the guitar strings against the fretboard. All six strings are represented along 17 different frets. In order to simulate picking/strumming, the Mustang pro controller features a "string box" located on the body of the controller (around the position of the strum bar on standard guitar controllers, or the cavity/pickups on a real guitar). It consists of six short stainless-steel strings suspended between two sensors, which detect the vibration of the stings when plucked or strummed. In addition to pro mode use, the Mustang can be used to play the game in basic mode. It also functions as a full MIDI guitar, with a MIDI output connector providing compatibility with MIDI software sequencers and hardware devices. For use in gaming mode, each Mustang controller can only be used with the game console it was designed for. An unofficial workaround involves connecting it through a MIDI-Pro Adapter, although direction pad buttons, overdrive detection and Basic 5-button game play are unavailable since they do not function through the MIDI port. The Mustang Pro-Guitar is only a few inches smaller in length than an actual guitar, but, being made of plastic, is much lighter than an actual guitar. The neck is removable from the body for easier storage and transport.

==== Fender Squier Stratocaster Pro Guitar ====
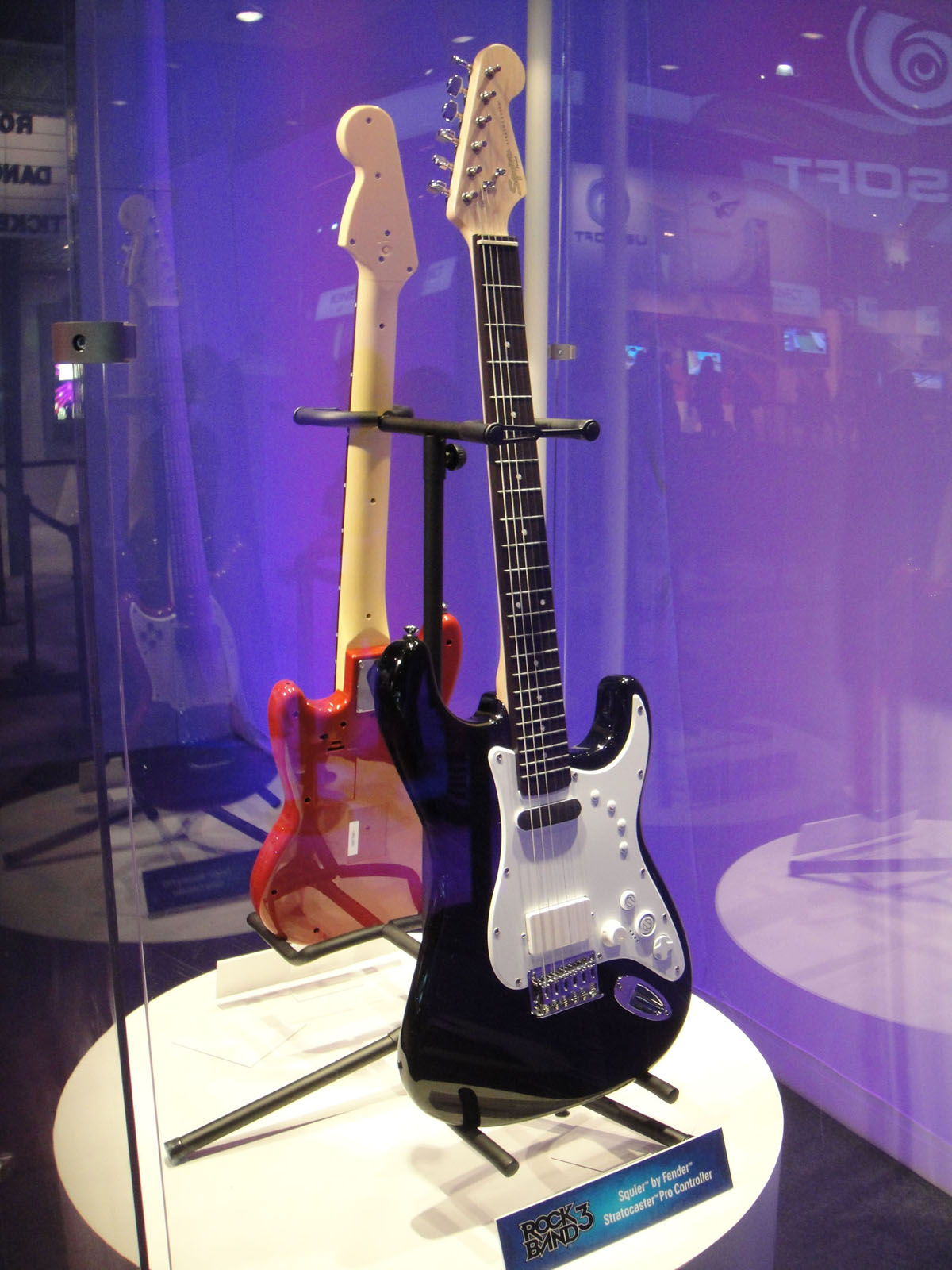
Squier Stratocaster pro controller for Rock Band 3

The Fender Squier Stratocaster Pro Guitar is a specifically designed 6-string Squier Stratocaster guitar which is compatible with Rock Band 3 pro mode. This is a true six-string electric guitar, with electronics built in to allow it to interface with the game to provide added features such as on-screen fret sensing. Additionally, the Squier Stratocaster Pro Guitar has full MIDI output capabilities.

Unlike the Mustang Pro controller, the Squier is "console-neutral", as it is connected to the console via the MadCatz MIDI Pro-Adapter. The Squier, being a real guitar, has no buttons for gameplay and therefore is not usable for basic game play mode, only pro mode.

A demonstration of the Fender Squier Stratocaster Pro Guitar at its Electronic Entertainment Expo debut showed it being played directly through an electric amplifier alongside other players on the other controllers while playing the game.

== TurnTables ==
=== BeatMania Turntables ===
After the success of the release of PaRappa the Rapper, Konami released the game Beatmania with a DJ style controller. The game was originally an arcade game but later released on home consoles.

=== DJ Hero turntables ===
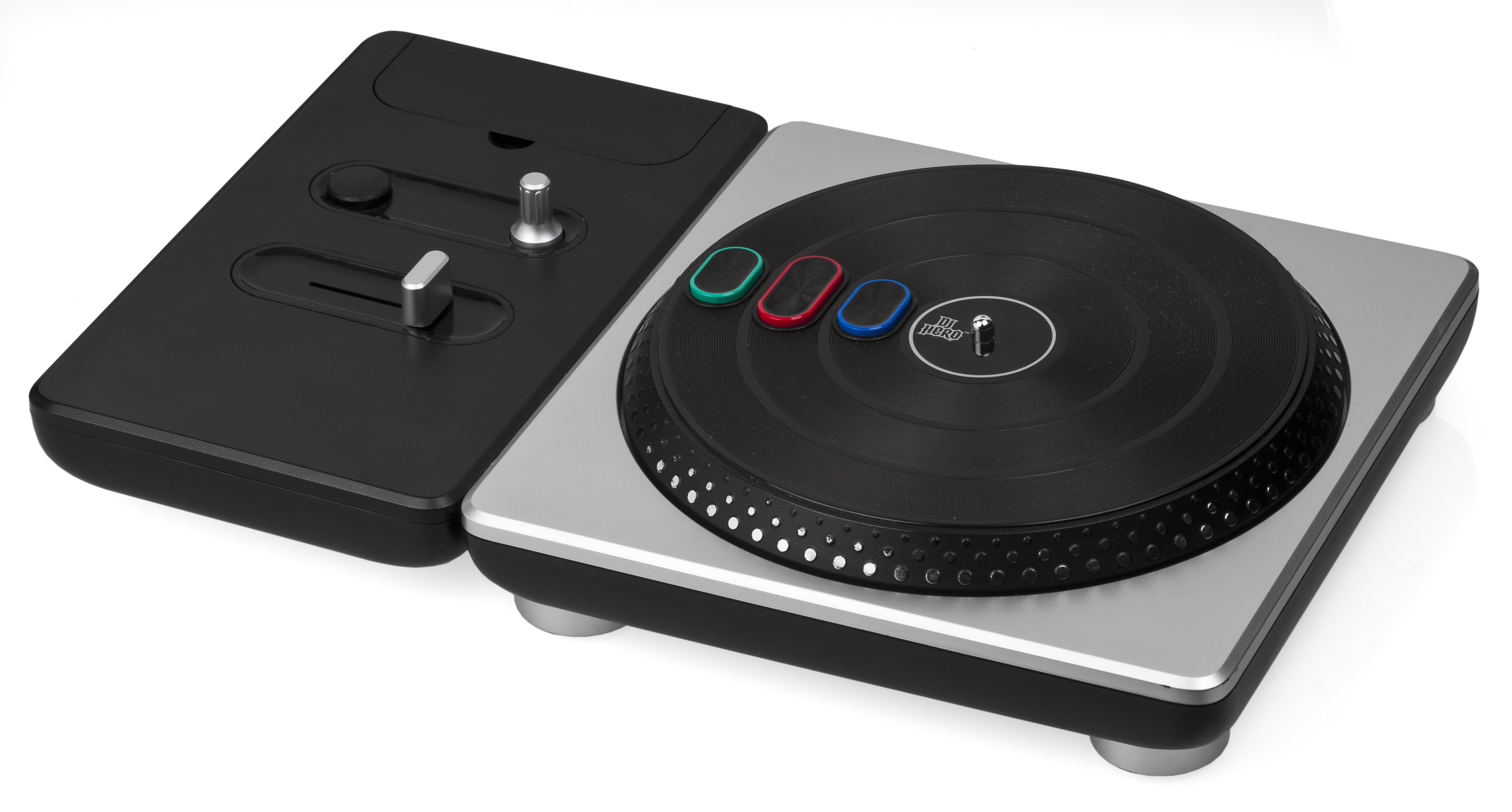
DJ Hero turntable controller for Xbox 360

In 2009, the DJ Hero turntable was introduced. It consists of a record platter that is actually smaller than LPs. It also has 3 buttons, green, red and blue. The red button is big while the green and blue are small. Then, on the left side, was the crossfader, which allows player to swipe through. The effects dial that when players dial for extra points. Then, the Euphoria button, which activates to gain more points. Lastly, the flap with standard buttons, which can be used to navigate the home menu/dashboard.

== Microphones ==
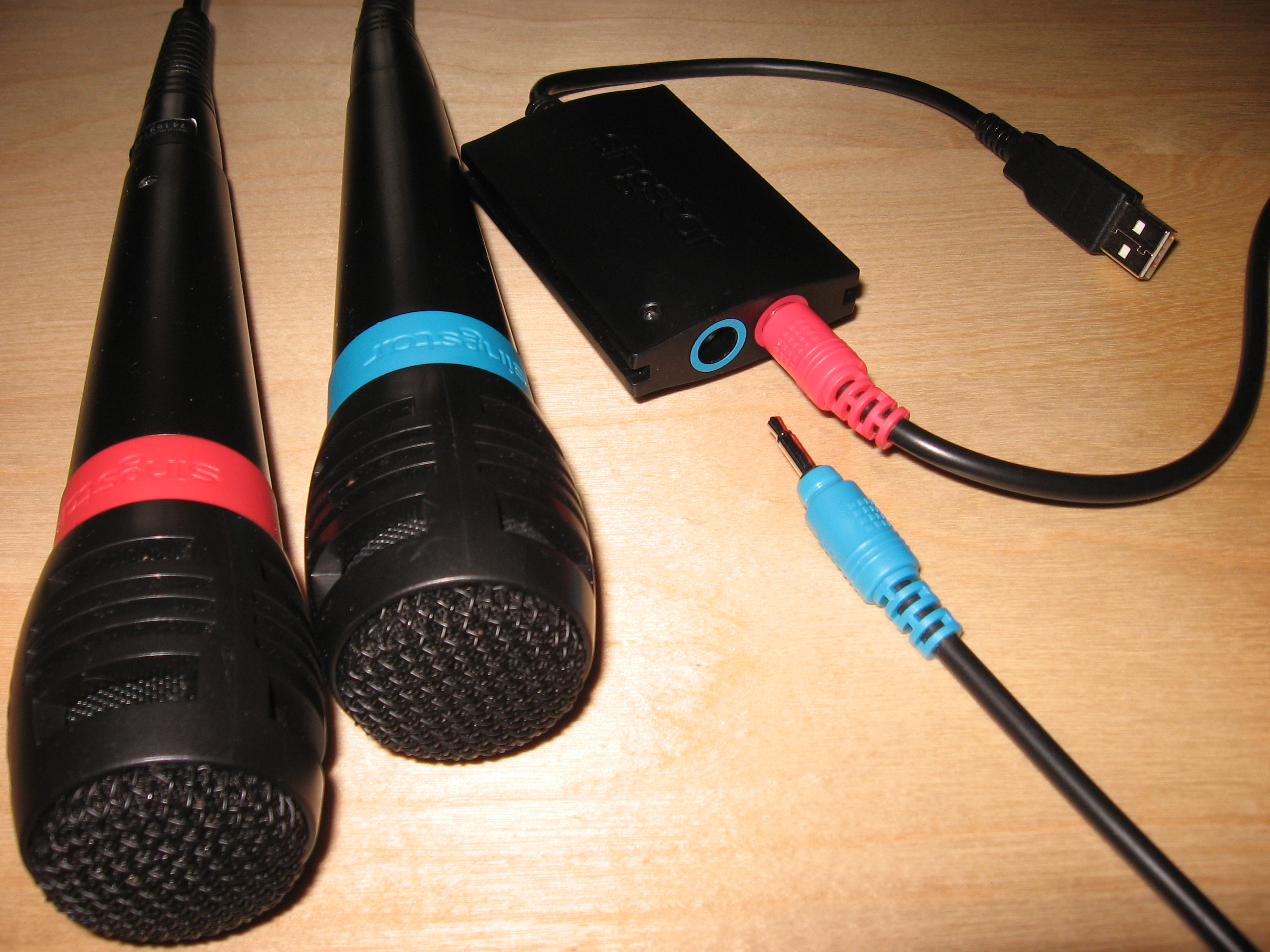
Two wired SingStar microphones with USB adapter

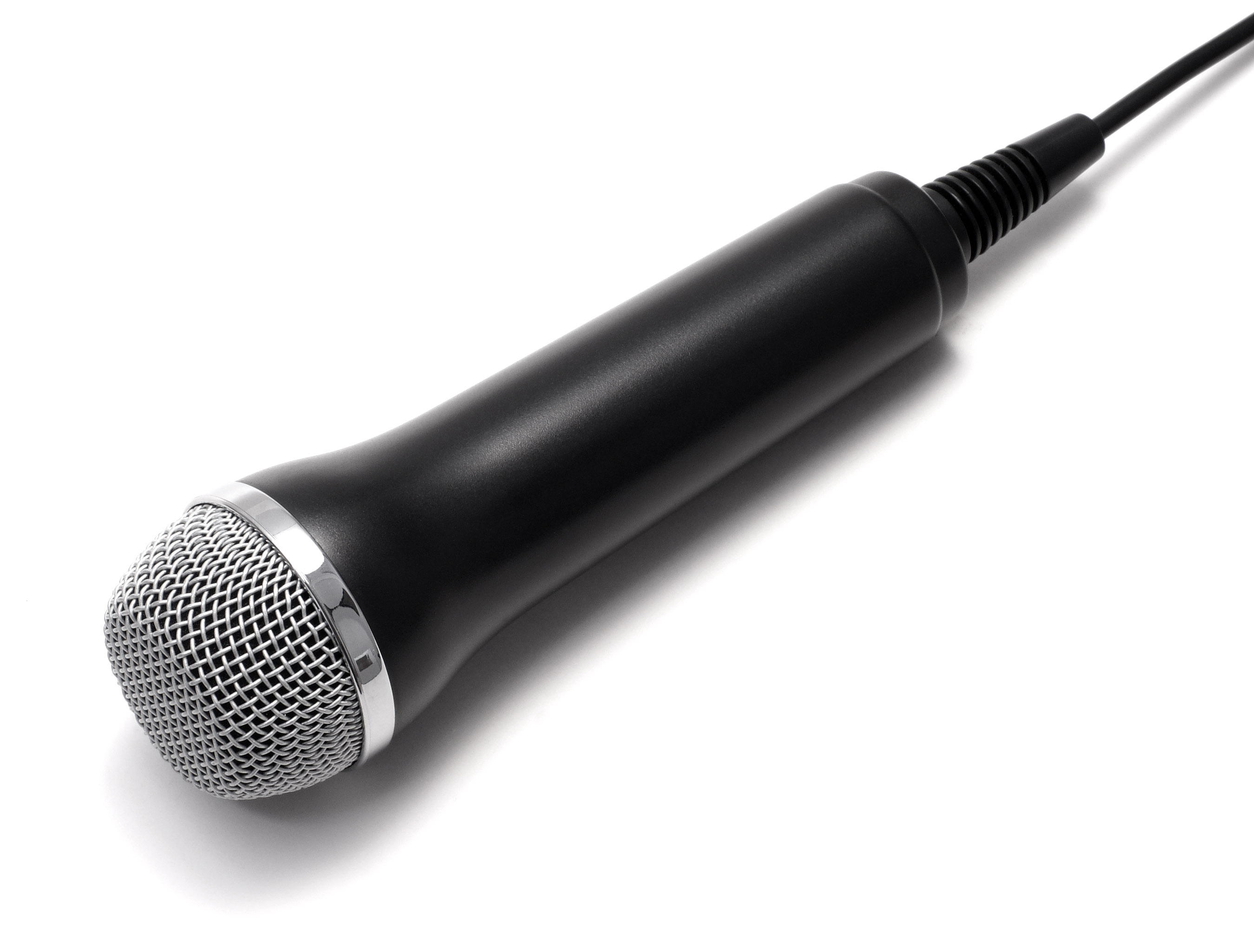
USB microphone included with Rock Band games

The Rock Band and Guitar Hero games are compatible with all standard USB and Bluetooth microphones (Bluetooth microphones are limited to the PlayStation 3). This includes all the PS2 SingStar microphones, PS3 SingStar wireless and wired microphones and microphones included with Guitar Hero and Rock Band games.

Microsoft has also released an official wireless microphone for the Xbox 360 which works via its 2.4 GHz wireless technology. It may be used with some Rock Band, Guitar Hero and DJ Hero games, as well as with Lips games, Def Jam Rapstar and Michael Jackson: The Experience.

For Singstar games on the PlayStation 2 and 3, Sony have released both wired and wireless microphones. The wired microphones are standard microphones with a 3.5 mm TRS connector, which connect to the systems via a USB adapter. Each adapter can be used to connect two microphones to a single USB port.

== osu! ==
osu! requires a keyboard and a mouse, at least. A tablet or a digital Taiko drum is supported. They also provide support for the Wii Remote, which acts as a nowaday VR controller

=== Wii Remote ===
The Wii Remote could be connected either via Bluetooth or cable.

== Other ==
=== DK Bongos ===
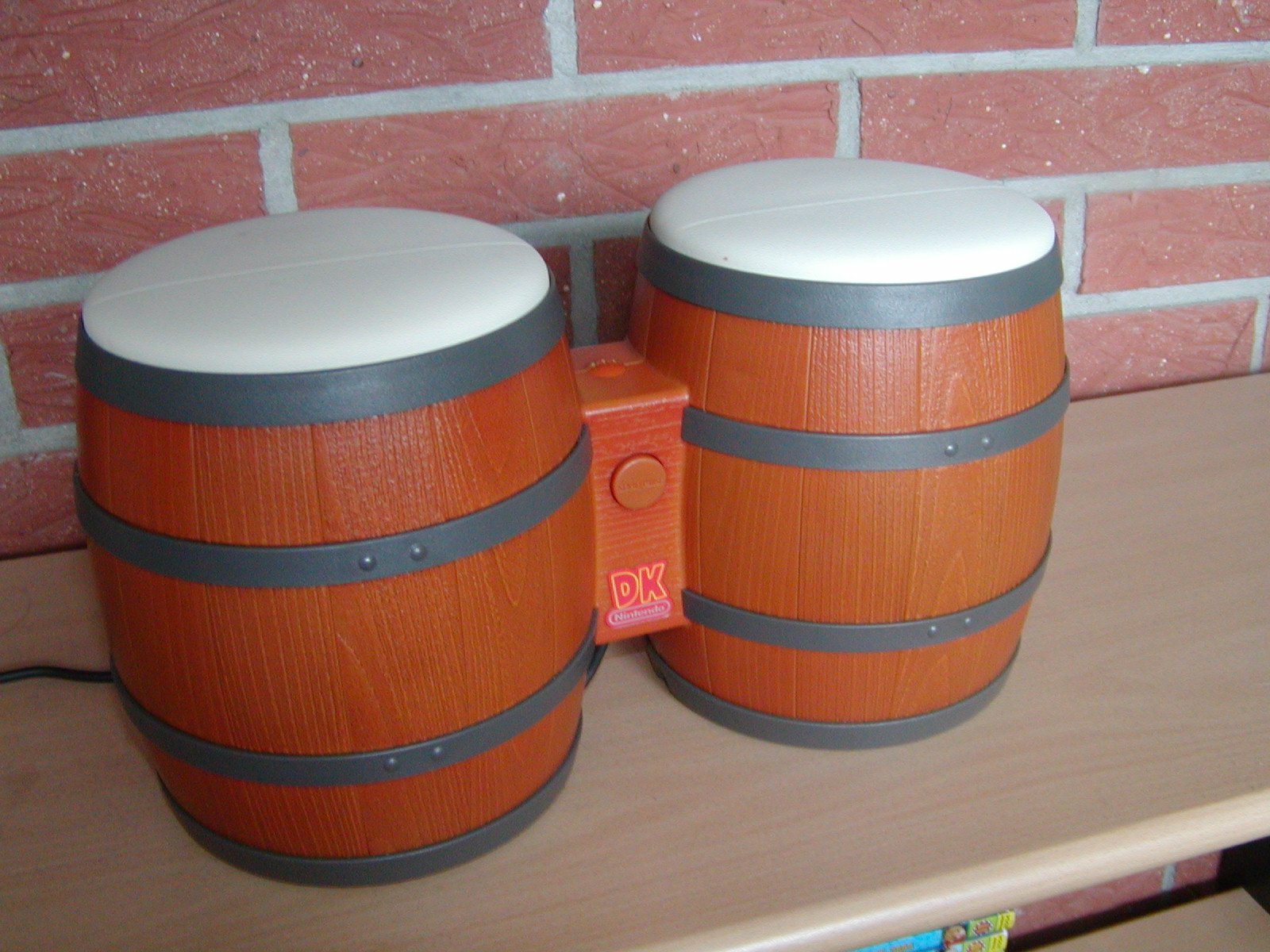
DK Bongos

DK Bongos are a unique controller for the GameCube designed for the Donkey Konga series of rhythm games. The controller is based around two barrel-shaped bongo drums, each of which can detect when it is hit. It also features a microphone for clap detection.

=== Pop'n Music Controller ===
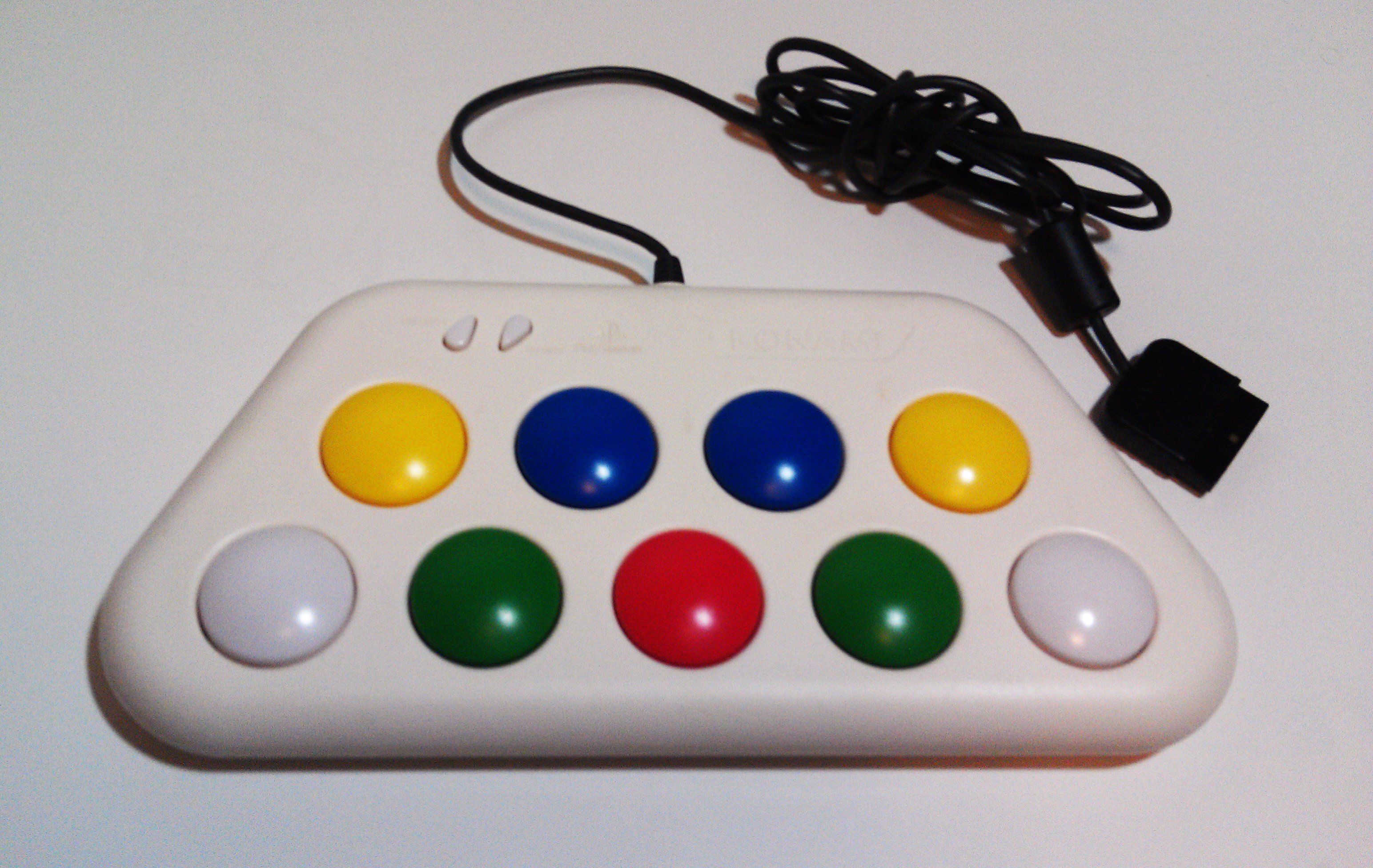
Official controller

The game Pop'n Music from Konami released with its own controller featuring brightly colored buttons reminiscent of an arcade cabinet input.

=== Taiko no Tatsujin ===
Taiko no Tatsujin or 'Master of Drums' is a popular drumming game series from Japan that has featured many home releases that included drum controllers. These drums are meant to emulate a Taiko Drum

=== Samba de Amigo ===
Samba de Amigo for the Sega Dreamcast included a set of maracas controllers.

=== Shakatto Tambourine! ===
Shakatto Tambourine! released for the Sega Dreamcast came with a tambourine controller

=== Mad Maestro! ===
The Japanese release of the game Mad Maestro! featured a baton controller

== See also ==
- RedOctane
- Mad Catz
