= The Near Future (album) =

2014 album by I Fight Dragons

Studio album by I Fight Dragons
- Released: December 9, 2014
- Genre: Electronic rock, chiptune, power pop
- Label: Self-released

I Fight Dragons chronology
DEMOlition - 12 Demos That Didn't Make KABOOM! (2010)	The Near Future (2014)	The Future Imperfect (2014)

The Near Future is the second album by I Fight Dragons, released on December 9, 2014, the album was originally planned for a September 16, 2014 release date but for unknown reasons was pushed back. It includes a ten-track concept storytelling arc of songs with five additional tracks.

The album was funded by a successful Kickstarter campaign known as Project Atma. It reached No. 32 on the Billboard Top Rock Albums chart and No. 5 on the Billboard Vinyl Albums chart upon its release.

== Track listing ==
No.	Title	Length
1.	"The Near Future I. Prelude"	0:28
2.	"The Near Future II. Eighteen"	3:18
3.	"The Near Future III. Battle"	3:19
4.	"The Near Future IV. Another Week"	3:22
5.	"The Near Future V. Meeting"	1:03
6.	"The Near Future VI. Rescue"	1:17
7.	"The Near Future VII. Time to Fly"	3:19
8.	"The Near Future VIII. Requiem"	1:01
9.	"The Near Future IX. Return"	0:32
10.	"The Near Future X. Fighting On"	4:35
11.	"No Strings"	3:05
12.	"Pretend"	3:22
13.	"Chicago"	3:42
14.	"Always"	2:29
15.	"Jimmy and Sally"	6:46

== Personnel ==
- Brian Mazzaferri - lead vocals, acoustic guitar, chiptune
- Packy Lundholm - vocals, electric guitar
- Hari Rao - bass
- Chad Van Dahm - drums
