= Bowling for Soup discography =

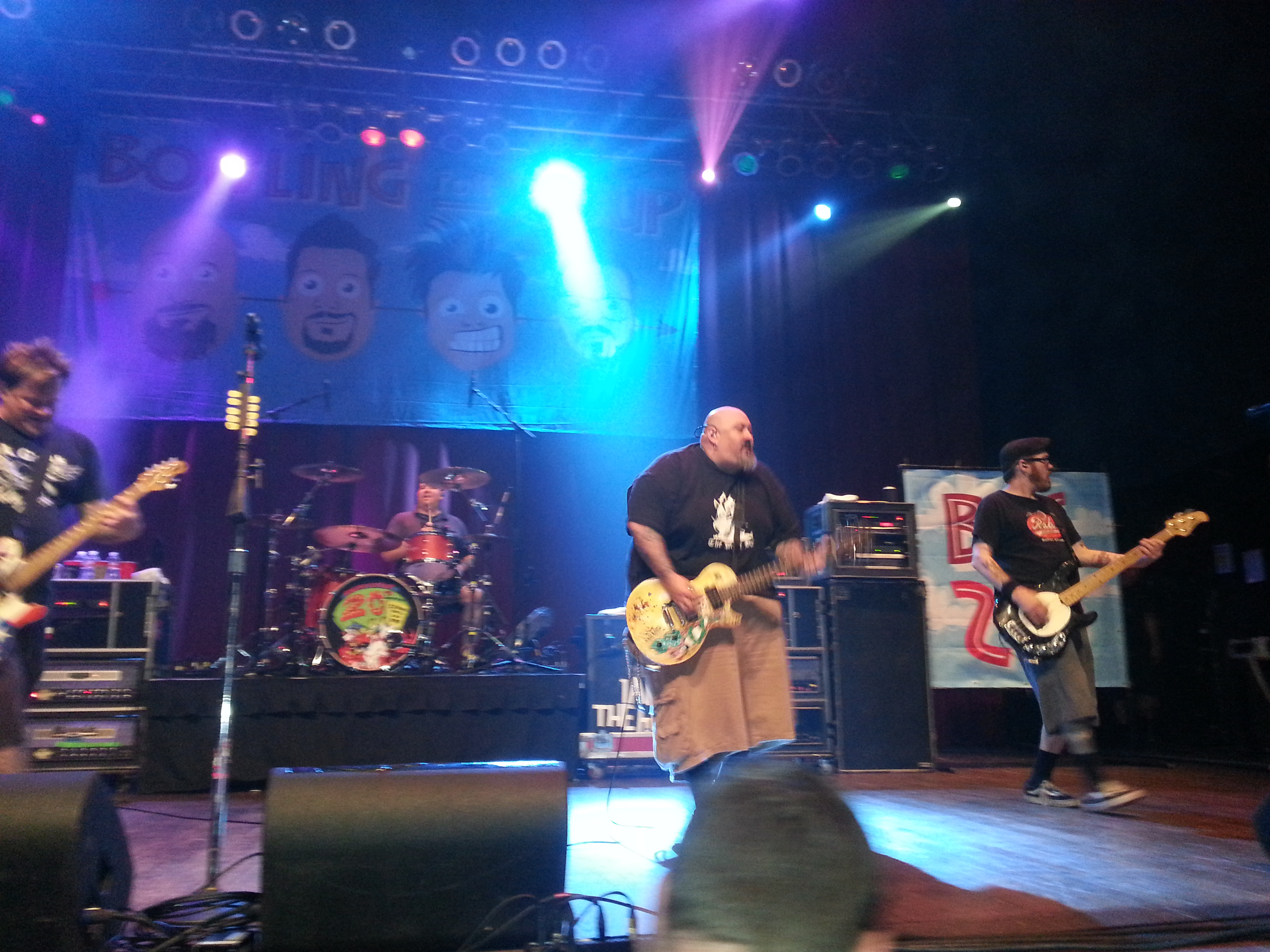
- Bowling for Soup performing in 2013
- Studio albums: 11
- Extended plays: 4
- Live albums: 3
- Compilation albums: 10
- Singles: 25
- Video albums: 3
- Music videos: 36

The discography of Bowling for Soup, an American rock band based in Wichita Falls, Texas, consists of eleven studio albums, four live albums/live DVDs, ten compilation albums, four extended plays, twenty-five singles, and thirty-six music videos.

A Hangover You Don't Deserve was the most successful album for the band, earning a Gold certification from the Recording Industry Association of America.

== Albums ==
=== Studio albums ===
Year	Album details	Peak chart positions			Certifications (sales thresholds)
Year	Album details	US	IRL	UK	Certifications (sales thresholds)
1994	Bowling for Soup: Released: September 1994; Label: Que-so; Format: CS, CD, DL	—	—	—	
1998	Rock on Honorable Ones!!: Released: January 1998; Label: FFROE; Formats: CD, DL	—	—	—	
2000	Let's Do It for Johnny!!: Released: May 16, 2000; Label: Jive/Silvertone/FFROE; Formats: CD, DL, LP	—	—	186	
2002	Drunk Enough to Dance: Released: August 6, 2002; Label: FFROE/Silvertone/Jive; Formats: CD, DL	129	25	14	BPI: Silver
2004	A Hangover You Don't Deserve: Released: September 14, 2004; Label: FFROE/Jive/Zomba; Formats: CD, CD+DVD, DL	37	—	64	RIAA: Gold; BPI: Silver
2006	The Great Burrito Extortion Case: Released: November 7, 2006; Label: Jive/Zomba; Formats: CD, DL	88	—	43	
2009	Sorry for Partyin': Release: October 13, 2009; Label: Jive; Formats: CD, DL	104	—	84	
2011	Fishin' for Woos: Release: April 25, 2011; Label: Que-so/Brando; Formats: CD, DL, LP	189	—	66	
2013	Lunch. Drunk. Love.: Release: September 10, 2013; Label: Que-so/Brando; Formats: CD, DL, LP	142	—	100	
2016	Drunk Dynasty: Release: October 14, 2016; Label: Que-so/Brando; Formats: CD, DL	—	—	—	
2022	Pop Drunk Snot Bread: Release: April 22, 2022; Label: Que-so/Brando; Formats: CD, DL, LP	—	—	—	
"—" denotes a release that did not chart.

=== Split albums ===
Year	Album details
1996	Cell Mates: Split with: The V.I.M.S; Released: February 1996; Label: Que-so; Formats: CD, DL
2012	Bowling for Soup Presents: One Big Happy!: Split with The Dollyrots and Patent Pending; Released: September 24, 2012; Label: Que-so/Brando; Formats: CD, DL

=== Live albums ===
Year	Album details
2008	Bowling for Soup: Live and Very Attractive: Released: September 2, 2008; Label: Jive/Zomba; Format: DVD, CD, DL
2016	Acoustic in a Freakin' English Church!: Released: December 16, 2016; Label: Que-so/Brando; Format: DVD, CD, DL
2018	Live from Brixton: Older, Fatter, Still the Greatest Ever!: Released: January 18, 2019; Label: Que-so/Brando; Format: DVD, CD, DL
2025	Stoked on Trent (Live Acoustic, 2022): Released: February 21, 2025; Label: Que-so/Brando; Format: DL
2025	A Hangover You Definitely Deserve (Live): Released: October 24, 2025; Label: Que-so/Brando; Format: Vinyl, CD, DL

=== Compilation albums ===
Year	Album details
2005	Bowling for Soup Goes to the Movies: Released: November 15, 2005; Label: FFROE/Jive/Zomba; Formats: CD, DL
2010	Jaret & Erik 2010 UK Acoustic Tour Limited Edition CD: Released: April 2010; Formats: CD
2011	Playlist: The Very Best of Bowling for Soup: Released: January 25, 2011; Label: Legacy; Formats: CD, DL
2011	Merry Flippin' Christmas Volumes 1 and 2: Released: November 8, 2011; Label: Brando; Formats: DL
2013	The Pledge Music Acoustic Album That Almost Never Was: Released: 2013; Formats: DL
2014	Drunk Enough for Demos!: Released: 2014; Label: Que-so/Brando; Formats: CD
2015	Songs People Actually Liked – Volume 1 – The First 10 Years (1994–2003): Released: November 19, 2014 (To PledgeMusic pledges); Formats: CD, DL
2019	A Nice Night for an Evening: Released: December 20, 2019; Label: Que-so/Brando; Formats: DL
2023	Don't Mind If We Do: Released: April 4, 2023; Label: Que-so/Brando; Formats: DL
2023	Songs People Actually Liked – Volume 2 – The Next 6 Years (2004-2009): Releasing: August 25, 2023; Formats: CD, DL, LP
2026	Good Enough For The Girls I Go Out With! (Demos & Placeholders): Released: July 24, 2026; Label: TPRM OD’s; Formats: CD, vinyl, DL

== Extended plays ==
Year	EP details
1998	Tell Me When to Whoa!: Released: 1998; Label: FFROE; Formats: CD, DL
2004	Acoustic EP: Released: October 19, 2004; Label: Zomba, Rolling Stone; Formats: DL
2005	On Your Mark, Get Set...Smoke a Cigarette: Released: January 25, 2005; Label: Jive; Formats: DL
2009	My Wena: Released: August 7, 2009; Label: RCA/Jive; Formats: DL
2009	Merry Flippin' Christmas: Volume 1: Released: November 26, 2009; Label: Crappy/Brando; Formats: CD, DL
2010	Merry Flippin' Christmas: Volume 2: Released: 2010; Label: Brando; Formats: 7" Vinyl
2011	The Dollyrots vs. Bowling for Soup: Released: August 5, 2011; Label: Que-so/Brando; Formats: 7" Vinyl (Limited Edition), DL; Split with: The Dollyrots
2011	Fishin' for Woos Bonus Tracks!: Released: 2011; Label: Que-so/Brando; Formats: 7" Vinyl
2024	Bait and Switch: Vol. 1: Released: February 2024; Label: SBAM; Formats: 7", DL; Split with: Less Than Jake

== Singles ==
Year	Single	Peak chart positions										Certifications (sales threshold)	Album
Year	Single	US	US Adult	US Pop	AUS	CAN	IRL	NLD	SCO	UK	UK Rock	Certifications (sales threshold)	Album
1998	"Scope"	—	—	—	—	—	—	—	—	—	—		Rock on Honorable Ones!!
2000	"The Bitch Song"	—	—	—	—	—	—	—	—	—	—		Let's Do It for Johnny!!
2002	"Girl All the Bad Guys Want"	64	39	17	—	—	15	91	6	8	1	RIAA: Gold; BPI: Platinum	Drunk Enough to Dance
2002	"Emily"	—	—	—	—	—	—	—	—	67	8		Drunk Enough to Dance
2003	"Punk Rock 101"	—	—	38	—	—	—	—	44	43	6		Drunk Enough to Dance
2004	"1985"	23	5	10	22	23	36	—	35	35	—	RIAA: 2× Platinum; BPI: Platinum	A Hangover You Don't Deserve
2005	"Almost"	46	17	21	—	—	—	—	—	100	1	RIAA: Gold	A Hangover You Don't Deserve
2005	"Ohio (Come Back to Texas)"	119	—	35	—	—	—	—	—	—	—		A Hangover You Don't Deserve
2006	"High School Never Ends"	97	30	43	—	—	—	—	20	40	—	RIAA: Gold; BPI: Silver	The Great Burrito Extortion Case
2007	"When We Die"	—	30	49	—	—	—	—	—	—	—		The Great Burrito Extortion Case
2007	"I'm Gay"	—	—	—	—	—	—	—	—	—	—		The Great Burrito Extortion Case
2009	"My Wena"	—	—	—	—	—	—	—	—	—	—		Sorry for Partyin'
2011	"S-S-S-Saturday"	—	—	—	—	—	—	—	—	—	—		Fishin' for Woos
2011	"Turbulence"	—	—	—	—	—	—	—	—	—	—		Fishin' for Woos
2011	"I've Never Done Anything Like This"	—	—	—	—	—	—	—	—	—	—		Fishin' for Woos
2012	"Let's Go To The Pub"	—	—	—	—	—	—	—	—	—	—		One Big Happy!
2013	"Real"	—	—	—	—	—	—	—	—	—	—		Lunch. Drunk. Love.
2013	"Right About Now"	—	—	—	—	—	—	—	—	—	—		Lunch. Drunk. Love.
2013	"From The Rooftops"	—	—	—	—	—	—	—	—	—	—		Lunch. Drunk. Love.
2013	"Envy"	—	—	—	—	—	—	—	—	—	—		Lunch. Drunk. Love.
2019	"Sometimes I Don't Mind"	—	—	—	—	—	—	—	—	—	—		Don't Mind If We Do
2019	"Let Your Love Flow"	—	—	—	—	—	—	—	—	—	—		Don't Mind If We Do
2019	"Two Tickets to Paradise"	—	—	—	—	—	—	—	—	—	—		Don't Mind If We Do
2019	"HRSA"	—	—	—	—	—	—	—	—	—	—		Don't Mind If We Do
2020	"Alexa Bliss"	—	—	—	—	—	—	—	72	—	—		Pop Drunk Snot Bread
2020	"Already Gone"	—	—	—	—	—	—	—	—	—	—		Don't Mind If We Do
2020	"When The Angels Sing"	—	—	—	—	—	—	—	—	—	—		Don't Mind If We Do
2020	"Erase Me (feat. 10k.Caash)"	—	—	—	—	—	—	—	—	—	—		Don't Mind If We Do
2021	"Getting Old Sucks (But Everybody's Doing It)"	—	—	—	—	—	—	—	—	—	—		Pop Drunk Snot Bread
2021	"Where's the Love (feat. Hanson)"	—	—	—	—	—	—	—	—	—	—		Don't Mind If We Do
2021	"Killin' 'Em With Kindness"	—	—	—	—	—	—	—	—	—	—		Pop Drunk Snot Bread
2022	"I Wanna Be Brad Pitt"	—	—	—	—	—	—	—	—	—	—		Pop Drunk Snot Bread
2023	"Flowers"	—	—	—	—	—	—	—	—	—	—		Don't Mind If We Do
2023	"1985 - BFS version"	—	—	—	—	—	—	—	—	—	—		Songs People Actually Liked - Vol. 2
2024	"Award Show Taylor Swift"	—	—	—	—	—	—	—	—	—	—		Non-album singles
2024	"Don't You Want Me (feat. Rival Town and The Anti-Queens)"	—	—	—	—	—	—	—	—	—	—		Non-album singles
2025	"The Rock Show"	—	—	—	—	—	—	—	—	—	—		Non-album singles
2025	"A-Hole (Live and Hungover)"	—	—	—	—	—	—	—	—	—	—		A Hangover You Definitely Deserve
2025	"Ridiculous (Live and Hungover)"	—	—	—	—	—	—	—	—	—	—		A Hangover You Definitely Deserve
2025	"Holding On To That Hate"	—	—	—	—	—	—	—	—	—	—		Non-album singles
2025	"Actually Romantic"	—	—	—	—	—	—	—	—	—	—		Non-album singles
2025	"Endless Possibility (feat. Punk Rock Factory and Wheatus)"	—	—	—	—	—	—	—	—	—	—		Non-album singles
2026	"I'm Just a Kid"	—	—	—	—	—	—	—	—	—	—		Non-album singles
2026	"In Too Deep"	—	—	—	—	—	—	—	—	—	—		Non-album singles

== Videography ==
=== Video albums ===
Year	Album details
2008	Bowling for Soup: Live and Very Attractive: Released: September 2, 2008; Label: Jive/Zomba; Format: 2DVD, DL
2016	Acoustic in a Freakin’ English Church!: Released: December 16, 2016; Label: Brando/Que-so; Format: DVD
2018	Live from Brixton: Older, Fatter, Still the Greatest Ever!: Released: December 7, 2018; Label: Brando/Que-So; Format: DVD
TBA	Bowling for Soup: My Home Town: To be released: TBA; Format: DVD

=== Music videos ===
Year	Title	Director(s)	Album
1995	"Thirteen"		Bowling for Soup
1996	"Cody"		Cell Mates
2000	"The Bitch Song"		Let's Do It for Johnny!
2002	"Girl All the Bad Guys Want"	Smith n' Borin	Drunk Enough to Dance
2002	"Emily"		Drunk Enough to Dance
2003	"Punk Rock 101"	Smith n' Borin	Drunk Enough to Dance
2004	"1985"	Smith n' Borin	A Hangover You Don't Deserve
2004	"Gilligan's Island Theme"	Smith n' Borin	Bowling for Soup Goes to the Movies
2004	"Almost"	Smith n' Borin	A Hangover You Don't Deserve
2005	"I Melt with You"	Smith n' Borin	Sky High (Original Soundtrack); Bowling for Soup Goes to the Movies
2006	"High School Never Ends"	Frank Borin	The Great Burrito Extortion Case
2007	"When We Die"	Max Nichols	The Great Burrito Extortion Case
2007	"I'm Gay"		The Great Burrito Extortion Case
2009	"My Wena"	Max Nichols	Sorry for Partyin'
2009	"My Wena" (Puppy Version)		Sorry for Partyin'
2009	"No Hablo Inglés"	Steve Jocz	Sorry for Partyin'
2011	"S-S-S-Saturday"	Merritt Fields	Fishin' for Woos
2011	"Turbulence"	Jaret Reddick & Heath Balderston	Fishin' for Woos
2012	"Let's Go to the Pub"	Merritt Fields	Bowling for Soup Presents One Big Happy!
2012	"Love Ya, Love Ya, Love Ya" (feat. Kelly Ogden from The Dollyrots)		Bowling for Soup Presents One Big Happy!
2013	"Real"	Built By Ninjas	Lunch. Drunk. Love.
2013	"Right About Now"	Built By Ninjas and Crocker Productions	Lunch. Drunk. Love.
2013	"Envy"	Built By Ninjas and Crocker Productions	Lunch. Drunk. Love.
2013	"Circle"	Built By Ninjas and Crocker Productions	Lunch. Drunk. Love.
2013	"Critically Distained"	Built By Ninjas and Crocker Productions	Lunch. Drunk. Love.
2016	"Don't Be a Dick"	Chris Fafalios	Drunk Dynasty
2018	"Catalyst"	Jaret Reddick	Drunk Dynasty
2020	"Alexa Bliss"	Jason Whitbeck	Pop Drunk Snot Bread
2021	"Getting Old Sucks (But Everybody’s Doing It)"	Michael Roche	Pop Drunk Snot Bread
2021	"Where's the Love" (feat. Hanson)	Dave Pearson	Don't Mind If We Do
2021	"Killin' 'Em with Kindness"	Jaret Reddick & Ted Felicetti	Pop Drunk Snot Bread
2022	"I Wanna Be Brad Pitt"	Scott Felix	Pop Drunk Snot Bread
2022	"Hello Anxiety"	Scott Felix	Pop Drunk Snot Bread
2023	"Flowers"	Jaret Reddick & Sean Timothy	Don't Mind If We Do
2023	"Hey Mario"	Héctor Romero	Don't Mind If We Do
2023	"1985 (BFS Version)"	Cole Rhodes-Dow	Songs People Actually Liked - Volume 2
2023	"High School Never Ends (BFS Version)"	Jindra Vraga & Patrik Hedbavny	Songs People Actually Liked - Volume 2
2024	"Trucker Hat (BFS Version)"	Dave Sokol	Songs People Actually Liked - Volume 2
2025	"Friends O' Mine (BFS Version)"	Dave Sokol	Songs People Actually Liked - Volume 2
2025	"The Rock Show"		Non-album single
2025	"Almost (BFS Version)"	Ray Keogh	Songs People Actually Liked - Volume 2
2025	"Trucker Hat (Live and Stoked)"	Cloudberry Animations	Stoked on Trent
2025	"Two-Seater (BFS Version)"	Dave Sokol	Songs People Actually Liked - Volume 2
2025	"A-Hole (Live and Hungover)"	Dave Kai-Piper	A Hangover You Definitely Deserve
2025	"Ridiculous (Live and Hungover)"	Dave Kai-Piper	A Hangover You Definitely Deserve
2025	"Shut Up And Smile (Live and Hungover)"	Dave Kai-Piper	A Hangover You Definitely Deserve
2025	"Holding On To That Hate"		Non-album singles
2025	"Endless Possibility"		Non-album singles
2026	"I'm Just a Kid"	Amy Russell	Non-album singles
2026	"In Too Deep"	Jindra Vraga	Non-album singles

== Other appearances ==
Year	Song	Release	Notes
2001	"Greatest Day"	Max Keeble's Big Move	
2001	"Jimmy Neutron Theme"	Jimmy Neutron: Boy Genius; Jimmy Neutron: Boy Genius soundtrack	
2002	"Greatest Day"	Crossroads soundtrack	
2002	"Suckerpunch"	Crossroads	
2002	"Valentino"	Rocket Power: Race Across New Zealand	
2002	"Girl All the Bad Guys Want"	The New Guy	
2002	"The Last Rock Show"	Malcolm in the Middle, episode: "Family Reunion"	
2002	"Five O'Clock World"	Drew Carey Show intro theme for two episodes, 2002–2003	
2003	"...Baby One More Time"	Freaky Friday soundtrack Freaky Friday	
2003	"Girl All the Bad Guys Want"	Now That's What I Call Music! 13	
2003	"I Ran (So Far Away)"	Knights of the Zodiac intro theme, 2003	
2003	"Greatest Day"	Dickie Roberts: Former Child Star	
2003	"Punk Rock 101"	NHL 2004	
2003	"I Ran (So Far Away)"	Backyard Wrestling	
2003	"Punk Rock 101"	Backyard Wrestling	
2004	"Here We Go"	Scooby-Doo 2: Monsters Unleashed soundtrack Scooby-Doo 2: Monsters Unleashed	
2004	"1985"	Now That's What I Call Music! 17	
2004	"Gilligan's Island Theme"	The Real Gilligan's Island intro theme, 2004–2005	
2005	"The Bare Necessities"	DisneyMania 3	
2005	"Li'l Red Riding Hood"	Cursed	The film begins with the band playing the song on stage.
2005	"Undertow"	Summerland soundtrack	
2005	"I Melt with You"	Sky High	
2005	"1985"	Ozzfest: 10th Anniversary	Live Recording
2005	"1985"	Comedy Central Roast of Pamela Anderson	The song plays at the beginning of the special.
2005	"Ghostbusters"	Just Like Heaven	
2005	"Almost"	Dirty Deeds	
2005	"Guard My Heart"	HBO movie Sardines	
2006	"1985"	SingStar Rocks!	
2006	"I Melt with You"	Ice Age 2: The Meltdown (trailer)	
2006	"Punk Rock 101"	Zoom	
2006	"I Ran (So Far Away)"	National Lampoon's Van Wilder: The Rise of Taj	
2007	"Greatest Day"	The Last Day of Summer	
2007	"Today is Gonna Be a Great Day"	Phineas and Ferb intro theme, 2007–2015, 2025-present	
2007	"London Bridge"	A mock music video of "London Bridge" by Fergie was performed exclusively for Yahoo! Music. Also a single in the UK.	
2008	"(Ready or Not) Omaha Nebraska"	Featured at the end of one episode of American Idol season 7	
2009	"High School Never Ends"	17 Again (trailer)	
2009	"Today is Gonna Be a Great Day"	Phineas and Ferb, episode "Phineas and Ferb's Quantum Boogaloo"	The band appears in the episode and performs part of the song.
2009	"Today is Gonna Be a Great Day"	Phineas and Ferb soundtrack	
2009	"Winter Vacation"	Phineas and Ferb, episode "Phineas and Ferb Christmas Vacation"	
2010	"No Hablo Ingles"	Shrek Forever After (trailer)	
2010	"There's A Adventure Begins"	Get Ed The Movie	
2010	"Winter Vacation"	Phineas and Ferb: Holiday Favorites	
2011	"Michael Ian Black (Taco Bell)"	Campaign song for Michael Ian Black to be the Taco Bell spokesman	Re-write of "No Hablo Inglés"
2011	"Stacy's Mom"	Released as part of the "I've Never Done Anything Like This" single	Fountains of Wayne cover
2012	"Thank God It's Summer (TGIS)"	Released on the Crappy Records Presents: Have a Crappy Summer compilation	
2014	"St. Jimmy"	"Kerrang! Does Green Day's American Idiot"	Green Day cover
2024	"Friend Like Me"	A Whole New Sound	

- In an episode of My Name Is Earl, Earl's brother, Randy Hickey, sings "High School Never Ends."
- "1985" was featured on an episode of Pimp my Ride in the UK.
- The band performed several more songs on the Phineas and Ferb soundtrack credited as the fictional band Love Handel.
