= Songs People Actually Liked – Volume 1 =

Greatest hits album by Bowling for Soup
- Released: January 27, 2015
- Studios: Panhandle House Studios; Denton, Texas; The Daycare; Highland Village, Texas; The Lair; L.A., California; The Tackle Box; Hollywood, California
- Genre: Pop-punk
- Length: 58:19
- Labels: Brando; Que-so; Absolute
- Producers: Jarinus (Jaret Reddick & Linus of Hollywood)

Bowling for Soup chronology
Lunch. Drunk. Love. (2013)	Songs People Actually Liked – Volume 1 (2015)	Drunk Dynasty (2016)

Professional ratings
Review scores
Source	Rating
AllMusic	3.5/5 stars

Songs People Actually Liked – Volume 1 – The First 10 Years (1994–2003) is a compilation album by the American rock band Bowling for Soup, released on January 27, 2015. The compilation was completely fan-funded, as well as being released on the band's own record label like their previous albums. The band celebrated their 20th anniversary on June 4, 2014, and for a birthday present, Bowling for Soup decided to re-record an album of their best and best-known songs, partly in response to a "best-of" album released by their former record label that was created without the band's knowledge of and or any input. The album contains 17 re-recordings of songs from their low-budget albums and one new song.

The next volume, Songs People Actually Liked – Volume 2, was released on August 25, 2023, featuring the band's hits from 2004 to 2009.

== Production and recording ==
On February 17, 2014, the band announced they teamed up with PledgeMusic again, this time to launch a fully fan-funded campaign to record a greatest hits album. The band would be reaching their 20th anniversary later that year and the album would cover the band's first 10 years together. The album was to contain re-recordings of 17 songs plus one new one. Like their previous Pledge campaign, exclusive pre-order items would include shirts, posters, autographed items, and lithographs. The campaign would also include the rare "Drunk Enough To Dance Demos" CD and a book of every Bowling For Soup song lyrics hand-written lyrics with commentary and notes. 5% of the pledges would again be donated to Sweet Relief an organization that provides financial assistance to all types of career musicians who are struggling to make ends meet while facing illness, disability, or age-related problems. The band would post monthly updates to their pledgers throughout the process.

The track listing was announced with a total listing of 18 songs which included the title for their new song "20 years (That's A Lot Of Beer)" and "Shut Up And Smile" which ended up not being included on the final release, instead the song "Suckerpunch" was. In June and July the band would perform several dates at Warped Tour and at Download Fest. A video announcement from Chandler gave news that the album was going to be delayed due to an injury he received. Because of Erik's injury, the album was supposed to be released in June to commemorate their 20th anniversary, but would be pushed back to January 2015.

An October 2014 update showed Burney recording guitar solos for "Thirteen" and "Cody". Vocals were also recorded and artwork was being approved that month. Vocals, mixing and mastering were being finished in November. Reddick informed pledgers that they wanted lyric videos for every song from the album and asked fans to choose a songs and submit it. If the submission was chosen and allowed it would be posted on BFStv and the winners would be sent at least $100 in free goodies. Over a year had past since the project began when on May 20, 2015, the commentary for each track was given to pledgers.

== Track listing ==
No.	Title	Writer(s)	Original album	Length
1.	"Last Rock Show"	Jaret Reddick	Drunk Enough to Dance (2002)	1:29
2.	"Suckerpunch"	Reddick	Tell Me When to Whoa (1998)	3:18
3.	"Emily"	Reddick; Butch Walker	Drunk Enough to Dance	3:28
4.	"Girl All the Bad Guys Want"	Reddick; Walker	Drunk Enough to Dance	3:16
5.	"You and Me"	Reddick	Tell Me When to Whoa	4:01
6.	"The Bitch Song"	Reddick	Tell Me When to Whoa	3:17
7.	"Scope"	Reddick; Eric Delegard	Rock on Honorable Ones!! (1998)	3:34
8.	"2113"	Reddick; Erik Chandler	Rock on Honorable Ones!!	4:40
9.	"Punk Rock 101"	Reddick; Walker	Drunk Enough to Dance (2003 rerelease)	3:04
10.	"Belgium"	Reddick; Chandler	Rock on Honorable Ones!!	3:20
11.	"Life After Lisa"	Reddick; Walker	Drunk Enough to Dance	3:00
12.	"Cody"	Reddick; Burney; Chandler; Cody Garcia	Cell Mates (1996)	4:26
13.	"Thirteen"	Reddick	Bowling for Soup (1994)	3:01
14.	"Dance with You"	Reddick	Tell Me When to Whoa	3:29
15.	"Koolaid"	Reddick	Cell Mates	3:42
16.	"Pictures He Drew"	Reddick	Let's Do It for Johnny! (2000)	3:25
17.	"Sandwich"	Reddick	Bowling for Soup	3:48
18.	"20 Years (That's a Lot of Beers)"	Reddick; Linus of Hollywood		3:21

== Personnel ==
- Jaret Reddick – lead vocals, guitar
- Chris Burney – guitar, backing vocals
- Erik Chandler – bass, backing vocals
- Gary Wiseman – drums, backing vocals

Production

- Executive Producer: Adam Goldberg
- Produced by: Jarinus (Linus of Hollywood & Jaret Reddick)
- Recorded at: Panhandle House Studios – Denton, TX, The Daycare – Highland Village, TX The Lair – LA, CA and the Tacklebox – Hollywood, CA
- Mixed by: Jay Ruston
- Mastered by: Paul Logus
- Management: Mike Swinford & Paul Nugent at Rainmakers Artists
- Marketing Champ: Sarah Steinbrecher
- Package Design: Brad Bond
- Photography by: Will Bolton
- Album Photography: Scott Cole
