= Live and Very Attractive =

Live album by Bowling for Soup
- Released: July 7, 2008
- Recorded: October 2007
- Venue: O2 Apollo Manchester
- Genre: Pop-punk; alternative rock
- Length: 1:14:49
- Label: Jive; Zomba
- Director: King Hollis
- Producer: Michael Cain; Melina McKinnon

Bowling for Soup chronology
Live and Very Attractive (2008)	Live in a Freakin English Church (2016)

Live and Very Attractive is the first live DVD and live album by American punk band Bowling for Soup, released on July 7, 2008. Live and Very Attractive was released as a 2-disc set: one disc featuring the live show and documentary and the second featuring the band's commentary. In the United Kingdom, Live and Very Attractive was released as a 3-disc including a bonus CD version of the concert along with the two DVDs.

Live and Very Attractive was recorded at the O2 Apollo in Manchester, during the band's UK "Get Happy Tour" in October 2007.

== Track listing ==
No.	Title	Writer(s)	Length
1.	"Intro"		0:33
2.	"My Hometown"	Jaret Reddick	2:48
3.	"Emily"	Reddick	4:10
4.	"Almost"	Reddick, Butch Walker	5:33
5.	"Suckerpunch"	Reddick	4:06
6.	"High School Never Ends"	Reddick, Adam Schlesinger	4:48
7.	"Belgium"	Reddick	4:56
8.	"Ohio (Come Back to Texas)"	Reddick, Zac Maloy, Ted Bruner	6:40
9.	"The Bitch Song"	Reddick	4:23
10.	"I'm Gay"	Reddick	5:32
11.	"The Last Rock Show/Punk Rock 101"	Reddick ("The Last Rock Show"); Reddick, Walker ("Punk Rock 101")	5:58
12.	"When We Die"	Reddick, Walker	5:23
13.	"Girl All the Bad Guys Want"	Reddick, Walker	7:05
14.	"1985"	Reddick, Mitch Allan, John Allen	8:36
15.	"Ring of Fire" (Johnny Cash cover)	June Carter, Merle Kilgore	4:27
Total length:			74:49

== Release history ==
Country	Date
United Kingdom	July 7, 2008
United States	September 2, 2008

== Personnel ==
Bowling for Soup

- Jaret Reddick — lead vocals and rhythm guitar
- Erik Chandler — bass guitar and backing vocals
- Chris Burney — lead guitar and backing vocals
- Gary Wiseman — drums

== Charts ==
Chart (2008)	Peak position	Ref(s)
UK Music Video Chart (OCC)	4	
