= Fishin' for Woos =

Studio album by Bowling for Soup
- Released: April 25, 2011
- Recorded: June 1–25, 2010
- Studios: Valve Studios, Dallas, TX; The Tackle Box, Hollywood, CA
- Genre: Pop-punk
- Length: 42:17; 45:38 (U.K. Edition); 45:37 (U.S. iTunes Edition)
- Labels: Que-so; Absolute; Brando
- Producers: Jarinus (Jaret Reddick & Linus of Hollywood)

Bowling for Soup chronology
Merry Flippin' Christmas: Volumes 1 and 2 (2011)	Fishin' for Woos (2011)	The Dollyrots vs. Bowling for Soup (2011)

Bowling for Soup studio chronology
Sorry for Partyin' (2009)	Fishin' for Woos (2011)	Bowling for Soup Presents: One Big Happy! (2013)

Singles from Fishin' for Woos
- 1. "S-S-S-Saturday" Released: January 11, 2011; 2. "Turbulence" Released: July 18, 2011; 3. "I've Never Done Anything Like This" Released: October 10, 2011

Fishin' for Woos is the eighth studio album by the American rock band Bowling for Soup. It was released on Que-so Records/Brando Records in the United Kingdom on April 25, 2011, and worldwide on April 26, 2011.

== Release ==
The album was recorded over a three-week span in June 2010. Frontman Jaret Reddick stated the album would be released in spring 2011. Prior to the album's release, the band planned to release a six-track EP, titled Fishin' for Woos. The track listing for Fishin' for Woos was announced to be "Let's Pretend We're Not in Love," "Dear Megan Fox," "Here's Your Freakin' Song," "Evil All Around the World," and a song the band had been playing for years, but had previously never recorded, "Guard My Heart." Reddick stated that the album would be released on a label, after Fishin' for Woos is released independently.

The EP was originally set for release October 5, 2010, but Reddick announced on September 24 via Twitter, "The bad news: The new EP release is being pushed back. The Good news: new FULL album sooner, a free song for you, & MUCH more! Stay tuned." Later that same day, the band put up a new song called "Friends Chicks Guitars" as a free download on their official site. When asked if any songs from Fishin' for Woos would be on the album, Reddick responded with "maybe 2 or 3." The band released another new song titled "Let's Pretend We're Not in Love," exclusively through their BFSArmy Fancorps site in November 2010. Reddick announced via Twitter on November 15, 2010, that the new album has a tentative release date of May 3, 2011. This was further confirmed two days later, via the Bowling for Soup Twitter, that stated Merry Flippin' Christmas Volume 1 would be released on iTunes and CD, the band's first two albums would be re-released, and there will be a new album and tour in May.

Reddick announced in his eleventh podcast that instead of releasing an EP before the band's next full-length album, the band would be releasing just the album, which is currently set to have twelve songs and be titled Fishin' for Woos. Reddick also featured another new song, titled "I've Never Done Anything Like This" (feat. Kay Hanley), during his eleventh podcast.^{[A]} It was announced in January 2011 that the band had signed to Razor & Tie, but later changed to Brando Records. To help promote the album, the band embarked on the "Fishin' for Woos Tour" beginning in the spring of 2011 in the United States.

== Musical style ==
Reddick stated in his ninth podcast that fans of Drunk Enough to Dance and A Hangover You Don't Deserve will like the album. Bassist/vocalist Erik Chandler said in an interview with Rocksins.com, that the album "feels very much like a 2002–2004 Bowling for Soup sound."

== Singles ==
The band played what is said to be the first single off Fishin' for Woos, titled "S-S-S-Saturday" (also referred to as "Saturday Night"), live on ABC for the Professional Bowlers Association Tournament of Champions finals on January 22. Reddick has since mentioned making a music video for the song, that will also allow fans to participate. The band released the song as a free download for joining their e-mail list prior to the event. The song was released for download on iTunes and streaming on MySpace on January 17, 2011. The video to "S-S-S-Saturday" was released on April 15. The band has announced that "Turbulence" would be the second single from the album. The band had filmed a music video for the song with Built By Ninjas. The album's third single was I've Never Done Anything Like This, and the band re-recorded "The Bitch Song" and a cover of Fountains of Wayne's Stacy's Mom for the single's b-sides.

== Reception ==
Professional ratings
Aggregate scores
Source	Rating
Metacritic	53/100
Review scores
Source	Rating
About.com	4/5 stars
AllMusic	3/5 stars
BLARE	2.5/5 stars
Drowned in Sound	5/10 stars
Kerrang!	3/5 stars
Rock Sound	7/10 stars

The album received mixed reviews. Most reviewers noted the similarity of the music to the band's previous releases; About.com said that "the sound is more of what we expect and love from BFS; it's pop punk polish that unabashedly leans toward the poppier side of things" and gave Fishin' for Woos four out of five stars, while Allmusic gave the album a rating of three out of five stars and said that "more of the same isn’t necessarily a bad thing, and that’s certainly what Fishin’ for Woos offers" and Rock Sound rated the album seven out of ten, and said that "Bowling For Soup are back, doing what BFS do best – upbeat, uplifting, foot-tapping songs." In a more critical review, Blare Magazine rated the album 2.5 out of five stars, and said that "[i]t’s clear the boys in BFS fancy themselves quite the humorists, but the gags heard on Fishin’ for Woos are far more likely to elicit groans or eye rolls than yucks."

== Track listing ==
All tracks are written by Jaret Reddick, with additional songwriters listed.

No.	Title	Writer(s)	Length
1.	"Let's Pretend We're Not in Love"		3:09
2.	"Girls in America"	Zac Maloy, Tommy Henrickson	3:09
3.	"S-S-S-Saturday"	Linus of Hollywood	3:06
4.	"What About Us"		3:58
5.	"Here's Your Freakin' Song"	Linus of Hollywood	3:55
6.	"This Ain't My Day"		3:12
7.	"Smiley Face (It's All Good)"		3:02
8.	"Turbulence" (feat. Gabriel Mann)	Linus of Hollywood	3:59
9.	"I've Never Done Anything Like This" (feat. Kay Hanley)	Linus of Hollywood	3:15
10.	"Friends Chicks Guitars"		3:42
11.	"Guard My Heart" (2010)	Erik Chandler	4:00
12.	"Graduation Trip"		3:57
Total length:			42:17

Fishin' for Woos Bonus Tracks (Vinyl only release)
No.	Title	Writer(s)	Length
1.	"Evil All Over the World"	Linus of Hollywood	3:11
2.	"My Girlfriend's an Alcoholic"	Emanuel Kiriakou	3:21

U.S. iTunes Edition
No.	Title	Writer(s)	Length
13.	"Dear Megan Fox"	Mitch Allan	3:20

U.K. Edition
No.	Title	Writer(s)	Length
13.	"My Girlfriend's an Alcoholic"	Kiriakou	3:21

Japan Edition
No.	Title	Writer(s)	Length
13.	"Evil All Over the World"	Linus of Hollywood	3:11

Deluxe Edition
No.	Title	Writer(s)	Length
13.	"Dear Megan Fox"	Allan	3:20
14.	"Evil All Over the World"	Linus of Hollywood	3:31
15.	"My Girlfriend's an Alcoholic"	Kiriakou	3:20
16.	"Here's Your Freakin' Song - Acoustic 2025"	Linus of Hollywood	3:37
17.	"Smiley Face (It's All Good) - Acoustic 2025"		2:57
Total length:			59:35

=== B-Sides ===
- "Sixteen Years, That's a Lot of Beers" (never finished or recorded for the record, reworked instead as "20 Years, That's a Lot of Beers" on Songs That People Actually Liked, Vol. 1: The First 10 Years in 2015)
- "What About Us" (Acoustic; part of SXSW4Japan album for 2011 Tōhoku earthquake and tsunami relief efforts) – 3:52
- "The Bitch Song (2011)" (B-side of "I've Never Done Anything Like This" single) – 3:18
- "Stacy's Mom" (Fountains of Wayne cover; B-side of "I've Never Done Anything Like This" single) – 3:14
- Frontman Jaret Reddick stated on Twitter the band planned to have a new version of "Belgium" on the album, but there was not enough time.

== Personnel ==
Bowling for Soup

- Jaret Reddick – lead vocals, rhythm guitar
- Erik Chandler – bass, vocals
- Chris Burney – lead guitar, vocals
- Gary Wiseman – drums

Additional musicians

- Gabriel Mann (of The Rescues) – piano and vocals on "Turbulence"
- Kay Hanley – vocals on "I've Never Done Anything Like This"
- The Dollyrots, Kay Hanley, Rebecca Black, Katie Ogden, Linus of Hollywood, and Jaret Reddick – gang vocals, angry girl talk, and party sounds
- Rob Felicetti – acoustic guitar and vocals on deluxe acoustic re-recordings

Production

- Jarinus (Linus of Hollywood and Jaret Reddick), – producers
- Mitch Allan – co-producer ("Dear Megan Fox")
- Casey Diiorio – engineering at Valve Studios, assisted by Nick Evans
- Linus of Hollywood – additional engineering at the Tackle Box, additional guitar, keyboards, backing vocals, and percussion
- Jay Ruston – mixing
- Stephen Marsh – mastering
- Izzy Ray Brown – illustrations

== Chart performance ==
Chart performance for Fishin' for Woos
Chart (2011)	Peak position
Scottish Albums (Official Charts)	92
UK Albums (Official Charts)	66
UK Album Downloads (Official Charts)	67
UK Independent Albums (Official Charts)	10
UK Physical Albums (OCC)	66
UK Rock & Metal Albums (Official Charts)	5
US Billboard 200	189
US Independent Albums (Billboard)	37

== Notes ==
- A Featured in frontman Jaret Reddick's eleventh Bowling for Soup podcast, released November 18, 2010.
