= Drunk Dynasty =

Studio album by Bowling for Soup
- Released: October 14, 2016
- Recorded: 2016
- Studios: Panhandle House Studios, Denton, TX; The Lair, Los Angeles, CA; Gummi Studios, Hollywood, CA; The Daycare, Prosper, TX
- Genres: Punk rock; pop-punk; power pop
- Length: 36:05
- Labels: Brando; Que-so; Absolute
- Producers: Jarinus (Jaret Reddick & Linus of Hollywood)

Bowling for Soup chronology
Songs People Actually Liked – Volume 1 (2015)	Drunk Dynasty (2016)	Acoustic In A Freakin' English Church! (2016)

Bowling for Soup studio chronology
Lunch. Drunk. Love. (2013)	Drunk Dynasty (2016)	Pop Drunk Snot Bread (2022)

Professional ratings
Review scores
Source	Rating
New Noise Magazine	3/5 stars
Stereoboard	4/5 stars

Drunk Dynasty is the tenth studio album by the American rock band Bowling for Soup, released on October 14, 2016. It was initially intended to be a 6-8 song EP but over the time spent in the studio recording there were still songs leftover, so the band decided to release a full-length album instead. The album was entirely fan funded through PledgeMusic, and the band provided regular updates to pledgers throughout the making of the album. This was the first Bowling for Soup studio album to miss the US Billboard 200 since Let's Do It for Johnny!, however the album did chart at no. 43 and no. 33 respectively on the Top Rock Albums and Top Independent Albums charts.

It is the final studio album to feature bass guitarist Erik Chandler before his official departure on January 12, 2019.

== Production and recording ==
On May 11, 2016, the band announced they have launched a new campaign project again using the fan funded PledgeMusic to record an EP. The campaign reached its goal on May 20. The next day, Reddick presented the new album cover illustrated by Dave Pearson of the band Lacey. In June, the band would enter the studio in Denton, Texas. Day one in the recording studio, "two songs done on drums and rhythm guitar...one on bass. We start tomorrow with two more..."

The first titled song, "Shit to Do", was announced on June 7 and that Chandler was recording bass to it. Later that day, a second song title was given with a video clip of Wiseman recording "She Used to Be Mine". A third update with a new song and a video clip showed Burney recording "Go to Bed Mad". Wiseman began tracking drums on June 8 for "Don't Be a Dick" and Reddick would also show a short audio clip of the song's drums, bass and rhythm guitar for the first verse. On June 9, they were tracking "Beer on a Sunday" which Reddick said "We did this one totally live!".

In July, vocals would be recorded, and on July 8, an update from Reddick stated, "I am super happy to announce that instead of an EP, Drunk Dynasty will be a FULL album!" and that three more songs would be recorded next month. In August, the band would go to Los Angeles, California to record three more songs at The Lair. A video update on September 6 showed that Reddick was finishing vocals to "She Doesn't Think That It's Ever Gonna Work Out". Mixing and mastering would begin mid-month. A video with Reddick mentioned that The Dollyrots' Kelly Ogden would be singing on "Happy as Happy Gets". The new single "Hey Diane" was released to pledgers on October 1. A digital download of the album was first made available to pledge members on October 13.

== Track listing ==
All songs written by Jarinus except "She Used to Be Mine", "Ever Gonna Work Out", and "Stop Doing That" written by Jaret Reddick and "Hey Jealousy" written by Doug Hopkins.

No.	Title	Length
1.	"She Used to Be Mine"	2:08
2.	"Shit to Do"	3:40
3.	"Hey Diane"	3:38
4.	"Go to Bed Mad"	2:22
5.	"Catalyst"	4:20
6.	"She Doesn't Think That It's Ever Gonna Work Out"	2:59
7.	"Don't Be a Dick"	3:21
8.	"Stop Doing That"	2:31
9.	"Hey Jealousy" (Gin Blossoms cover)	2:59
10.	"As Happy as Happy Gets" (feat. Kelly Ogden)	4:47
11.	"Drinkin Beer on a Sunday"	3:17
Total length:		36:05

== Personnel ==
Bowling for Soup

- Jaret Reddick - vocals, guitar
- Chris Burney - guitars, vocals
- Erik Chandler - bass guitar, vocals
- Gary Wiseman - drums

Additional musicians

- Kelly Ogden - vocals on "As Happy As Happy Gets"
- Linus of Hollywood - additional music and vocals

Production

- Jarinus - producers
- Jay Ruston - mixing (at TRS West)
- John Douglas - assistant mix engineer
- Paul Logus - mastering (at PLX Mastering)
- Dave Pearson - artwork
- Eric Herbst - engineering (at Panhandle House)
- Ace Clayton - assistant engineering (at Panhandle House)
- Lizzy Ostro, Ruda Carvalho, Steve Tippeconnic - engineering (at The Lair)
- Clinton Draper - assistant engineering (at The Lair)
- Linus of Hollywood - engineering (at Gummi Studios)
- Jaret Reddick - engineering (at The Daycare)

== Charts ==
Chart (2016)	Peak position
UK Album Downloads (Official Charts)	63
UK Rock & Metal Albums (Official Charts)	31
US Independent Albums (Billboard)	33
US Top Rock Albums (Billboard)	43
