= Songs People Actually Liked – Volume 2 =

Greatest hits album by Bowling for Soup
- Released: August 25, 2023
- Recorded: 2019–2022
- Studios: Panhandle House Studios in Denton, TX; Soundmind Recording Studio in East Stroudsburg, PA; The Daycare in Prosper, TX; The Tacklebox in Los Angeles, CA
- Genres: Pop-punk; alternative rock
- Length: 48:10
- Labels: Brando; Que-so
- Producers: Jarinus (Jaret Reddick & Linus of Hollywood)

Bowling for Soup chronology
Don't Mind if We Do (2023)	Songs People Actually Liked – Volume 2 (2023)	Bait and Switch: Vol. 1 (2024)

Singles from Songs People Actually Liked – Volume 2
- 1. "1985 (BFS version)" Released: June 6, 2023

Songs People Actually Liked – Volume 2 – The Next 6 Years (2004–2009) is a compilation album by American pop-punk band Bowling for Soup, released on August 25, 2023. It is the band's second rerecorded greatest hits album, after the first volume in 2015. Volume 2 includes 14 rerecorded songs from their albums A Hangover You Don't Deserve (2004), The Great Burrito Extortion Case (2006), and Sorry for Partyin' (2009).

It is the last Bowling for Soup album to feature Chris Burney on lead guitar, as the band announced his retirement in 2025.

== Background ==
Much like its predecessor, the album was made partly in response to Playlist: The Very Best of Bowling for Soup, released by their former record label, Jive Records, that was created without the band's knowledge or input. Reddick unveiled the cover art for the second volume on Instagram in February 2020.

After releasing Volume 2, lead singer Jaret Reddick stated,

Having a "Greatest Hits" is one of things you sort of dream about as a kid, but deep down, it’s more of a fantasy really. Now here we are releasing our second and we have nearly made it to half way through our career. I was nervous about these songs. Sonically, on the originals, they were already "there." But I think like everything in our band, the years add something to the luster, and it certainly happened here! The songs are still intact with their original selves. But I think you will feel a different energy. In a good way.

== Track listing ==
Adapted from Apple Music.

No.	Title	Writer(s)	Original album	Length
1.	"1985 (BFS version)"	Jaret Reddick; Mitch Allan; John Allen	A Hangover You Don't Deserve (2004)	3:07
2.	"High School Never Ends (BFS version)"	Reddick; Adam Schlesinger	The Great Burrito Extortion Case (2006)	3:26
3.	"Almost (BFS version)"	Reddick; Butch Walker	A Hangover You Don't Deserve	3:34
4.	"When We Die (BFS version)"	Reddick; Walker	The Great Burrito Extortion Case	4:09
5.	"Ohio (Come Back to Texas) [BFS version]" (featuring Eli Young Band)	Reddick; Zac Maloy; Ted Bruner	A Hangover You Don't Deserve	3:46
6.	"No Hablo Inglés (BFS version)"	Reddick; Linus of Hollywood	Sorry for Partyin' (2009)	3:32
7.	"Friends O' Mine (BFS version)"	Reddick; Miles Zuniga; Tony Scalzo	A Hangover You Don't Deserve	2:04
8.	"My Hometown (BFS version)"	Reddick	A Hangover You Don't Deserve	3:02
9.	"My Wena (BFS version)"	Reddick; Linus of Hollywood	Sorry for Partyin'	2:48
10.	"BFFF (BFS version)"	Reddick	Sorry for Partyin'	3:50
11.	"I'm Gay (BFS version)"	Reddick	The Great Burrito Extortion Case	3:35
12.	"Trucker Hat (BFS version)"	Reddick; Walker	A Hangover You Don't Deserve	3:10
13.	"Two-Seater (BFS version)"	Reddick; Maloy	A Hangover You Don't Deserve	3:59
14.	"Smoothie King (BFS version)"	Reddick; Maloy	A Hangover You Don't Deserve	4:02
Total length:				48:10

== Personnel ==
=== Bowling for Soup ===
- Jaret Reddick – lead vocals, rhythm guitar
- Chris Burney – lead guitar, backing vocals
- Rob Felicetti – bass, backing vocals
- Gary Wiseman – drums, backing vocals

=== Production ===
- Jarinus (Jaret Reddick & Linus of Hollywood) – producer
- Linus of Hollywood – mixing
- Paul Logus – mastering
- Ted Felicetti – additional backing vocals
- Scott Cole – album photography
