= I've Never Done Anything Like This =

Single by Bowling for Soup feat. Kay Hanley

from the album Fishin' for Woos
- B-side: "Stacy's Mom"; "The Bitch Song"
- Released: October 10, 2011
- Recorded: June 1–25, 2010; Valve Studios; Dallas, TX; The Tackle Box; Hollywood, CA
- Genre: Pop-punk
- Length: 3:15
- Label: Que-so; Brando
- Songwriters: Jaret Reddick; Linus of Hollywood
- Producers: Jarinus (Linus of Hollywood and Jaret Reddick)

Bowling for Soup singles chronology
"Turbulence" (2011)	"I've Never Done Anything Like This" (2011)	"Circle" (2013)

"I've Never Done Anything Like This" is the third single from Bowling for Soup's eleventh studio album Fishin' for Woos. The song features guest vocals from Kay Hanley of Letters to Cleo. The three-song single was released digitally on October 10, 2011. The single also contains a cover of Fountains of Wayne's "Stacy's Mom" (a song commonly misattributed to Bowling for Soup) and a re-recording of "The Bitch Song" off Bowling for Soup's 2000 album Let's Do It for Johnny!

== "Stacy's Mom" cover ==
The Fountains of Wayne song "Stacy's Mom" was frequently misattributed to Bowling For Soup on YouTube and other video sites in the years following its release. Jaret Reddick has said that he regularly encountered fans at concerts who mistakenly thought "Stacy's Mom" was a Bowling for Soup song. Jaret said that by finally releasing their own version of the song, "I’ve basically just taken care of a large part of the population that’s been wrong for years, and I’ve made them right."

== Track listing ==
No.	Title	Writer(s)	Length
1.	"I've Never Done Anything Like This" (featuring Kay Hanley)	Jaret Reddick, Linus of Hollywood	3:15
2.	"Stacy's Mom" (Fountains of Wayne cover)	Adam Schlesinger, Chris Collingwood	3:13
3.	"The Bitch Song" (2011)	Reddick	3:18
