= Bowling for Soup Goes to the Movies =

Bowling For Soup Goes to the Movies

Compilation album by Bowling for Soup
- Released: November 15, 2005
- Recorded: 2001–2004
- Genre: Pop-punk
- Length: 45:21; 68:00 (Japanese 2008 Re-Issue)
- Labels: FFROE; Jive; Zomba
- Producers: Jaret Reddick; Casey Diiorio; Eric Delegard; Butch Walker; Russ-T Cobb

Bowling for Soup chronology
A Hangover You Don't Deserve (2004)	Bowling For Soup Goes to the Movies (2005)	The Great Burrito Extortion Case (2006)

Professional ratings
Review scores
Source	Rating
AllMusic	3/5 stars
Melodic	2/5 stars

Bowling for Soup Goes to the Movies is a collection of Bowling for Soup's songs from movies and television, and their fourth album with Jive Records. It contains both covers and previously unreleased originals.

== Production and recording ==
Jaret Reddick said in a Facebook post "At the end of the touring cycle for the Hangover album, it was pretty clear we needed a break. A close friend from the movie and TV side of Jive Records, Jonathan McHugh, came up the with the idea of putting a collection of songs we had done for film and TV, whether they got used or not, into one collection."

== Track listing ==
No.	Title	Writer(s)	Length
1.	"Jimmy Neutron Theme"	Jaret Reddick, Brian T. Causey	2:09
2.	"(Ready or Not) Omaha Nebraska"	Reddick	3:38
3.	"Greatest Day"	Reddick	3:15
4.	"...Baby One More Time"	Max Martin	3:30
5.	"Here We Go"	Tim Armstrong	3:09
6.	"Undertow"	Reddick, Zac Maloy, Ted Bruner	3:31
7.	"Spanish Harlem"	Jerry Leiber, Phil Spector	1:04
8.	"Li'l Red Riding Hood"	Ronald Blackwell	2:30
9.	"Live It Up"	Reddick, Casey Diiorio	3:09
10.	"Star Song"	Reddick, Butch Walker	3:26
11.	"I Melt with You"	Richard Brown, Michael Conroy, Robert Grey, Gary McDowell, Steven Walker	4:02
12.	"Five O'Clock World"	Allen Reynolds	2:22
13.	"Gilligan's Island Theme"	Sherwood Schwartz, George Wyle	2:25
14.	"Sometimes"	Reddick, Maloy	3:28
15.	"Sick of Myself"	Matthew Sweet	3:42
Total length:			45:21

Japanese 2008 Re-Issue
No.	Title	Writer(s)	Length
16.	"Everyday's a Saturday"	Maloy, Reddick	3:30
17.	"Home Alone"	Reddick, Mitch Allan	3:26
18.	"Straight to Video"	Reddick, Walker	2:48
19.	"Not a Love Song"	Coplan, Reddick	3:36
20.	"Good to Be Me"	Reddick	2:32
21.	"Much More Beautiful Person" (Acoustic)	Reddick, Allan	3:41
22.	"1985" (Live @ VH1)	Reddick, Allan, John Allen	3:25
Total length:			68:00

=== B-sides ===
No.	Title	Writer(s)	Length
1.	"Speed Racer^{[A]}"		0:34
2.	"If You Could See Me Now (Master of Disguise)^{[B]}"	Reddick	3:14

== About the songs ==
=== Original version ===
1. "Jimmy Neutron Theme" from Nickelodeon and Paramount Pictures' Jimmy Neutron: Boy Genius film, released in 2001.
2. "(Ready or Not) Omaha, Nebraska" from ESPN's College World Series. Jaret Reddick of Bowling for Soup admits to writing this in 5 minutes, and says "Everyone at ESPN is crazy!!!"
3. "Greatest Day" Originally written for a Tiger Woods EA Sports video game (but rejected), the song has been featured in Fox's Malcolm in the Middle, Dickie Roberts: Former Child Star, Max Keeble's Big Move, Re-Animated, the Disney Channel original film Go Figure, the Nickelodeon TV film The Last Day of Summer, and the Mary-Kate and Ashley Olsen film Getting There.
4. "...Baby One More Time" This song was written into the movie Freaky Friday after much of the actual movie had already been written. Because the song is written into the dialogue, Bowling for Soup was asked to cover the song at a given tempo. Reddick says, "We couldn't do our usual 'speed it up and add harmonies and it will sound like BFS' approach."
5. "Here We Go" from Scooby-Doo 2: Monsters Unleashed; this song was originally written by Tim Armstrong of The Transplants, Operation Ivy, and Rancid.
6. "Undertow" While the band decided to pass up adding this song to their A Hangover You Don't Deserve album, it was featured on the Summerland soundtrack. Reddick says, "I don't have a copy of that [Summerland] soundtrack, but I am guessing this is one of the strongest tracks on it."
7. "Spanish Harlem" This is the one of only three tracks (excluding the two new tracks), which was not featured on any television show or movie, as a series starring Luis Guzmán passed on the song.
8. "Li'l Red Riding Hood" The movie Cursed opened with this song.
9. "Live It Up" This song is a demo, written with Diiorio using a hook from an unreleased track from Diiorio's band Valve, and is not in any television shows or movies. It was submitted to be on the soundtrack for Shrek 2 but ultimately lost to Counting Crows' "Accidentally in Love".
10. "Star Song" While this song is not in any television shows or movies, it is one of the band's favorite songs and it appears on the re-issue of Drunk Enough to Dance, and as a B-side on the "Punk Rock 101" single release in the UK.
11. "I Melt with You" Featured in the movie Sky High, the song has now been released as the single from the album. Bowling for Soup was asked to cover it by Music Supervisor Lisa Brown, who also asked the band to cover "...Baby One More Time". Though they were a little apprehensive about covering a song that not only has been covered so many times before, but is also a "classic" to the band, they eventually agreed. Bowling for Soup's version has also changed the second line of the song to be more appropriate for children.
12. "Five O'Clock World" The theme of several episodes of Drew Carey Show from 2002 to 2004. [The original, done by the Vogues, was used as the main theme for the show's second season.]
13. "Gilligan's Island Theme" Used for the reality show based on the classic series.
14. "Sometimes" One of the previously unreleased tracks featured on the album.
15. "Sick of Myself" This song was originally covered for the wedding of Lance [the original Bowling for Soup drummer].

=== Japanese Re-Issue ===
1. "Everyday's A Saturday" Originally on the UK Version of The Great Burrito Extortion Case
2. "Home Alone" Originally a digital-only bonus track from Hastings Entertainment for purchasing The Great Burrito Extortion Case
3. "Straight to Video" Originally a digital-only bonus track from Napster for purchasing The Great Burrito Extortion Case. It is featured in Reddick's third podcast
4. "Not a Love Song" Originally a digital-only bonus track from iTunes for purchasing The Great Burrito Extortion Case
5. "Good to Be Me" Originally a digital-only bonus track from Wal-Mart for purchasing The Great Burrito Extortion Case
6. "Much More Beautiful Person (Acoustic)" Originally on the UK Single for "High School Never Ends"
7. "1985 (Live at VH-1)" (previously unreleased)

== Personnel ==
Bowling for Soup:

- Jaret Reddick - lead vocals, rhythm guitar
- Chris Burney - lead guitar
- Erik Chandler - bass guitar, backing vocals
- Gary Wiseman - drums

Bowling for Soup Crew:

- Edo Levi, Greg Lobdell, Sean Bailey, Dave Hale

Production:

- Jaret Reddick - producer (1–9, 11–15)
- Casey Diiorio - producer (2, 4–7, 9, 11, 13)
- Eric Delegard - producer (3)
- Butch Walker - producer (10)
- Russ-T Cobb - producer (14 & 15)
- Jonathan Mchugh and Jaret Reddick - album concept
- Jason Janik - photos
- Sean M. Kinney - art director & illustrator
- Chaz Harper - mastering at Battery Mastering, NYC
- Management: Jeff Roe and Jaret Reddick for the Decibel Collective
- Legal: Michael L. McKoy esq., for Serling, Rooks and Ferara
- Booking: Andy Somers for The Agency Group | Paul Bolton for Helter Skelter (UK/Europe)

== Notes ==
- A Featured in frontman Jaret Reddick's second Bowling for Soup podcast, released November 30, 2009.
- B Featured in frontman Jaret Reddick's seventh Bowling for Soup podcast, released March 10, 2010.
