= Bowling for Soup =

American rock band

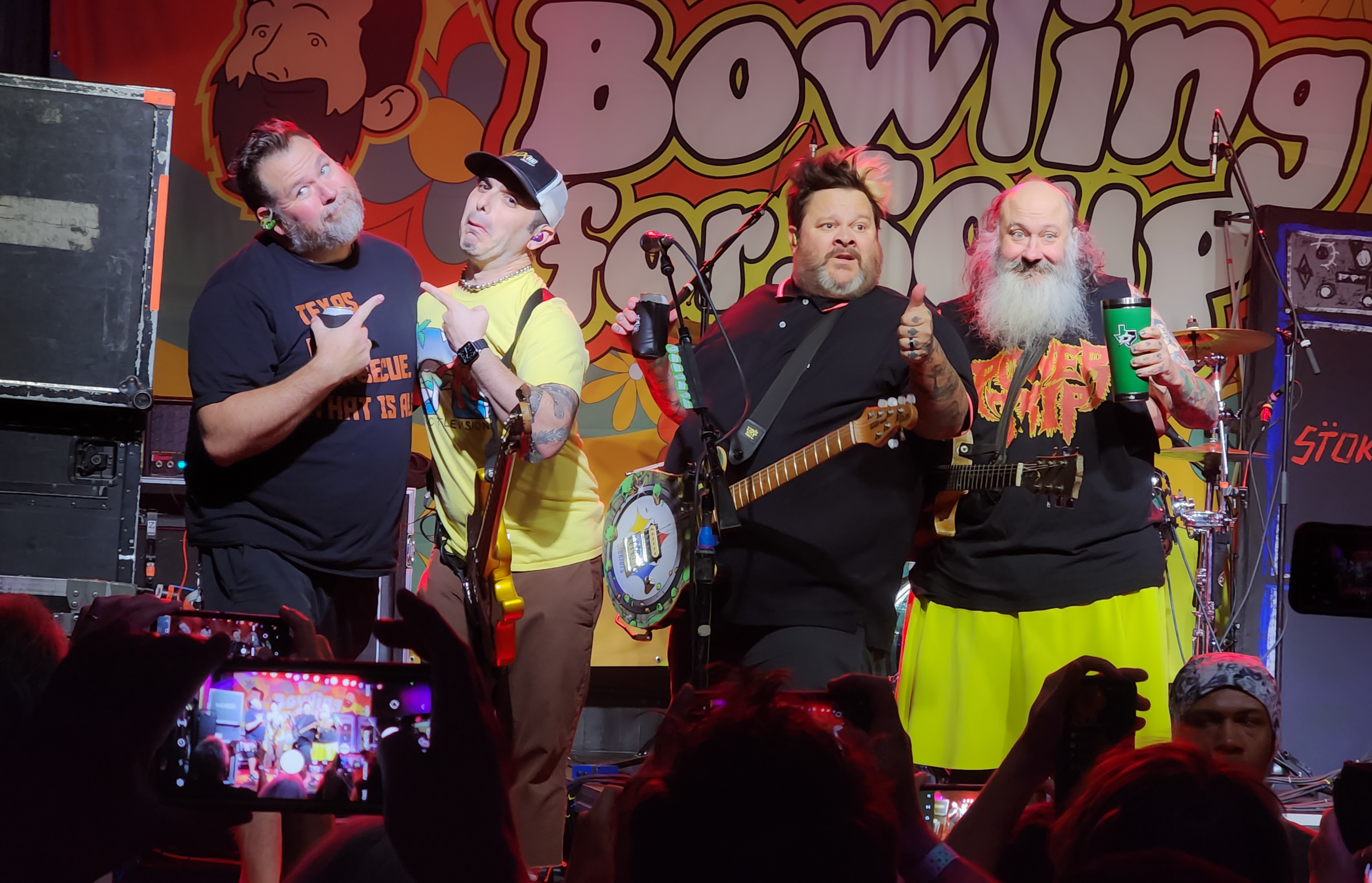
- Bowling for Soup performing at Saint Andrew's Hall in 2023. From left to right: Gary Wiseman, Rob Felicetti, Jaret Reddick, and Chris Burney

Background information
- Origin: Wichita Falls, Texas, U.S.
- Genres: Pop-punk; pop rock; alternative rock; power pop
- Works: Discography
- Years active: 1994–present
- Labels: Que-so; FFROE; Jive; Silvertone; Sony BMG; Zomba; RCA; Crappy; Brando; SBAM
- Members: Jaret Reddick; Gary Wiseman; Rob Felicetti
- Past members: Lance Morrill; Erik Chandler; Chris Burney
- Website: bowlingforsoup.com

Bowling for Soup (commonly abbreviated to BFS) is an American rock band formed in Wichita Falls, Texas, in 1994. The band consists of Jaret Reddick (lead vocals, guitar), Gary Wiseman (drums, percussion), and Rob Felicetti (bass, backing vocals, guitar). The band is best known for its singles "Girl All the Bad Guys Want", "1985", "Almost", "Punk Rock 101", and "High School Never Ends". The band is also known for performing the theme song for the Disney Channel animated series Phineas and Ferb. Following lead guitarist Chris Burney's retirement in 2025, Reddick is the sole remaining original member.

== History ==
=== Formation and early years (1994–1999) ===
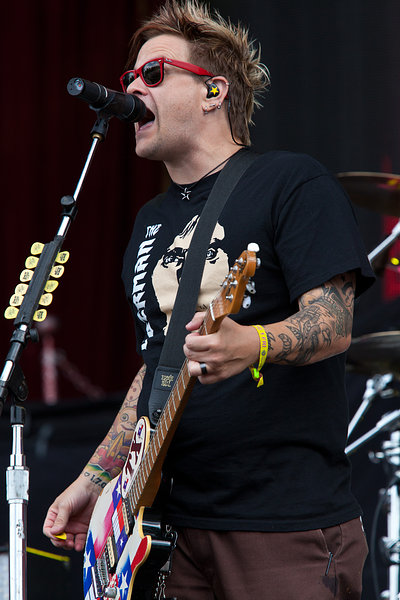
Jaret Reddick, vocalist for Bowling for Soup in 2010

Bowling for Soup has its origins in Wichita Falls, Texas, where Jaret Reddick and other members of the band grew up. Reddick and original drummer Lance Morrill met in the fall of 1976. Reddick began playing music in 1985, at 13 years old. Reddick and guitarist Chris Burney knew each other in high school (they met in 1986) and as students in the 1980s, they grew up on the popular heavy metal music of bands such as Quiet Riot, RATT, and Mötley Crüe, but were also influenced by the faster punk rock of the Ramones and later Green Day. Burney's family owned a Wichita Falls coffeehouse called "The Refuge" with a music stage and he played there with his first band, the Persecuted, where he and Reddick met bassist Erik Chandler and drummer Gary Wiseman in the early 1990s (although Wiseman did not join the band until 1998).

Burney and Chandler soon formed the Folkadots, while Wiseman formed Gary & the Wiseman. Burney and Chandler, along with Morrill, also formed the band Slaw. Around this time, Reddick formed the band Terminal Seasons. Not too long after, Reddick and Morrill formed coolfork! which Burney later joined. The band was in full swing by 1993, playing such venues as the Refuge. A few months later, after forming a band called Rubberneck, the group changed their name to Bowling for Soup, which was derived from the phrase "bowling for shit" from a comedy act by Steve Martin, and the band was officially formed in Wichita Falls on June 4, 1994, by Reddick (lead vocals, rhythm guitar), Burney (lead guitar, backing vocals), Chandler (bass, backing vocals, acoustic guitar), and Morrill (drums, percussion).

In 1996, Bowling for Soup relocated to Denton, Texas, and released a split album, Cell Mates, with Denton band The V.I.M.S that same year, and in 1998 released their second studio album (and third overall), Rock on Honorable Ones!! for the Denton music label FFROE. The group released its first EP, Tell Me When to Whoa, through FFROE later that year. The album sold over 10,000 copies, prompting Jive Records to sign the band. Morrill left the band on good terms and was replaced in July 1998 by Wiseman. As a side project, beginning around 1999, Reddick and Chandler performed acoustic shows at smaller venues and showcases, playing primarily Bowling for Soup songs in an acoustic fashion, billed as Jaret & Erik.

=== Let's Do It For Johnny!! and Drunk Enough To Dance (2000–2003) ===
Let's Do It for Johnny!!, Bowling for Soup's major label debut, was released on Jive in 2000. The album mostly contained re-recordings of the group's previous material along with a few new tracks and a cover of Bryan Adams' song "Summer of '69". Drunk Enough to Dance is Bowling for Soup's second album with Jive Records, released August 6, 2002. It was recorded at Tree Sound Studios and Sonica Recording in Atlanta and Big Time Audio in Dallas. One of the album's two singles, "Girl All The Bad Guys Want" (the other single was "Emily"), was nominated for a Grammy Award in 2003 in the "Best Pop Performance by a Duo or Group with Vocal" category. Reddick considers the Grammies one of his shining moments, not for the nomination, but for winning "worst dressed" from Joan Rivers.

A re-release in 2003 added "Punk Rock 101", a cover of the 1980s new wave band A Flock of Seagulls' "I Ran (So Far Away)", and "Star Song". An acoustic version of the song "Belgium" exists at the end of the album, as well as at the very end of the initial release. The cover of "I Ran (So Far Away)" was used as the opening theme song of the anime television show Saint Seiya: Knights of the Zodiac in North America.

The band appeared in the 2002 film Crossroads, playing at a graduation party. They also recorded a version of ...Baby One More Time which was featured on the 2003 Freaky Friday soundtrack.

=== A Hangover You Don't Deserve, Goes to the Movies and The Great Burrito Extortion Case (2004–2008) ===
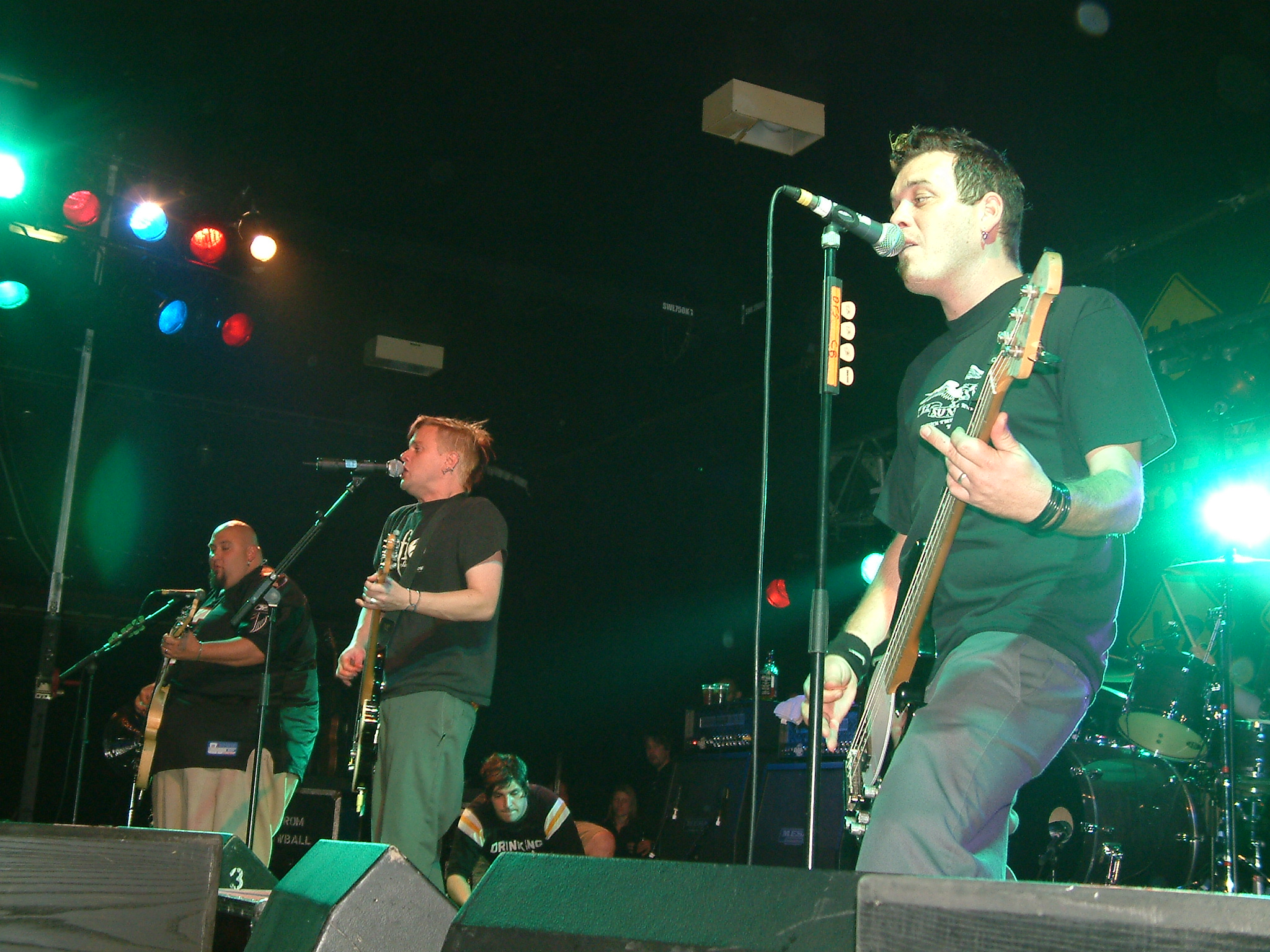
Bowling for Soup performs in Manchester, England

A Hangover You Don't Deserve was released on September 14, 2004, and has become the band's only Top 40 album. Sales of the album were driven in large part by the radio airplay of the single "1985", a song written by Mitch Allan of SR-71 and covered by Bowling For Soup with his permission. Bowling for Soup did make some modifications to the lyrics to better fit their style with Mitch Allan, lead vocalist of SR-71, contributed backing vocals to the song and appeared in the music video. "1985" became Bowling for Soup's biggest hit in the U.S., reaching No. 23 on the Billboard Hot 100. A second single from A Hangover You Don't Deserve, "Almost", charted on the UK Singles Chart, No. 46 on the U.S. Top 100, and No. 23 on U.S. Pop 100. "Ohio", better known as "Come Back to Texas", was released as a radio single in the U.S., but was not as popular as "1985" or "Almost", reaching only No. 59 on the U.S. Pop 100.

Bowling for Soup Goes to the Movies, a compilation album of cover songs and contributions to movie soundtracks, was released by the band in 2005. Later that year, Reddick and Burney made several appearances on VH1's I Love the '90s: Part Deux. Bowling for Soup appeared briefly at the start of the 2005 film Cursed, playing the song "Li'l Red Riding Hood". The group's cover version of Modern English's "I Melt With You" was used in the Disney movie Sky High and was on the movie's soundtrack album. A music video of the song was made, which aired on the Disney Channel and is included on the movie's DVD.

The group went on the Star 102.1 StarJam tour with Simple Plan in 2006 and were the opening act. They joined again the following year with Quietdrive and Army of Freshmen.

Bowling for Soup spent most of 2006 readying The Great Burrito Extortion Case, the group's seventh album, which was released on November 7, 2006. The group released the first single from that album, "High School Never Ends", to iTunes on September 19, 2006. The song did sell well at first, and Jive Records pulled promotion for it, releasing "When We Die" as a single. Online demand grew steadily for "High School Never Ends", prompting Reddick to express regret for not standing up for its initial release. He said the song has "a poetic quality... that everyone can relate to." The UK release of the album was on February 5, 2007.

In 2006, the band embarked on The Get Happy Tour, which was set up as a joint venture with alongside Army of Freshmen. The original tour was planned with Bowling for Soup headlining, Army of Freshmen opening and two other bands (Punchline and Lucky Boys Confusion) playing between. The tour kicked off in Austin, Texas on June 23, 2006, with the Vanished taking Lucky Boys Confusion's spot for the first three dates. The band toured the U.S. over the summer and autumn of 2006 with the Get Happy Tour and ended on August 27, 2006, in Amarillo, Tex. This was followed by a UK tour in early February 2007. Coinciding with this UK tour was the UK release of "High School Never Ends". The tour included Bowling for Soup as main headliners, Wheatus, Son of Dork and Army of Freshmen on the 12 date trek, which concluded at Hammersmith Palais in London, on the February 18.

The band released "I'm Gay" as the second UK single in early 2007. The release was on CD and 7" vinyl. A music video for the single was released in the UK, made up of live performances of the song from the "Get Happy Tour", of which the band had performed in the UK during February 2007. On September 25, 2007, it was announced on the official Bowling for Soup forums that "When We Die" would be released as a download only single in the UK on October 22, 2007, as the third single. Following this, the music video was added to the Kerrang television playlist and was played on Scuzz TV. The group created an album (also on the label Jive) called On Your Mark... Get Set... Smoke a Cigarette which consisted of three songs: "Bipolar", "Somebody Get My Mom", "Li'l Red Riding Hood".

Bowling for Soup confirmed during the Get Happy Tour that the group would be performing another tour of the UK in October 2007, called the Get Happy Tour 2, gracing the U.S. over the summer and featuring support acts Melee, Quietdrive, and Army of Freshmen. The UK tour bands were confirmed at the Download Festival (Army of Freshmen who played in the morning announced it first, and Bowling for Soup announced it later that afternoon), along with the lineup in Kerrang! on an advertisement poster for the new tour. The lineup consisted of Bowling for Soup, Bloodhound Gang, Zebrahead and Army of Freshmen.

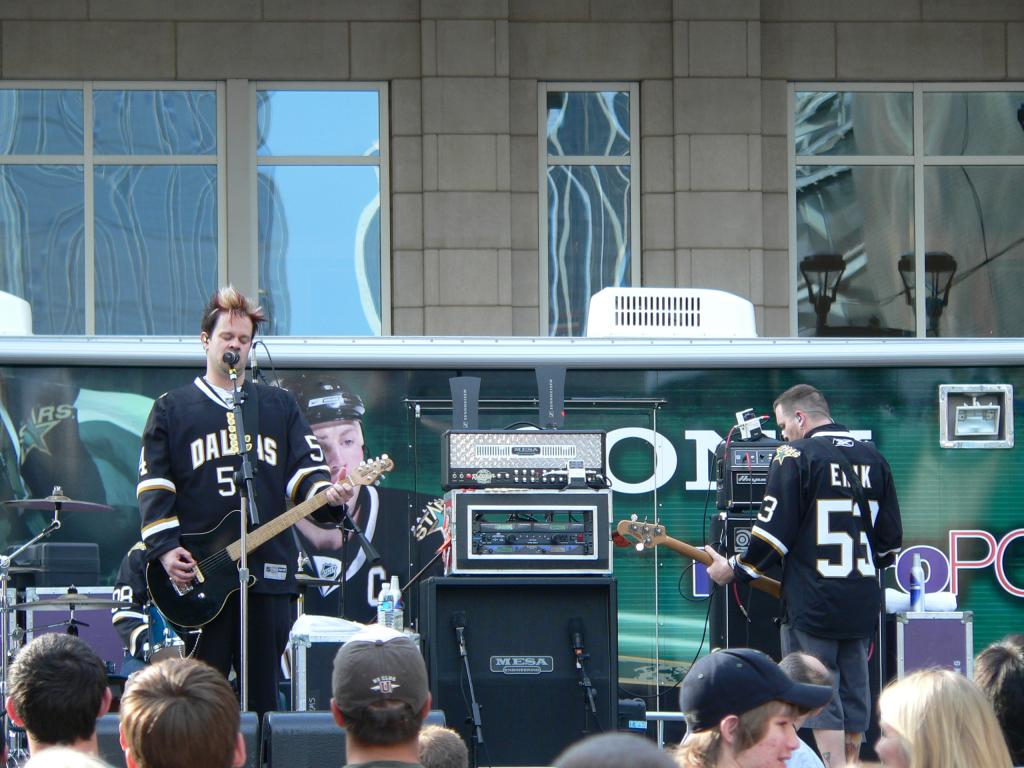
Bowling for Soup performing before the Dallas Stars' run in the 2008 Stanley Cup playoffs

Bowling for Soup produced an hour-long special that airs on DirecTV's concert series and made an appearance at the Download Festival at Donington Park, England. Bowling for Soup cowrote and sang the theme song for Disney's Phineas and Ferb, "Today Is Gonna Be A Great Day". The group briefly appears in one episode of Phineas and Ferb, called "Phineas and Ferb's Quantum Boogaloo". "Greatest Day" was the opening song to the Nickelodeon film The Last Day of Summer.

The band's first live DVD, Bowling for Soup: Live and Very Attractive was filmed over the course of the UK Get Happy Tour October 2007 and premiered at the AFI Dallas International Film Festival with the DVD released in the summer. A three-disk edition was released in the UK on July 7, 2008. There was a limited edition pre-order deal for the DVD which included a T-shirt, drinks mug, exclusive poster and more besides the DVD. Reddick sang lead vocals and Chandler sang backing vocals for the song "Endless Possibility" for the video game Sonic Unleashed, which released on November 18, 2008.

=== Sorry for Partyin' and departure from Jive (2009–2010) ===
On January 20, 2009, Reddick released a video onto the web via the band's Myspace page and both YouTube accounts about a new album by the group. According to him, the band's eighth full-length album was set to be released in September 2009, and the band had very recently started recording. He said it was to be titled Sorry for Partyin'. The video was the first of a few released during the recording process of the album.

Sorry for Partyin' was released on October 12, 2009. "My Wena" was the first promotional single from the album. The single was first previewed on May 5, 2009, on the Lex and Terry show. A music video for the song was filmed and the video was released on July 21, 2009. The song was released to iTunes on July 28, 2009. "No Hablo Ingles" was supposed to be the first single released to the radio for the album, however, Jive split with the band and shelved Sorry for Partyin' after only four weeks of being on sale, thus no single was ever released to radio.

To promote the release of the album, the band embarked on a headline tour of the UK in October 2009 under the title of The Party in Your Pants Tour. Main support on the tour came from Zebrahead, with additional support coming from MC Lars (who is signed to Reddick's Crappy Records) and the Leftovers. During the last show of this tour at the Camden Town Roundhouse in London Reddick announced to the crowd that Bowling for Soup would return to the UK in "The Spring" and will be hitting the European summer festival circuit and then again returning to the UK for another headlining tour in the Autumn. On Christmas Eve 2009, Bowling for Soup announced through the band's website, a UK Acoustic Tour in April 2010.

Bowling for Soup released Merry Flippin' Christmas Volume 1 digitally on November 26, 2009.

=== Fishin' for Woos and One Big Happy (2010–2012) ===
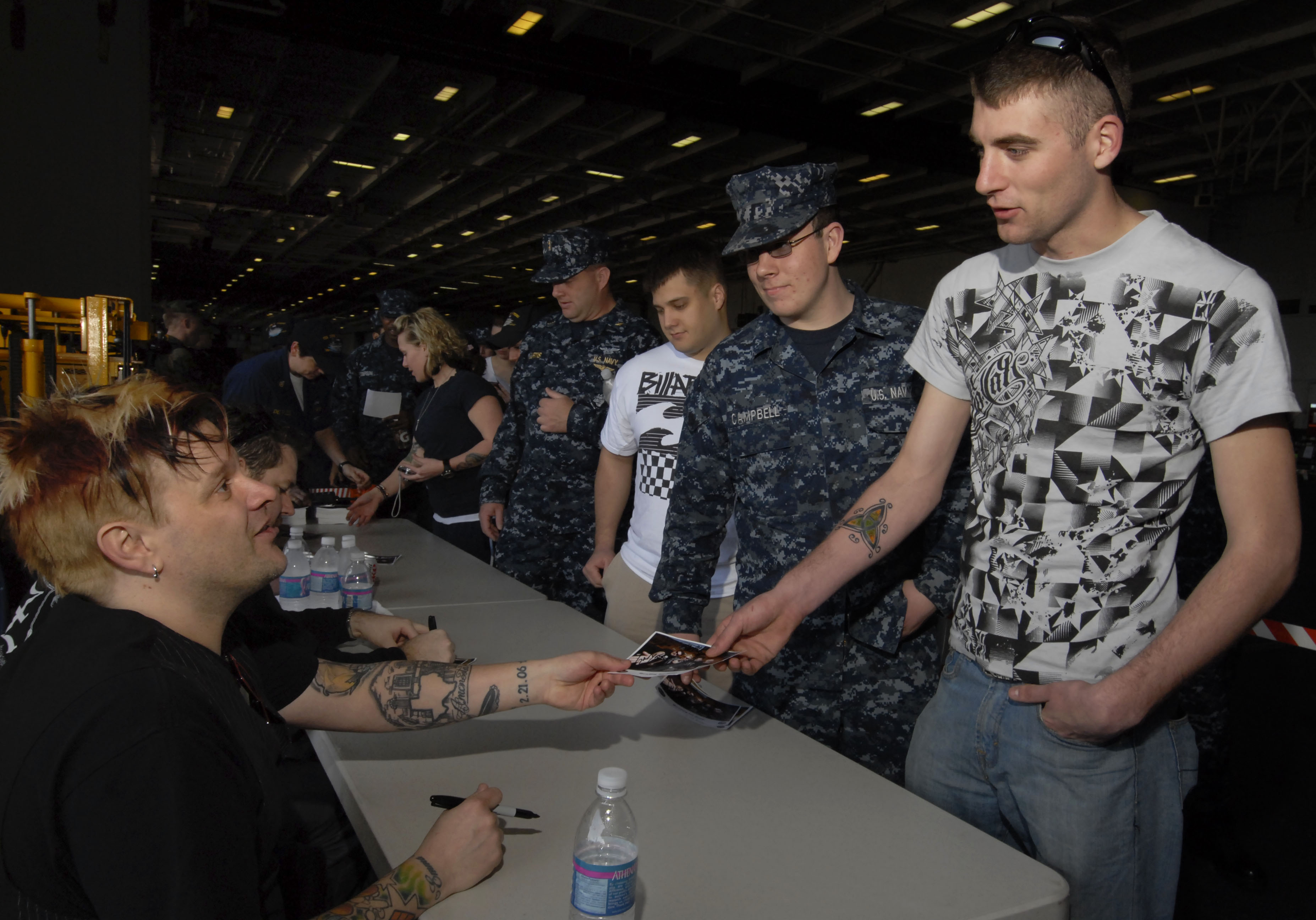
Members of Bowling for Soup signing autographs for sailors aboard the carrier USS John C. Stennis.

Bowling for Soup released an acoustic album, Jaret & Erik 2010 UK Acoustic Tour Limited Edition CD, during Reddick and Chandler's acoustic tour in the UK in April 2010. The album was released after the tour on the band's online UK and US stores. Reddick has also stated that an acoustic album is very possible for the group's next acoustic tour, which was planned for April 2011, but nothing came of it.

The band played at four US Navy Bases in 2011, three in Japan: Sasebo on July 2, Yokosuka on July 4 and Okinawa on July 13. Diego Garcia NSF in British Indian Ocean Territory was part of the Armed Forces Entertainment tour for the band, to help kick off July 4 Celebrations for the troops. The first three dates were part of the Independence Day Celebration. During February and March 2012 Reddick & Chandler also traveled to the Middle East and Africa to perform some acoustic shows at US Military bases throughout the region.

In an interview, Reddick said that after the band's current tour concluded he would begin writing material for a new record. Reddick confirmed May 8 on his Twitter account the band would start recording an eleventh album in June 2010. On June 2, an update was posted on the band's website stating that the group had entered the studio and begun recording the album. The band announced that a new album was to be released in Spring 2011. Merry Flippin' Christmas Volume 1 was released on iTunes and CD, the band's first two albums were re-released On January 5, 2011, Reddick announced the new album would be released on the Razor & Tie label, but, for unknown reasons, the band later left the label. Legacy Recordings released a greatest hits album, Playlist: The Very Best of Bowling for Soup, on January 25, 2011, as part of the label's Playlist music album series. The band played what is said to be the first single off Fishin' for Woos, "S-S-S-Saturday" (also known as "Saturday Night"), live on ABC for the Professional Bowlers Association Tournament of Champions finals on January 22. The album was ultimately released April 25, 2011, in the United Kingdom, and April 26 worldwide. In July 2011, the band released a 7" split EP with The Dollyrots, in which each band covered one of the other band's songs. Reddick said the band had plans to release a lot of other music in 2011: "We are re-releasing our first three albums and working on another Christmas album. Chandler will release a solo record. And my new band, People on Vacation, will release our first album. We are also trying to get a b-sides comp together. It is gonna be a great year!". In October 2011, Bowling for Soup released a three-track single "I've Never Done Anything Like This" for Fishin' for Woos that included the title song as well as a re-recorded version of "The Bitch Song" and a cover version of "Stacy's Mom" by Fountains of Wayne.

On September 8, the band performed at the Tennessee Soybean Festival in Martin, Tennessee. On September 25, 2012, the band released a split album with The Dollyrots and Patent Pending called One Big Happy!, where the bands perform covers of each other's songs. The three bands went on the tour of the same name that year.

=== Lunch. Drunk. Love. and Songs People Actually Liked – Vol. 1 (2013–2015) ===
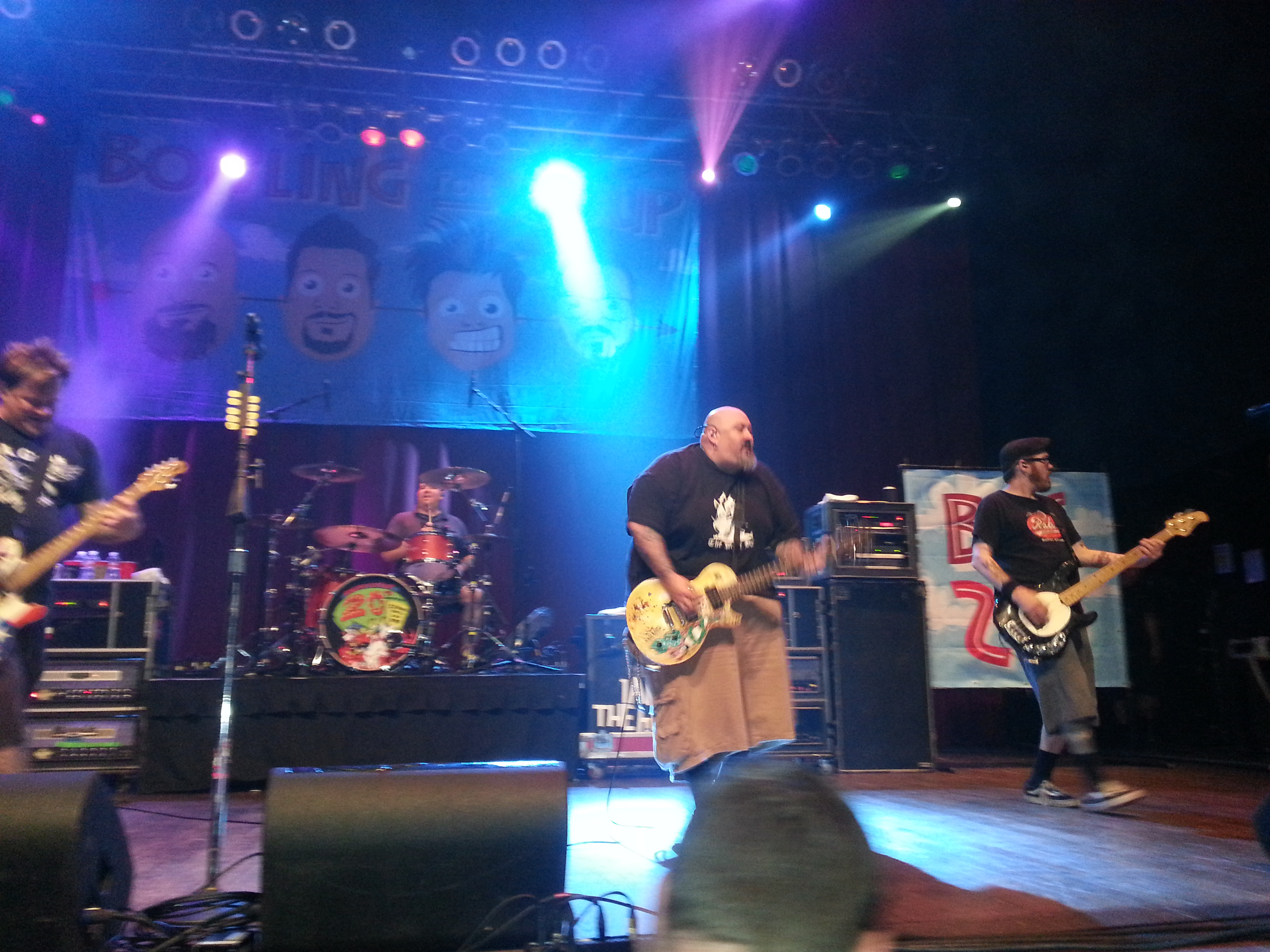
Bowling for Soup performing in 2013

On February 15, 2013, the band started a pledge music campaign to fund a new album, and Reddick stated: "The Writing Process has Begun". Pledgers got to hear the songs just as they were finished. The first song to be written was "Since We Broke Up", by Linus of Hollywood and Reddick. On April 8, 2013, Bowling for Soup announced that the group's last tour of the UK would take place in October of the same year, but they toured the UK again in February 2016, February 2018 and February 2020.

In an announcement video posted on the band's official YouTube account, Reddick announced that the annual 14-day UK tour would go ahead in October 2013, but that it would be the last UK tour the group perform as Bowling for Soup. Reddick cited personal and financial reasons for the decision, saying that: "The UK has given this band everything, so I'm being honest about our reasons. We still love being Bowling For Soup but touring really does begin to take its toll on both you and your family after a while." No Ireland dates were announced for the tour, which only featured one support act (Patent Pending) as opposed to two, with an extended Bowling for Soup setlist and exclusive acoustic concert for VIP ticket holders preceding the concert. The band also stressed that the group "are not splitting up", but at the current time, there are no plans for a farewell US tour. Reddick also announced in a video posted online that the band was scheduled to record a new cover album, as well as a greatest hits album after the 2013 Farewell UK Tour and preceding the band's 20th anniversary in June 2014.

On June 11, 2013, Reddick announced via the band's PledgeMusic Project page it was up to the pledgers to vote on what the newest album should be named. On June 20, 2013, it was announced the title with the most votes was Lunch. Drunk. Love. The album was released to the pledgers on September 6, 2013, in both clean and explicit formats and the pledge campaign was temporarily extended, allowing effective purchase of the album for $10.

As part of Bowling for Soup's 20th anniversary, Reddick, Burney, Chandler, and Wiseman decided to make a greatest hits album. The band once again turned to PledgeMusic to source funding for the project. The album is titled Songs People Actually Liked – Volume 1 and includes seventeen re-recorded songs and one new song. This album is seen by the band members as their true 'Greatest Hits' (from the group's first 10 years) as the previously released 2011 greatest hits album was released with no consultation from the band or fans. The album was released to PledgeMusic subscribers on November 19, 2014. One critic wrote, "Bowling for Soup's energetic, humorous music is just as good today as it was when it was released."

In 2015, Bowling for Soup appeared on Blues Traveler's album Blow Up the Moon, co-writing the songs "Right Here Waiting For You" and "I Know Right".

On June 15, 2015, Bowling for Soup announced a 15-day UK tour.

=== Drunk Dynasty and Chandler's departure (2016–2019) ===
The band announced on May 11, 2016, that they would begin to record a new EP, Drunk Dynasty. The band would again team up with PledgeMusic to include fans in the entire recording process. The band later announced that Drunk Dynasty was to be a full-length studio album. It was eventually released on October 14, 2016.

Beginning in September 2017, Reddick began performing solo acoustic shows, starting with the Heartache & Hilarity tour in the UK. That same month, the band announced that they would be returning to the UK the following February with a tour to celebrate the 15th anniversary of their seminal album Drunk Enough to Dance, accompanied by Get Happy Tour alumni Army of Freshmen (who celebrated their 20th anniversary as a band), and the Aquabats. The tour visited a number of large venues across the UK including O2 Apollo Manchester, University of East Anglia, culminating at London's O2 Brixton Academy. A few months later, in March 2018, the band toured South Africa for the first time.

On January 12, 2019, Reddick took to the band's official Facebook page to confirm fans' speculation that Chandler had left the band for personal reasons after not performing in some time. Chandler was replaced with long time friend, Rob Felicetti (Patent Pending/the Ataris). Later that year, in December 2019, the band released two volumes of "A Nice Night For An Evening", featuring piano covers of their most popular songs.

=== Pop Drunk Snot Bread (2020–2022) ===
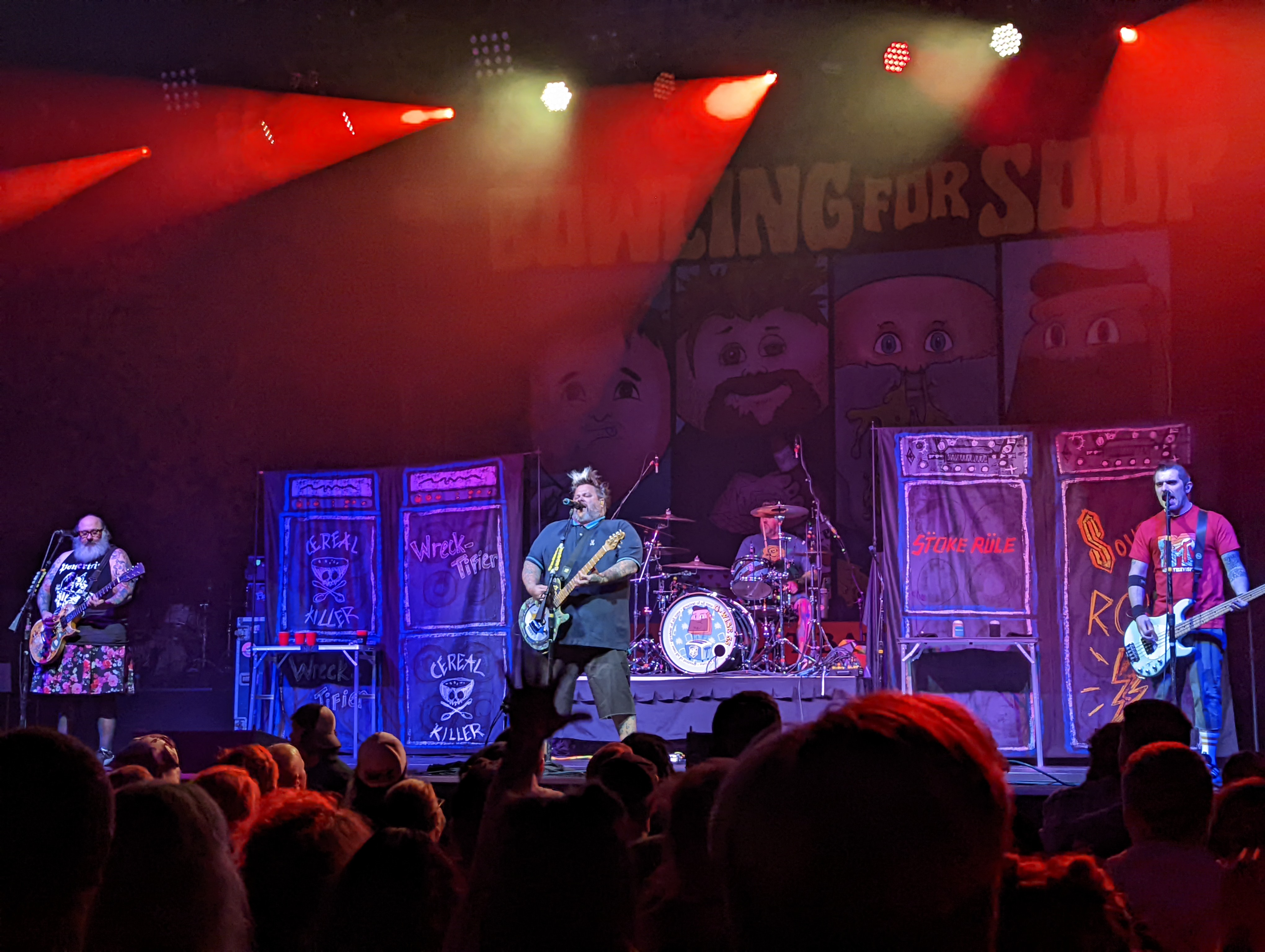
Bowling for Soup in Cincinnati, Ohio, during the "Back for the Attack" tour

In February 2020, Bowling For Soup headlined the "Together Again – You're Welcome" Tour in the UK, bringing along Simple Plan as direct support. This was the first tour the two bands had done together since 2003. The sold-out tour included the band's first time selling out London's famed O2 Brixton Academy. Around this same time, "Alexa Bliss", a single about WWE wrestler Alexa Bliss, was released. The music video stars her as herself. The song went viral on YouTube, garnering almost six million views as of 2023.

In October 2020, the band had planned and announced a "Surf the UK Tour" in 2021 with Lit and The Dollyrots, but they were forced to cancel due to the COVID-19 pandemic. The tour was rescheduled to begin in April 2022.

The band shared their new single "Getting Old Sucks (But Everybody's Doing It)" in May 2021. Later that year, in November, they released another song "Killin' 'Em With Kindness".

The single "I Wanna Be Brad Pitt" premiered on Tulsa's The Edge radio station on January 13, 2022. With the official release of the song on February 25, the band also revealed their eleventh album titled Pop Drunk Snot Bread, which was released on April 22, 2022.

During the "Surf The UK Tour" in April 2022, Wiseman dropped out of the tour after suffering a mysterious illness. The remainder of the tour was acoustic with full band songs thrown in, with members of The Dollyrots and Lit stepping in.

In March 2022, it was announced that Bowling for Soup was headlining a tour along with ska acts Less Than Jake and the Aquabats (for the first leg), with opening acts Don't Panic, Cliffdiver, Doll Skin, and Keep Flying. The tour began on June 22 in Norfolk and wrapped up on September 17 in St Louis.

=== Don't Mind if We Do and Songs People Actually Liked – Vol. 2 (2023–2024) ===
On February 14, 2023, the band announced a cover of the Miley Cyrus song "Flowers", which was released on February 21. Following that, Reddick announced on March 28 in a social media post that Don't Mind if We Do, a digital album of cover songs that the band had recorded during the COVID-19 pandemic, would be released soon. The album surprise dropped on April 4, featuring a cover of Patent Pending's "Hey Mario". In June, the band officially announced their second re-recorded greatest hits album Songs People Actually Liked – Volume 2, which dropped on August 25.

In May 2023, the band announced the "You Asked For It Tour", with which they would be headlining alongside Less Than Jake. The tour took place in the UK in February 2024, with the show in Cardiff being the biggest headline show of their career at the time.

On September 5, 2023, it was announced that the band signed to SBAM Records for their UK releases.

=== Burney's retirement and Warped Tour revival (2024–present) ===
On January 29, 2024, the first leg of the "Sick 50 Tour" was announced, which celebrates 30 years of the band and 20 years of A Hangover You Don't Deserve, which will be played in its entirety. The tour was later renamed to "A Hangover You Don't Deserve 20th Anniversary Tour". The North American leg was announced for three legs from June to October that year.

On June 13, 2024, Chris Burney was unable to join the band on stage at the Firenze Rocks Festival in Florence, Italy, and immediately went back home to Texas due to medical concerns. The band's performance in Florence marked the first time they performed as a three-piece, and without Burney. On June 16, the band performed at Download Festival, where they, alongside Brendan Brown of Wheatus, announced a UK leg of the "20 Years of A Hangover You Don't Deserve" tour for that February. On July 12, it was announced that Burney would be taking a break from performing with the band for health reasons. The band did not hire a substitute guitarist for the 20 Years of A Hangover You Don't Deserve tour and instead performed as a three-piece.

In September 2024, the band covered "Friend Like Me" for Disney's A Whole New Sound, a compilation album featuring pop-punk covers of songs from classic Disney films.

On January 22, 2025, it was announced that Burney would not be rejoining Bowling for Soup as he decided to officially retire due to medical developments, touring nonstop and "30 years of rocking balls". The band elaborated they would not be replacing him and would continue as a three-piece, stating "you cannot replace a legend". Two days later, on January 24, the band announced their biggest headline show at Wembley Arena.

On January 27, 2025, the band were among the first announced to be part of the 2025 Warped Tour. To coincide with the announcement, the band released a cover of Blink-182's "The Rock Show". Shortly after, the band announced via their Spotify page that a pop-punk covers album is in the works, as well as a live album for the Hangover You Don't Deserve 20th Anniversary tour.

The UK leg of "A Hangover You Don't Deserve 20th Anniversary Tour" took place in February 2025, with their performance at Motorpoint Arena Nottingham being the second biggest headline show they had played. On February 21, the band released Stoked on Trent, which was recorded live in the UK at an acoustic set in 2022. On February 25, it was announced the band were joining Simple Plan for their "Bigger Than You Think!" summer tour.

On April 25, 2025, a deluxe edition of Fishin' For Woos released, including the three bonus tracks and two new acoustic versions of "Here's Your Freakin' Song" and "Smiley Face (It's All Good)". On August 26, the band announced the live album A Hangover You Definitely Deserve, which released on October 24th. The album was recorded during the band's Manchester show in February.

=== Upcoming twelfth studio album (2025-present) ===
The band released the single "Holding On To That Hate" on September 30, 2025, being one of the first tracks recorded with the SSL Revival 4000, which has been described as the "latest leap forward in analog sound".

On November 8, 2025, the band released a cover of the Taylor Swift song "Actually Romantic". On November 17, to promote the Wembley show, the band re-recorded "Endless Possibility" with Punk Rock Factory and Wheatus, with the music video releasing exclusively through Rolling Stone that same day. Bowling for Soup's headline show at OVO Wembley took place on 13 December 2025, marking the band's biggest headline show of their career to date.

In February 2026, the band was announced as part of the lineup for the Louder Than Life music festival in Louisville, scheduled to take place in September. On March 3, the band released a cover of the Simple Plan track, "I'm Just a Kid", ahead of the second part of the "Bigger Than You Think!" tour. The band described the cover as "our love letter to a band and a song that means the world to us" on their social media pages. On April 21, the band dropped a cover of Sum 41's "In Too Deep". From May to July 2026, the band embarked on the "Bowl My Bones Tour" in Australia and the UK, co-headlining alongside Frank Turner.

== Musical style and influences ==
Bowling for Soup's musical style has been described as pop-punk, pop rock, alternative rock, and power pop. AllMusic describes Bowling for Soup's style as a "feverishly catchy and humorous blend of power pop, ska, punk, and hardcore," further characterizing it as a "cheeky take on pop-punk and melodic alt-pop." Bowling for Soup's influences include Green Day, Bad Religion, Ramones, NOFX, Descendents, Elvis Costello, and Willie Nelson.

Ultimate Guitar senior editor David Slavković named Bowling for Soup the fifteenth "weirdest band name of all time," highlighting a quote from one of the site's users who asked: "Are they bowling to obtain soup, or are they bowling in the name of soup?"

== Tours ==
Headlining

- US tour (1998)
- UK tour (2002)
- Overweight... Over Dressed... And Over Here! (2003)
- A Hangover You Don't Deserve tour (2004-2006)
- US tour (2005)
- The Get Happy Tour (2006-2007, 2018)
- Party In Your Pants Tour (2009)
- Sorry For Partyin' Tour (2010)
- You Just Can't Get Rid Of Us (2010)
- Fishin' For Woos tour (2011)
- One Big Happy Tour (2012)
- Bid UK Farewell tour (2013)
- Bowling For Soup Is Finally Legal Tour! (2015)
- How About Another Round tour (2016)
- Drunk Dynasty tour (2017)
- South Africa tour (2018)
- Almost Christmas tour (2018)
- Crowd Surf The UK tour (2022)
- The Getting Old Sucks tour (2023)
- A Hangover You Don't Deserve 20th Anniversary tour (2024-2025)
- Warped Or Bust (2025)
- Hey! Let's Be Friends... tour (2026)

Co-headlining

- Reel Big Fish + Bowling For Soup (with Reel Big Fish) (2019)
- Good Vibes & High Fives Tour (with Less Than Jake) (2019)
- Together Again! You're Welcome (with Simple Plan) (2020)
- Back For The Attack (with The Aquabats and Less Than Jake) (2022)
- Lovin' The Sun (with Lit) (2024)
- You Asked For It tour (with Less Than Jake and Vandoliers) (2024)
- Bowling For Bones (with Frank Turner & The Sleeping Souls) (2026)

Traveling festival

- Vans Warped Tour (2003, 2004, 2013, 2014, 2017, 2018, 2019, 2025)
- Good Things (2024)

Opening act

- UK tour (for Spunge) (2002)
- Star 102.1 StarJam tour (for Simple Plan) (2006)
- UK tour (for Steel Panther) (2016)
- Bigger Than You Think! (for Simple Plan) (2025, 2026)

== Associations ==
Bowling for Soup's hit song "1985" was originally written by SR-71's Mitch Allan. According to Reddick, Allan showed the song to him and instructed him to take it as his own, as it seemed more of a Bowling for Soup song than an SR-71 song. Bowling for Soup worked closely with the alternative band Army of Freshmen. In the video for "High School Never Ends" the boy clapping can be seen wearing an Army of Freshmen T-shirt, and Army of Freshmen themselves can be seen as part of the BFS Marching Band. Reddick does guest vocals on four tracks on Army of Freshmen's album Under the Radar.

In 2003, fellow Texan punk rockers Junior opened for Bowling for Soup when the group played the club Trees in Deep Ellum. Reddick later co-wrote the song "She's So Amazing" for the band's album Are We Famous Yet?, and lends vocals as well. The Irish pop rock singer Lesley Roy lend her vocals for Bowling for Soup's song "Much More Beautiful Person" from the album The Great Burrito Extortion Case. Both Roy and Bowling for Soup were assigned to the same record label. Reddick is friends with MC Lars, and has lent his vocals for MC Lars' single "Download This Song". MC Lars was a part of Reddick's label Crappy Records. In 2009, Bowling for Soup cameoed in the music video "Telephone Operator" by the Leftovers, who were also a part of Crappy Records.

In 2001, Bowling for Soup performed the theme song for the Nickelodeon film Jimmy Neutron: Boy Genius. The group's version of the theme was based on the previously written television series theme song written by Brian Causey of Man Or Astro-man?. Also in 2001, Reddick wrote the lyrics for "Greatest Day" for the film Max Keeble's Big Move while the band did the music. Bowling for Soup also performed the theme "Today is Gonna Be a Great Day" for the Disney Channel cartoon Phineas and Ferb, Reddick stars in the episode "Dude, We're Getting the Band Back Together" where he is the lead vocalist of a fictional band called "Love Händel". The band itself also appeared in animated form in the episode "Phineas and Ferb's Quantum Boogaloo" in which the band performed an alternate version of the show's theme with Phineas and Ferb for their futuristic nephews. On Cartoon Network, Reddick and Chandler both played an acoustic show in 2006. And in August 2008 Reddick and Chandler filmed an exclusive video for Total Guitar magazine in the UK called "How To Write A Song In 5 Minutes". In 2008, Reddick teamed up with SEGA to work on the theme song for Sonic Unleashed, titled "Endless Possibility".

New Zealand band 48May ran into legal issues and decided to take the song "Leather and Tattoos" off of the group's debut album, due to the melody sounding very similar to "Punk Rock 101". The album was replaced with a "tour edition" of the CD with the questionable song missing.

In 2006, Bowling for Soup covered Fergie's "London Bridge" for Pepsi Smash Cover Art on Yahoo! videos.

In 2008, Reddick co-arranged co-wrote and produced the singles "SUV" and "Girls + Summer = Fun!" with solo artist Christy Darlington, and Erik Chandler and Gary Wiseman performed on the recordings as well. These songs were subsequently released digitally. This collaboration resulted from Bowling for Soup and Darlington having performed concerts together and knowing each other since the late 1990s in the Dallas music scene and mutual respect and appreciation for each other's music.

In 2014, Bowling for Soup covered the Green Day song "St. Jimmy" for the album Kerrang! Does Green Day's American Idiot.

=== Greenmount (2017) ===
Lead vocalist Reddick provided vocals on the Lakesick track "Greenmount" as the theme song for the stoner adventure comedy of the same name. Greenmount stars Shane Kippel (star of Degrassi: The Next Generation) alongside creator Joshua Prior (who also fronts Lakesick), and John Donahue. Greenmount was released in June 2019.

== Music videos ==
It became a running gag in Bowling for Soup's music videos to feature previous songs of the band as an introduction for the video. This can be seen in "Girl All the Bad Guys Want", "Emily", and "High School Never Ends", which feature music from "The Bitch Song", "Girl All the Bad Guys Want", and "1985" respectively.

== Band members ==
Current members

- Jaret Reddick – lead vocals, rhythm guitar (1994–present), lead guitar (2025–present, live only)
- Gary Wiseman – drums, percussion, occasional backing vocals (1998–present)
- Rob Felicetti – bass, backing vocals, acoustic guitar (2018–present), drums, percussion (2011, 2012, 2017, 2022; touring), lead guitar (2013, touring; 2021–present, studio only)

Former members

- Lance Morrill – drums, percussion, occasional backing vocals (1994–1998; touring guest 2009, 2014, 2019)
- Erik Chandler – bass, backing and occasional lead vocals, acoustic guitar (1994–2019)
- Chris Burney – lead guitar, backing vocals (1994–2025)

Former touring musicians

- Kelly Ogden – bass, backing vocals (2012; substitute for Erik Chandler, 2022); vocals (2010, 2012, 2015, 2016, 2018; touring guest)
- Taylor Carroll – drums, percussion (2022; substitute for Gary Wiseman)
- Kevin Baldes – bass, backing vocals (2022; substitute for Rob Felicetti)

== Discography ==
- Bowling for Soup (1994)
- Rock on Honorable Ones!! (1998)
- Let's Do It for Johnny!! (2000)
- Drunk Enough to Dance (2002)
- A Hangover You Don't Deserve (2004)
- The Great Burrito Extortion Case (2006)
- Sorry for Partyin' (2009)
- Fishin' for Woos (2011)
- Lunch. Drunk. Love. (2013)
- Drunk Dynasty (2016)
- Pop Drunk Snot Bread (2022)
