= Cell Mates (album) =

Studio album by The V.I.M.S / Bowling for Soup
- Released: February 1996
- Genre: Pop-punk
- Length: 29:58
- Label: Que-so

Bowling for Soup chronology
Bowling for Soup (1994)	Cell Mates (1996)	Rock on Honorable Ones!! (1998)

Cell Mates is a split album by Bowling for Soup on their own Que-so Records with fellow Denton-based artists The V.I.M.S. Only 2,100 copies of the album were released and the album is currently out of print. Bowling for Soup frontman Jaret Reddick considers this album to be the band's second studio album. The band released digitally remastered versions of Bowling for Soup, Cell Mates, and Tell Me When to Whoa through iTunes and Amazon.com in October 2011. "I Don't Know", "Cody", "Kool-Aid" and "Assman" were re-recorded for release on Rock on Honorable Ones!!.

== Track listing ==
No.	Title	Writer(s)	Artist(s)	Length
1.	"King Bong"	The V.I.M.S	The V.I.M.S	1:54
2.	"I Hate McDonald's"	The V.I.M.S	The V.I.M.S	2:02
3.	"I Don't Know"	Chris Kruse, Justin James	The V.I.M.S	2:19
4.	"Navy Sex Offender"	The V.I.M.S	The V.I.M.S	2:40
5.	"Cody"	Reddick, Burney, Chandler, Cody Garcia	Bowling for Soup	4:01
6.	"Kool-Aid"	Reddick	Bowling for Soup	3:11
7.	"Assman"	Reddick	Bowling for Soup	3:29
8.	"Girl You Want (Just a Girl)" (Devo cover)	Gerald Casale, Mark Mothersbaugh	The V.I.M.S	2:25
9.	"Nathaniel"	The V.I.M.S	The V.I.M.S	2:30
10.	"Suspicious Minds" (Mark James cover)	Mark James	Bowling for Soup	2:20
11.	"Wisk"	Reddick	Bowling for Soup	3:05
Total length:				29:58

== Personnel ==
The V.I.M.S.

- Robert Hamilton — drums, backing vocals
- Justin James — guitar, backing vocals
- Chris Kruse — lead vocals, guitar
- Nicholas Yovich — bass

Bowling for Soup

- Chris Burney — guitars, backing vocals
- Erik Chandler — bass, backing vocals
- Lance Morrill — drums, backing vocals
- Jaret Reddick — lead vocals, guitars
