= Bowling for Soup (album) =

Studio album by Bowling for Soup
- Released: September 1994
- Recorded: Summer 1994
- Genre: Punk rock; pop-punk
- Length: 53:42
- Label: Que-so
- Producer: James Chavez; Bowling for Soup

Bowling for Soup chronology
Bowling for Soup (1994)	Cell Mates (1996)

Bowling for Soup, is the debut studio album by American rock band Bowling for Soup. The album was recorded at C & L Studios in Summer 1994, and was released the following September on the band's own self-formed record label Que-so Records. This release was limited to 3,000 copies. The band released digitally remastered versions of Bowling for Soup, Cell Mates, and Tell Me When to Whoa through iTunes and Amazon.com in October 2011.

== Track listing ==
No.	Title	Length
1.	"Thirteen"	3:04
2.	"Shark"	5:01
3.	"Crayon"	3:10
4.	"Swim"	3:28
5.	"Nebraska"	3:37
6.	"Sandwich"	3:45
7.	"Sofa"	2:54
8.	"Pesticide"	2:37
9.	"Slurpee"	3:08
10.	"Hit"	4:22
11.	"Psycho"	3:35
12.	"Monopoly"	3:46
13.	"London"	6:14
14.	"Brooklyn Bridge"	1:34
15.	"Oliver"	3:26
Total length:		53:42

=== Video for "Thirteen" ===
The video of "Thirteen" shows the band playing the song in different places. Lance Morrill appears. Erik Chandler and Jaret Reddick had long hair, and Chris Burney had hair.

== Personnel ==
Bowling for Soup:

- Chris Burney — guitars, backing vocals
- Erik Chandler — vocals, bass, backing vocals
- Lance Morrill — drums, backing vocals
- Jaret Reddick — vocals, guitar, backing vocals

Production

- Produced by James Chavez and BFS
- Mixed by James Chavez and Jaret Reddick
- Mastered at Outback Studios, Wichita Falls, TX by Chris and Johnny Devine
- Photography by Wayne Wagner and Cody Garcia
- Manufactured and printed by Disc Makers, New Jersey, U.S.A.
