= Lunch. Drunk. Love. =

Studio album by Bowling for Soup
- Released: September 10, 2013
- Recorded: Panhandle House Studios; Denton, Texas; The Daycare; Highland Village, Texas; The Tackle Box; Hollywood, California
- Genre: Pop-punk
- Length: 41:40
- Labels: Brando; Que-so; RED
- Producers: Jarinus (Linus of Hollywood & Jaret Reddick)

Bowling for Soup chronology
Bowling for Soup Presents: One Big Happy! (2012)	Lunch. Drunk. Love. (2013)	Songs People Actually Liked – Volume 1 (2015)

Bowling for Soup studio chronology
Bowling for Soup Presents: One Big Happy! (2011)	Lunch. Drunk. Love. (2013)	Drunk Dynasty (2016)

Singles from Lunch. Drunk. Love.
- 1. "Real" Released: August 29, 2013; 2. "Right About Now" Released: August 30, 2013; 3. "From The Rooftops" Released: September 5, 2013; 4. "Envy" Released: September 9, 2013

Professional ratings
Review scores
Source	Rating
AllMusic	3/5 stars

Lunch. Drunk. Love. is the ninth studio album by the American rock band Bowling for Soup, released on September 10, 2013, through Brando and Que-so Records. The album was completely fan-funded, as well as being released on the band's own record label like their previous album. The band has released music videos for the songs "Real", "Right About Now", "Envy" and "Circle". "Circle" is also the first single off this record. The album charted at number 142 on the Billboard 200.

== Background and production ==
In an interview with Distorted Sound, Reddick stated "'Lunch. Drunk. Love.' people refer to as my divorce record and it was pretty angry, and there’s just a lot of emotions on there that you’re not used to hearing from Bowling For Soup."

Greetings!!

In just a few days, I will begin the process of writing songs for the next Bowling for Soup album. Then, this spring, we will hunker down in downtown Denton, Texas and start recording!!! You, our fans, have supported us so much for almost 19 years!!! So for this record, we are changing it up a bit.

We want you guys to be right with us the whole time. Literally!!!

That’s what happens HERE!

By pledging, you’ll get the album the second it’s done. And along the way, you’ll be able to access exclusive updates as I am writing songs. We will check in during rehearsals, updates from the studio while we lay it all down…and show you album art and even share with you plans for videos before we shoot them…Then we will do exclusive updates from video shoots and photo shoots and much, much more! By pledging, you will also get the chance to vote on the title of the album itself!!! How cool is that?!?!

Seriously, who is stoked??

Just $10 gets you a download of the new album as soon as it is done plus the exclusive updates!!

Just $15 gets you that download, plus the new album on cd, PLUS an exclusive acoustic CD that is only available RIGHT here to our pledgers…Two albums for $15 bucks!! We have gone mental!!!

Have a look to the right —> and see all the other stuff we’ve listed that can be yours. There is everything from pieces of BFS history, to exclusive T-shirts and posters, vintage back stage passes, house concerts and much much more!!

Remember, you only HAVE to pledge for the $10 download to get the Exclusive content…And the REALLY cool thing about PledgeMusic, is if you decide you want to add something else later, you can!!!

We want to bring this music directly to you and are so excited that we can finally do that here with PledgeMusic and you are LITERALLY going to be along for the entire ride…And when the album is done…You get that sucker right away!!!

And not only are you helping to make this new album come to life, but we will all be helping out an incredible organization called Sweet Relief Musicians Fund, who do amazing work in helping career musicians during times of illness, disability, or age related problems. 5% of EVERY pledge, even after we meet our goal, will go to them.

Well, that is about it…I need to get to writing, and you need to get to watching this all come together!!

Let’s do this!

I love you all!

Jaret

500 pledges were received within 48 hours, and in less than 7 days, Reddick announced "Dude, you guys killed it...In less than 7 days, you guys made this all happen!!! Could not be happier, and more excited..." As the goal was reached Reddick gave pledgers a video of an early acoustic version of the song "Since We Broke Up". Chandler finished recording bass on May 10, 2013. It was announced on day 10 in the recording studio that the drums were done. Tracking and recording at the Daycare was officially wrapped up in May, and the songs would be sent to mixing. On June 11, 2013, pledgers received an update regarding the album's title and that they would get to vote on what the album should be named. The band released the official title and cover for the new album on June 20, and the album was sent to be mastered on July 15. More artwork was released in August along with lyric videos for "Envy", "Rooftops", "Real", and "Right About Now", as well as videos for "I am Waking Up Today", "Since We Broke Up", and Circle" releasing throughout September. The campaign closed on September 4, 2013, with attaining 3579 pledges and a finished goal of 249%.

== Track listing ==
No.	Title	Writer(s)	Length
1.	"Critically Disdained"	Jaret Reddick	2:39
2.	"Since We Broke Up"	Reddick, Linus of Hollywood	3:42
3.	"Real"	Reddick, Linus of Hollywood	4:03
4.	"From the Rooftops"	Reddick, Ryan Hamilton	3:01
5.	"Circle" (Edie Brickell & New Bohemians cover)	Brandon Aly, Edie Arlisa Brickell, John Walter Bush, John Bradley Houser, Kennteh Neil Withrow	2:55
6.	"Normal Chicks"	Reddick, Linus of Hollywood	3:15
7.	"I Am Waking Up Today"	Reddick, Linus of Hollywood	2:49
8.	"Couple of Days"	Reddick	2:36
9.	"And I Think You Like Me Too"	Reddick, Linus of Hollywood	3:07
10.	"Envy"	Reddick, Linus of Hollywood	3:25
11.	"How Far This Can Go"	Reddick, Linus of Hollywood	3:58
12.	"Right About Now"	Reddick	2:40
13.	"Kevin Weaver"	Reddick	3:37
Total length:			41:40

=== B-sides ===
No.	Title	Length
1.	"Award Show Taylor Swift" (released to backers of the band's PledgeMusic campaign)	3:32

== Personnel ==
=== Bowling for Soup ===
- Jaret Reddick — lead vocals, rhythm guitar
- Erik Chandler — bass guitar, vocals
- Chris Burney — lead guitar, vocals
- Gary Wiseman — drums

=== Production ===
- Jarinus (Linus of Hollywood & Jaret Reddick) – producers
- Erik Herbst and Linus of Hollywood – engineering
- Jay Ruston at TRS West, Sherman Oaks, CA – mixing
- James Ingram and Jared Scott – additional mix engineers
- Spike – assisting
- Paul Logus at Taloowa – mastering

Additional musicians

- Linus of Hollywood
- Scott Simons
- Peter Adams
- Vincent Tyler
- Linda Stephens

== Charts ==
Chart (2013)	Peak position
UK Albums (Official Charts)	100
UK Album Downloads (Official Charts)	98
UK Independent Albums (Official Charts)	24
UK Rock & Metal Albums (Official Charts)	12
US Billboard 200	142
US Independent Albums (Billboard)	28
US Top Rock Albums (Billboard)	43
