= Rock on Honorable Ones!! =

Rock On Honorable Ones!!

Studio album by Bowling for Soup
- Released: January 1998; May 3, 2005 (re-release)
- Recorded: June–October 1997
- Studio: Reeltime Audio (Denton, Texas)
- Genre: Pop-punk; ska punk
- Length: 58:11
- Label: FFROE; Jive/Zomba (re-release)
- Producer: Eric Delegard; Jaret Reddick

Bowling for Soup chronology
Cell Mates (1996)	Rock On Honorable Ones!! (1998)	Tell Me When to Whoa (1998)

Singles from Rock On Honorable Ones!!
- 1. "Scope" Released: 1998; 2. "Cody" Released: 1998; 3. "2113" Released: 1997

Professional ratings
Review scores
Source	Rating
AllMusic	3/5 stars

Rock On Honorable Ones!! is the second studio album by American rock band Bowling for Soup. The title is a reference to the slogan of S.H. Rider High School in Wichita Falls, Texas, where Bowling for Soup hails from. Based on the practice of Permian High School in Odessa, Texas (subject of Friday Night Lights), which is nicknamed "MOJO", Rider High adopted the slogan "ROHO" in the 1960s. Rider's sports teams are called the "Raiders", and Rider students are informed that "ROHO" stands for "Ride on Honorable Ones". This is the only Bowling for Soup album to include a horn section.

== Production and recording ==
In the summer of 1996, the band announced in a newsletter that they were "busy recording tracks for their third CD and were shooting for a spring '97 release". They recorded 24 songs and were in the process of selecting 15 or 16 of the best tunes to put on the new album.

In the next newsletter, they decided to abandon all 24 songs and redo all the songs in a Denton, Texas studio in May. They decided to do this because "we are releasing this CD ourselves, so we wanted to release the burden of having to do all of the production ourselves. Also, we wanted to bring in some fresh ears for the production process. So hopefully we should have a full independent release completed by the end of this summer!"

In a third newsletter from the band, they announced that the new album will be called Rock On Honorable Ones. "As a lot of you may already know, BFS is all about "rocking", and 3/4ths of us went to S.H. Rider High (ROHO), thus, the album is appropriately named. The new CD has 14 new rock songs and, lo and behold, 5 of the songs feature the bestest 4-piece horn section on the planet."

The band signed to FFROE Records and recorded at Reeltime Audio, headed by Jeff Roe which was based in Denton, Texas. The band would promote the album by playing months of shows while still in the recording process and upon its release a 4 week west coast tour in spring.

By August 1998, "Scope" and "2113" were receiving local air play from the college and some commercial markets and the band announced they were currently in process of recording the EP Tell Me When to Whoa.

== Track listing ==
No.	Title	Writer(s)	Length
1.	"2113"	Jaret Reddick, Erik Chandler	4:49
2.	"Scope"	Reddick	3:38
3.	"Valentino"	Reddick	3:29
4.	"Corndog"	Reddick	4:14
5.	"Cody"	Reddick, Chris Burney, Chandler, Cody Garcia	4:20
6.	"Belgium"	Reddick, Chandler	3:35
7.	"Milo"	Reddick	3:46
8.	"Captain Hook"	Reddick	3:45
9.	"Ack!!"	Reddick	3:40
10.	"Thespian"	Reddick, Chandler	4:37
11.	"Kool-Aid"	Reddick	3:40
12.	"I Don't Know"	Brian Kruse, Reddick, Burney, Chandler	2:26
13.	"Wisk"	Reddick	3:21
14.	"Assman"	Reddick	3:53
15.	"Friday"	Reddick	4:51
Total length:			58:11

=== Video for "Cody" ===
The song "Cody" has a video, in which the band plays the song, sharing the life with a man, while some live scenes appear.

The video features Lance Morrill, who was seldom seen when he was a part of the band. Jaret Reddick had long hair when the video was filmed, and this is also reflected in the cover of the album.

== Personnel ==
Bowling for Soup:

- Jaret Reddick — lead vocals, rhythm guitar
- Chris Burney — lead guitar, backing vocals
- Erik Chandler — bass guitar, backing vocals
- Lance Morrill — drums, backing vocals
