= Emily (Bowling for Soup song) =

2002 single by Bowling for Soup

Single by Bowling for Soup

from the album Drunk Enough to Dance
- B-side: "Change My Mind"; "Captain Hook"
- Released: November 4, 2002
- Studio: Tree (Atlanta, Georgia)
- Length: 3:30
- Label: Jive; Silvertone; FFROE; Zomba
- Songwriter(s): Jaret Reddick
- Producer(s): Butch Walker

Bowling for Soup singles chronology
"Girl All the Bad Guys Want" (2002)	"Emily" (2002)	"Punk Rock 101" (2003)

"Emily" is a single by American pop-punk band Bowling for Soup. It appears on their fourth studio album, Drunk Enough to Dance (2002), as the second track on the album. The song was released as the second single from the album on November 4, 2002, and reached number 67 on the UK Singles Chart. Like most singles by Bowling for Soup, it was written by lead singer Jaret Reddick.

== Music video ==
The music video features the band members in a bar trying to find alternative ways to use the toilet. During the music video, they are seen playing in a bathroom.

== Track listing ==
1. "Emily"
2. "Change My Mind"
3. "Captain Hook"

== Charts ==
Chart (2002)	Peak position
Scotland (OCC)	75
UK Singles (OCC)	67
UK Indie (OCC)	7
UK Rock & Metal (OCC)	8
