= Girl All the Bad Guys Want =

2002 single by Bowling for Soup

- Standard artwork

Single by Bowling for Soup

from the album Drunk Enough to Dance
- Released: July 15, 2002
- Studio: Tree (Atlanta, Georgia)
- Genre: Pop-punk
- Length: 3:17
- Label: Jive; Silvertone
- Songwriters: Jaret Reddick; Butch Walker
- Producer: Butch Walker

Bowling for Soup singles chronology
"Jimmy Neutron Theme" (2001)	"Girl All the Bad Guys Want" (2002)	"Emily" (2002)

Alternative cover
- UK CD2 artwork

"Girl All the Bad Guys Want" is a single by American pop-punk band Bowling for Soup, from their 2002 album, Drunk Enough to Dance. The song was written by Butch Walker (formerly of Marvelous 3), who has also written songs for Avril Lavigne and SR-71. Released on July 15, 2002, the song reached number eight on the UK Singles Chart, number 15 in Ireland, and number 64 on the US Billboard Hot 100. It was nominated for a 2003 Grammy Award for Best Pop Performance by a Duo or Group with Vocals.

"Girl All the Bad Guys Want" came after a dry spell for the band and was followed by the popular album A Hangover You Don't Deserve in 2004, leading frontman Jaret Reddick to refer to it as "the career-saving song" on MTV.

== Music video ==
The music video for "Girl All the Bad Guys Want" was directed by Smith n' Borin and featured Bowling for Soup in various spoofs of nu metal bands' videos, such as Staind's "It's Been Awhile" and Limp Bizkit's "Break Stuff", both of which were directed by Limp Bizkit frontman Fred Durst. In one scene, Jaret Reddick as Staind frontman Aaron Lewis is seen singing with a constipated look on his face and is revealed to be on an actual toilet. Another band member urinates on a wall. In the final "Break Stuff" scene three guys dressed as Corey Taylor, Joey Jordison and Shawn Crahan from Slipknot gang up on Reddick dressed as Durst, a reference to the feud between Slipknot and Limp Bizkit at the time. Guitarist Chris Burney also dresses in a parody of Wes Borland's unconventional stage attire and makeup.

The video is inter cut between these scenes and scenes of a girl, played by Linda Christopher, watching the band on TVs displayed in a store through the front window.

The music video became the last music video to be played on the British music channel Scuzz directly before its closure on November 15, 2018.

== Track listings ==
UK CD1

1. "Girl All the Bad Guys Want" – 3:17
2. "Other Girls" – 3:43
3. "Girl All the Bad Guys Want" (video)

UK CD2

1. "Girl All the Bad Guys Want" – 3:17
2. "Greatest Day" – 3:43
3. "The Bitch Song" (video)

European CD single

1. "Girl All the Bad Guys Want" – 3:17
2. "Other Girls" – 3:43

Australian CD single

1. "Girl All the Bad Guys Want" – 3:17
2. "Emily" – 3:30
3. "Running from Your Dad" – 3:37
4. "Other Girls" – 3:43

== Charts ==
=== Weekly charts ===
Chart (2002–2003)	Peak position
Europe (Eurochart Hot 100)	40
Ireland (IRMA)	15
Netherlands (Single Top 100)	91
Scottish Singles Sales (Official Charts)	6
UK Singles (Official Charts)	8
UK Indie (Official Charts)	1
UK Rock & Metal (Official Charts)	1
US Billboard Hot 100	64
US Adult Top 40 Tracks (Billboard)	39
US Mainstream Top 40 (Billboard)	17
US Modern Rock Tracks (Billboard)	38

=== Year-end charts ===
Chart (2002)	Position
UK Singles (OCC)	137

Chart (2003)	Position
US Mainstream Top 40 (Billboard)	72

== Certifications ==
Region	Certification	Certified units/sales
United Kingdom (BPI)	Platinum	600,000^{‡}
United States (RIAA)	Gold	500,000^{‡}
^{‡} Sales+streaming figures based on certification alone.

== Release history ==
Region	Date	Format(s)	Label(s)	Ref.
United States	July 15, 2002	Alternative radio	Jive; Silvertone	
United Kingdom	August 5, 2002	CD	Music for Nations; Ffroe	
Australia	August 12, 2002	CD	Silvertone	
United States	December 9, 2002	Hot adult contemporary radio	Jive; Silvertone	
United States	December 16, 2002	Contemporary hit radio	Jive; Silvertone	
