= Let's Do It for Johnny!! =

Studio album by Bowling for Soup
- Released: May 16, 2000
- Recorded: 1998–2000
- Genre: Pop-punk
- Length: 44:34; 52:03 (Japanese Edition); 50:39 (Australian Edition)
- Labels: Jive; Silvertone; FFROE
- Producers: Eric Delegard; Jaret Reddick

Bowling for Soup chronology
| Tell Me When to Whoa (1998) | Let's Do It for Johnny!! (2000) | Drunk Enough to Dance (2002) |

Singles from Let's Do It for Johnny!!
- 1. "The Bitch Song" Released: 2000; 2. "Suckerpunch" Released: 2000 (promo)

Professional ratings
Review scores
| Source | Rating |
|---|---|
| AbsolutePunk | Favorable |

Let's Do It for Johnny!! is the third studio album by American rock band Bowling for Soup, released on May 16, 2000, by Jive Records. It was recorded at Reel Time Audio in Denton, Texas, about 100 miles from where the band was formed in Wichita Falls, and featured the group's first hit, "The Bitch Song." It is the first album with Gary Wiseman on drums. The album also features a cover of Bryan Adams' "Summer of '69".

The band re-recorded several of their older songs for this album. Tracks 6, 7, and 8 appeared on the album Rock on Honorable Ones!!, tracks 1, 2, 4, 5, and 9 originally appeared on the EP Tell Me When to Whoa, and track 8 appeared on both Rock on Honorable Ones!! and Tell Me When to Whoa.

== Production and recording ==
It was announced in a band newsletter on July 2, 1999, that drummer Lance Morrill decided to quit the band to focus on the family life after recently getting married. Longtime friend Gary Wiseman would be welcomed as the band's new drummer and would soon get to work recording a new album.

On January 12, 2000, the band made it known that they have been in the recording studio and that they have signed to Jive Records. The title was first mentioned as Let's Do It For Jonnie but Jonnie was later changed to Johnny for unknown reasons. The title takes its name from the 1983 Francis Ford Coppola film The Outsiders.

Tracks such as "Belgium", "Scope", and "The Bitch Song" from previous albums were remixed by Matt Wallace, who had previously worked with Everlast and Faith No More.

Additionally, the band recorded a song "Greatest Day" for a Tiger Woods video game, which was later featured on the following albums Drunk Enough to Dance and Bowling for Soup Goes to the Movies.

== Track listing ==
All tracks are written by Jaret Reddick, except where noted.

| No. | Title | Writer(s) | Length |
|---|---|---|---|
| 1. | "Suckerpunch" | | 3:18 |
| 2. | "The Bitch Song" | | 3:23 |
| 3. | "Pictures He Drew" | | 3:23 |
| 4. | "Dance with You" | | 3:30 |
| 5. | "You and Me" | | 4:06 |
| 6. | "Scope" | Reddick, Eric Delegard | 3:32 |
| 7. | "Valentino" | | 3:28 |
| 8. | "Belgium" | J. Erik Chandler, Reddick, Delegard | 3:24 |
| 9. | "Andrew" | | 2:05 |
| 10. | "Boulevard" | | 3:34 |
| 11. | "Hang On" | | 3:37 |
| 12. | "Summer of '69" | Bryan Adams, Jim Vallance | 3:05 |
| 13. | "All Figured Out" | | 4:14 |
| Total length: | | | 44:34 |

Japanese Edition
| No. | Title | Length |
|---|---|---|
| 14. | "Soho" | 4:57 |
| 15. | "Dumb" | 1:24 |
| 16. | "Everything" | 2:18 |
| Total length: | | 52:03 |

Australian Edition
| No. | Title | Length |
|---|---|---|
| 14. | "Soho" | 4:57 |
| 15. | "Everything" | 2:18 |
| Total length: | | 50:39 |

=== Singles ===
Bowling for Soup made two singles of this album in 2000.

- "The Bitch Song" has a video, where the band is playing the song in a prison, while Jaret remembers the good moments with his girlfriend, whom he calls a bitch.
- "Suckerpunch" has no video, but the band considers this song as a single and has played it at several concerts.

== Personnel ==
Bowling for Soup

- Jaret Reddick — vocals, rhythm guitar, producer
- Erik Chandler — bass, vocals
- Chris Burney — lead guitar, vocals
- Gary Wiseman — drums, vocals on "All Figured Out"

Production

- Eric Delegard — producer, engineering at Reel Time Audio, Denton, TX
- Tom Soares — mixing at Electric Lady Studios, NYC
- Matt Wallace — mixing for "The Bitch Song at Encore Studios, Burbank, CA
- Michael England — recording assistant
- Shinobu Mitsuoka and James McCrone — mix assistants
- Rob Avsharian and Matt Thompson — drum techs
- Greg Calbi — mastering at Sterling Sound, NYC

Additional musicians

- Casey Diiorio — guitars on "Pictures He Drew" and "Boulevard"
- Matt Slider and Eric Delegard — vocals on "All Figured Out"
- Joe Cripps — percussion on "Pictures He Drew," "Scope," "Dance With You," "Belgium," "Hang On" and "All Figured Out"
- Mike Duffy — percussion on "The Bitch Song"
- Michel England — guitar on "All Figured Out"
- Management: Jeff Roe for FFroe Management
- For Booking: Michael Arfin for QBQ Entertainment
- Gilbert Garza — stage manager
- Sweet Charlie — merchandise and assistant to Mr. Von Erich
- Legal Representation: Mike McKoy - Serling, Rooks and Ferrara

== Chart performance ==
Album

Chart performance for Let's Do It for Johnny!!
| Chart (2000-2002) | Peak position |
|---|---|
| UK Independent Albums (Official Charts) | 22 |
| UK Rock & Metal Albums (Official Charts) | 24 |

Singles

| Year | Song | UK Rock |
|---|---|---|
| 2014 | "Summer of '69" | 25 |
