= Drunk Enough to Dance =

Studio album by Bowling for Soup
- Released: August 6, 2002
- Recorded: 2001–2002
- Studios: Tree Sound Studios, Atlanta; Ruby Red Studios, Atlanta; Sonica Recording, Atlanta; Big Time Audio, Dallas
- Genre: Pop-punk
- Length: 58:56
- Labels: Jive; Silvertone; FFROE
- Producers: Butch Walker; Jaret Reddick; Rhys Fulber

Bowling for Soup chronology
Let's Do It for Johnny! (2000)	Drunk Enough to Dance (2002)	A Hangover You Don't Deserve (2004)

Singles from Drunk Enough to Dance
- 1. "Girl All the Bad Guys Want" Released: July 15, 2002; 2. "Emily" Released: November 4, 2002; 3. "Punk Rock 101" Released: May 20, 2003

Drunk Enough to Dance is the fourth studio album and second major label album by American rock band Bowling for Soup. It was recorded from 2001 to 2002 at Tree Sound Studios and Sonica Recording in Atlanta and Big Time Audio in Dallas.

== Production and recording ==
After a UK, Canada and midwest U.S. tour to promote their album Let's Do It for Johnny!, the band ventured out to film the new Britney Spears film Crossroads. After filming, they would head to Atlanta in October 2001 to record their next new album. The album was produced by Butch Walker, formerly of Marvelous 3.

In a newsletter from the band on January 9, 2002, Reddick said they "recorded 14 songs and that the album would contain a bonus track "Greatest Day"... and hopefully a song or two that Butch and I write next month... the import will have three more song that we did here in Dallas last month."

== Release ==
It was released August 6, 2002 through Jive Records. The single, "Girl All the Bad Guys Want," was nominated for a Grammy Award in 2003 in the "Best Pop Performance By A Duo Or Group With Vocal" category. A re-release in 2003 added: "Punk Rock 101"; a cover of 1980s new wave band A Flock of Seagulls' "I Ran (So Far Away)"; and "Star Song". There is an acoustic version of the song "Belgium" at the very end of the album.

"Punk Rock 101" was released as a radio single on May 20, 2003. Between late June and early August, the group appeared on the Warped Tour. The album is certified Silver in the U.K., having sold over 60,000 copies.

== Reception ==
Professional ratings
Review scores
Source	Rating
AllMusic	3/5 stars
Melodic	3/5 stars

The album was included in Rock Sound's 101 Modern Classics list at number 63. The album was included at number 32 on Rock Sound's "The 51 Most Essential Pop Punk Albums of All Time" list. BuzzFeed included the album at number 28 on their "36 Pop Punk Albums You Need To Hear Before You F——ing Die" list. Cleveland.com ranked "Girl All the Bad Guys Want" at number 61 on their list of the top 100 pop-punk songs.

== Track listing ==
All tracks are written by Jaret Reddick, except where noted.

No.	Title	Writer(s)	Length
1.	"I Don't Wanna Rock"		3:04
2.	"Emily"		3:30
3.	"Girl All the Bad Guys Want"	Reddick; Butch Walker	3:18
4.	"On and On (About You)"		3:10
5.	"Surf Colorado"		3:54
6.	"Life After Lisa"	Reddick; Walker	3:09
7.	"Where to Begin"		5:20
8.	"The Last Rock Show"		1:29
9.	"Self-Centered"		3:01
10.	"The Hard Way"		3:10
11.	"Out the Window"		3:21
12.	"Cold Shower Tuesdays"		3:36
13.	"Running from Your Dad"		3:38
14.	"Scaring Myself"		3:32
15.	"She's Got a Boyfriend"		3:51
16.	"Greatest Day"		3:15
17.	"Belgium" (acoustic, hidden track)		4:46
Total length:			58:56

Each version of the album has a number tracks that are five-to-six seconds of complete silence, titled "[Blank]," between the last song and "Belgium." The number of blank tracks varies upon the version, but "Belgium" is track 28 on all versions except for the Japanese Edition, where it is on track 20 after "Other Girls". There is about 1 minute of silence in between both songs.

Bonus tracks

UK edition
No.	Title	Writer(s)	Length
18.	"World Falling Apart" (also appears on U.K. Promo)	Reddick	3:38
Total length:			62:34

Japanese edition
No.	Title	Writer(s)	Length
19.	"Other Girls" (also appears on U.K. and Australian "Girl All the Bad Guys Want" single)	Reddick	3:49
Total length:			62:41

2003 re-release
No.	Title	Writer(s)	Length
18.	"Punk Rock 101" (Special Bonus Track)	Reddick; Walker	3:10
19.	"I Ran (So Far Away)" (Extra Special Bonus Track)	Mike Score; Ali Score; Frank Maudsley; Paul Reynolds	2:35
20.	"Star Song" (Now This is a Super Extra Special Bonus Track)	Reddick; Walker	3:29
Total length:			68:03

B-sides

No.	Title	Length
1.	"Change My Mind" (released on the U.K. "Emily" single)	3:48

== Personnel ==
Bowling for Soup

- Jaret Reddick — vocals, rhythm guitar, producer for "Greatest Day"
- Erik Chandler — bass, vocals
- Chris Burney — lead guitar, vocals
- Gary Wiseman — drums

Production

- Butch Walker - producer, engineering, mixing, percussion, piano, Hammond, additional guitars, additional vocals on "Life After Lisa"
- Tom Lord-Alge - mixing (tracks 3, 18 and 19)
- John Briglevich - additional engineering (track 6)
- Tom Soares - mixing (track 6 and 16)
- Steve Browne - engineering (track 16)
- Rhys Fulber - producer (track 19)
- Chris Shaw - mixing (track 20)
- Jeff "FFroe" Roe and Howie - additional backing vocals on "I Don't Wanna Rock" and "Running from Your Dad"
- Chaz Harper - mastering
- General Assistant to Butch Walker: Christie Priode
- Jamie Muhoberac - keyboards on "I Ran (So Far Away)"
- Management: Jeff Roe for FFroe
- Legal Representation: Mike McKoy - Serling, Rooks, Ferrara
- Road Crew: Sweet Charlie, Greg Lobdell

Assistant Engineers
Tree Sound - Russ-T Cobb and Robert Hannon
Stonehenge at ZAC Recording: Russ-T Cobb and Jon Oullette
Second Engineer: Ari Newman
Sonica Recording: Mike Schneider
Streetlight Studios: Tim Obremski
Electric Lady: Shinobu Mitsuoka
Ruby Red Studios: Russ-T Cobb
Avatar Studios: Ross Petersen

Locations

- Produced, engineered and mixed by Butch Walker at Ruby Red Productions, Atlanta
- Basic Tracks Recorded at Tree Studios, Atlanta, except "Punk Rock 101," "I Ran (So Far Away)" and "Star Song" Recorded at Ruby Red Studios, Atlanta, "Life After Lisa" Recorded at Sonica Recording, Atlanta and "Greatest Day" Recorded at Big Time Audio, Dallas.
- Overdubs Recorded at Ruby Red Studios, Atlanta, except "Life After Lisa" Recorded at Sonica Recording and "Greatest Day" Recorded at Big Time Audio
- Mixed at Stonehenge at ZAC Recording, Atlanta, except "Girl All the Bad Guys Want," "Punk Rock 101" and "I Ran (So Far Away)," Mixed at South Beach Studios, Miama, "Star Song" Mixed at Avatar Studios, NYC, "Life After Lisa" Mixed at Streetlight Studios, NYC and "Greatest Day" Mixed at Electric Lady Studios, New York
- Mastered by Chaz Harper at Battery Mastering, New York

== Charts ==
Chart performance for Drunk Enough to Dance
Chart (2002–2003)	Peak position
Irish Albums (IRMA)	25
Scottish Albums (Official Charts)	16
UK Albums (Official Charts)	14
UK Independent Albums (Official Charts)	2
UK Rock & Metal Albums (Official Charts)	3
US Billboard 200	129
US Heatseekers Albums (Billboard)	2

== Certifications ==
Certifications for Drunk Enough to Dance
Region	Certification	Certified units/sales
United Kingdom (BPI)	Silver	60,000^{^}
^{^} Shipments figures based on certification alone.

== Notes ==
- A ^ Featured in frontman Jaret Reddick's seventh Bowling for Soup podcast, released March 10, 2010.
