= Tell Me When to Whoa! =

Tell Me When To Whoa!

EP by Bowling for Soup
- Released: June 1998; July 1999 (re-release)
- Studio: Reeltime Audio
- Genre: Pop-punk
- Length: 25:57; 29:20 (re-release)
- Label: FFROE
- Producer: Eric Delegard

Bowling for Soup chronology
Rock on Honorable Ones!! (1998)	Tell Me When To Whoa! (1998)	Let's Do It for Johnny!! (2000)

Tell Me When to Whoa! is the first EP by Bowling for Soup, released in June 1998, and later re-released in 1999, on the local Denton music label FFROE. Although released as an EP, the release is considered a studio album by singer Jaret Reddick. It is currently out of print. It is the last studio recording by the band to feature Lance Morrill on drums.

== Production and recording ==
In a band newsletter on August 24, 1998, it was announced that the band would work again with Jeff Roe recording in Denton, Texas, and record at Reel Time Audio and release a new album titled Tell Me When To Whoa! through FFROE Records.

This would be the last album to feature drummer Lance Morrill, who in 1998, got married and decided to move on with life, and would soon quit the band. Morrill's replacement was announced to be Gary Wiseman later that year.

The album was reissued in July 1999 and included one new song on the CD, "The Bitch Song", which was receiving radio play around the country. It was again reissued in 2011 for a digital release.

== Tracks ==
No.	Title	Writer(s)	Length
1.	"Suckerpunch"	Jaret Reddick	3:19
2.	"Soho"		4:57
3.	"You and Me"	Reddick	4:41
4.	"Dance with You"	Reddick	3:34
5.	"Belgium"	Erik Chandler, Reddick, Eric Delegard	3:31
6.	"Everything"		2:18
7.	"Andrew"	Reddick	2:05
Total length:			24:25

Re-Release Version
No.	Title	Writer(s)	Length
1.	"The Bitch Song" (first track on re-release)	Reddick	3:21
Total length:			27:46

== Personnel ==
Bowling for Soup

- Chris Burney — guitar, backing vocals
- Erik Chandler — bass, backing vocals
- Lance Morrill — drums, backing vocals
- Jaret Reddick — lead vocals, guitar
