= Punk Rock 101 =

2003 single by Bowling for Soup

Single by Bowling for Soup

from the album Drunk Enough to Dance
- Released: May 20, 2003
- Genre: Pop-punk
- Length: 3:08
- Label: Zomba; Music for Nations; Jive
- Songwriters: Jaret Reddick; Butch Walker
- Producer: Butch Walker

Bowling for Soup singles chronology
"Emily" (2002)	"Punk Rock 101" (2003)	"Here We Go" (2004)

"Punk Rock 101" is a song by American pop-punk band Bowling for Soup. It appeared on the 2003 edition of their 2002 album Drunk Enough to Dance. "Punk Rock 101" was released to radio on May 20, 2003. The single peaked at number 43 on the UK Singles Chart.

== Allusions ==
- The line "But Fat Mike's his hero" references Fat Mike, the bassist and vocalist for the punk rock band NOFX.
- The line "It's stupid, contagious" is an allusion to lyrics from Nirvana's song "Smells Like Teen Spirit". In addition, the name of the song is taken from a line in Kurt Cobain's suicide note.
- This song was also featured in the featured in the 2006 family superhero comedy movie Zoom (also released as Zoom: Academy for Superheroes)
- The lyric "Like Tommy and Gina/They're living on a prayer" is an allusion to lyrics from Bon Jovi's song "Livin' on a Prayer". Bon Jovi themselves are also mentioned in the lyric "She left him for staring at girls and not caring when she cried cause she thought Bon Jovi broke up."

== Charts ==
Chart (2003)	Peak position
Scottish Singles Sales (Official Charts)	44
UK Singles (Official Charts)	43
UK Independent (Official Charts)	6
UK Rock & Metal (Official Charts)	6

== Release history ==
Region	Date	Format(s)	Label(s)	Ref.
United States	May 20, 2003	Modern rock radio	Zomba	
United Kingdom	August 25, 2003	CD	Music for Nations	
