= Toadies discography =

This is the discography for American alternative rock band Toadies.

== Studio albums ==
| Year | Album details | Peak chart positions | | | | Sales | Certifications |
| Year | Album details | US | US Heat | US Indie | US Rock | Sales | Certifications |
|---|---|---|---|---|---|---|---|
| 1989 | Slaphead: Released: 1989; Label: self-released; Formats: CS | — | — | — | — | | |
| 1994 | Rubberneck: Released: August 23, 1994; Label: Interscope Records (92402); Formats: CD, CS, LP | 56 | 1 | — | — | US :1,020,000+ | RIAA: Platinum |
| 2001 | Hell Below/Stars Above: Released: March 20, 2001; Label: Interscope Records (0694908722); Format: CD, LP | 130 | — | — | — | US: 61,000+ | |
| 2008 | No Deliverance: Released: August 19, 2008; Label: Kirtland Records (KR-46); Formats: CD, LP, digital download | 59 | — | 4 | 19 | US: 39,000+ | |
| 2010 | Feeler: Released: August 10, 2010; Label: Kirtland Records (KR-50); Formats: CD, LP, digital download | — | — | — | — | | |
| 2012 | Play.Rock.Music: Released: July 31, 2012; Label: Kirtland Records; Formats: CD, LP, digital download | — (Note: Play.Rock.Music reached number 159 on Billboard's United States Top Current Albums chart, not the regular Billboard 200 that also includes catalog albums in addition to current records.) | — | 35 | — | | |
| 2015 | Heretics: Released: September 18, 2015; Label: Kirtland Records; Formats: CD, LP, digital download | — | — | — | — | | |
| 2017 | The Lower Side of Uptown: Released: September 8, 2017; Label: Kirtland Records; Formats: CD, LP, digital download | — | — | 40 | — | | |
| 2026 | The Charmer: Released: May 1, 2026; Label: Spaceflight Records; Formats: CD, LP, digital download | — | — | — | — | | |

== Live albums ==
| Year | Album details |
|---|---|
| 2002 | Best of Toadies: Live from Paradise: Released: November 19, 2002; Label: Aezra Records, Orpheus Music (80246 90220); Format: CD |
| 2007 | Rock Show: Released: March 17, 2007; Label: DiscLive, Kirtland Records; Formats: limited edition CD-R, digital download |
| 2010 | Live at Austin City Limits Music Festival: Released: April 15, 2010; Label: ACLMF Records; Format: digital download |
| 2018 | Live at Billy Bobs Texas: Released: September 23, 2018; Label: Kirtland Records; Format: CD, DVD, Vinyl |

== Extended plays ==
| Year | EP details |
|---|---|
| 1992 | Velvet: Released: 1992; Label: self-released; Formats: cassette, EP |
| 1993 | Pleather: Released: 1993; Label: Grass Records; Format: CD, EP, reissue |
| 2008 | Live at Lollapalooza: Released: 2008; Label: Kirtland Records; Format: file, MP3, EP |
| 2022 | Damn You All to Hell: Released: September 13, 2022; Label: Kirtland Records; Format: file, MP3, EP |

== Singles ==
| Year | Title | Peak chart positions | | | Album |
| Year | Title | US Air | US Main | US Mod | Album |
|---|---|---|---|---|---|
| 1990 | "Dig a Hole" | — | — | — | Slaphead |
| 1993 | "Mister Love" | — | — | — | Velvet |
| 1994 | "Mister Love" | — | — | — | Rubberneck |
| 1995 | "Possum Kingdom" | 40 | 9 | 4 | Rubberneck |
| 1995 | "Away" | — | 23 | 28 | Rubberneck |
| 1996 | "Tyler" | — | — | — | Rubberneck |
| 1996 | "Backslider" | — | — | — | Rubberneck |
| 2001 | "Push the Hand" | — | 34 | — | Hell Below/Stars Above |
| 2008 | "No Deliverance" | — | 38 | — | No Deliverance |
| 2009 | "Song I Hate" | — | — | — | No Deliverance |
| 2012 | "Summer of the Strange" | — | — | — | Play.Rock.Music |
| 2013 | "Down by the Water" | — | — | — | Non-album single |
| 2015 | "In the Belly of a Whale" | — | — | — | Heretics |
| 2016 | "Heroes" (David Bowie cover) | — | — | — | Non-album single |
| 2020 | "You're Not Alone" | — | — | — | Non-album single |
| 2023 | "Since U Been Gone" (Kelly Clarkson cover) | — | — | — | Non-album single |
| 2026 | "The Charmer" | — | — | — | The Charmer |
"—" denotes a release that did not chart.

Split singles

- Belated Valentines split w/ Slowpoke (1995) – "Not in Love" (David Byrne)

== Demo releases ==
- 4-track Demos (1989)
- Chatterbox (1990)
- Y're Cute (1995)

== Compilations and soundtracks ==
The following list includes only non-album and unreleased tracks.

| Year | Title | Song | Label |
|---|---|---|---|
| 1992 | Heaven on a Stick: A Tribute to Cheap Trick | "Auf Wiedersehen" | Slugfest Records |
| 1993 | Chairman of the Board: Frank Sinatra Tribute | "Luck Be a Lady" | Grass Records |
| 1995 | Dallas' Scene, Heard | "Unattractive" (demo) | Observer Records |
| 1995 | Saturday Morning: Cartoons' Greatest Hits | "Goolie Get-Together" | MCA Records |
| 1996 | The Cable Guy Soundtrack | "Unattractive" | WORK/Sony Music |
| 1996 | WRAS 88.5 Presents Radio Oddyssey | "Cut Me Out" (live) | Hypnotic Records |
| 1996 | The Crow: City of Angels Soundtrack | "Paper Dress" | Hollywood Records |
| 1996 | Escape from L.A. Soundtrack | "Cut Me Out" | Lava Records |
| 1996 | Basquiat Soundtrack | "I'm Not in Love" | Island Records |
| 1996 | Sandy Does Dallas | "Beauty School Dropout" | One Ton Records |
| 1997 | Come On Feel the Metal | "The Cowboy Song" | Steve Records |
| 2000 | KISW 99.9 Live @ Bob's Garage Vol. 1 | "Possum Kingdom" (live) | no label |
| 2001 | Monitor This! April/May 2001 | "Joey, Let's Go" | Music Monitor |
