= Dia De Los Toadies =

Annual music festival

Coordinates: 29.86172°N 98.15697°W

- Dates: June 11, 2016
- Locations: New Braunfels, Texas (2010-12, 2016); Fort Worth, Texas (2013-15); Glen Rose, Texas (2009); Possum Kingdom Lake (2008)
- Years active: 2008–2017
- Website: www.diadelostoadies.com

Dia De Los Toadies is an annual music festival organized by perennial headlining act Toadies. First held in August 2008 at Possum Kingdom Lake, the festival has subsequently been held in Glen Rose, New Braunfels, and at Panther Island Pavilion in Fort Worth. The ninth annual festival was held on June 11, 2016 in New Braunfels. The annual festival has been described as "the Willie's Picnic of a new generation."

== History ==
The Toadies, a Texas-based alternative rock band, saw nationwide exposure in 1994 with the release of their platinum-selling debut album, Rubberneck and multiple singles including the Billboard-charting Possum Kingdom, a reference to Possum Kingdom Lake near Fort Worth, Texas. However, sales of the band's subsequent album were lackluster, and the band broke up in 2001.

After a seven-year hiatus, the band reunited in 2008 to release a new album, No Deliverance, and play a new tour in support of the album. While organizing the new album and tour, the band learned that there was high demand for them to play at Texas music festivals. Citing Willie Nelson's Fourth of July Picnic as their inspiration, the Toadies chose instead to organize their own festival, staging the "first annual" Dia De Los Toadies on the shore of Possum Kingdom Lake on August 31, 2008. The Toadies chose the name Dia De Los Toadies because it was not location-specific, permitting the band to move the festival to other locations in subsequent years.

The festival annually features a number of Texas-based musical acts, and exclusively featured bands from Texas in its first four years. Toadies frontman Vaden Todd Lewis has commented that "the idea has been to highlight Texas bands." Texas performers featured at Dia De Los Toadies have included Bowling for Soup, The Old 97's, Black Joe Lewis & the Honeybears, The Sword, Secret Machines, Gary Clark, Jr., and Sixteen Deluxe.

Dia De Los Toadies had a reported attendance of over 5,000 people in its first year. In its second year, Dia De Los Toadies moved to Rough Creek Lodge in Glen Rose for another one-day event on August 29, 2009. In 2010 the festival grew to a two-day event, and from 2010 to 2012 was held at the WhiteWater Amphiteater, a 5,500-person waterfront venue in New Braunfels. In 2013, the festival moved to Panther Island Pavilion in Fort Worth.

On January 27, 2016, the Toadies announced that the ninth annual Dia De Los Toadies would be held on June 11, 2016 in New Braunfels, Texas. The Toadies and The Reverend Horton Heat were initially announced as headlining acts for the 2016 event. The complete lineup will also include Texas artists Purple, Emily Wolfe, and the Golden Meanies, plus Colorado-based In The Whale, who opened for the Toadies during most stops on the Toadies' 2015 Heretics tour.

== Lineups ==
Year	Performers
2017	Toadies, Local H, Riverboat Gamblers, The O’s, Oil Boom, Quiet Company, Baboon, Ting Tang Tina
2016	Toadies, The Reverend Horton Heat, Purple, Emily Wolfe, Golden Meanies, In The Whale
2015	Toadies, Burden Brothers, Local H, Holy Moly, The Buck Pets, Sealion, Sarah Jaffe, Son of Stan, Gollay
2014	Toadies, Rhett Miller, Old 97's, Quaker City Nighthawks, Pleasant Grove, Somebody's Darling, Residual Kid, The Longshots, Blank-Men
2013	Toadies, Gary Clark, Jr., Eisley, Dirty River Boys, The Burning Hotels, The O's, Piñata Protest, Oil Boom, Baboon, The Cush, These Machines Are Winning
2012	Toadies, Helmet, Mariachi El Bronx, Sixteen Deluxe, The Riverboat Gamblers, Brutal Juice, King Bucks, The Soldier Thread, Cartwright, The Phuss
2011	Toadies, The Sword, The Black Angels, Ume, Quiet Company, Whiskey Folk Ramblers, The Orbans, Faceless Werewolves, The Couch, Tornahdo, Trashy Charmer, Boy+Kite
2010	Toadies, Black Joe Lewis & the Honeybears, Heartless Bastards, Centro-Matic, Sleepercar, Girl in a Coma, Two Tons of Steel, The Bright Light Social Hour, Descender, Here Holy Spain
2009	Toadies, Bowling for Soup, Secret Machines, Ben Kweller, Eleven Hundred Springs, The Boom Boom Box
2008	Toadies, Lions, Dove Hunter, The Backsliders, Tejas Brothers
