= 2012 in downloadable songs for the Rock Band series =

- Songs released: 205
- Packs released: 34
- Albums released: 3

The Rock Band series of music video games supports downloadable songs for the Xbox 360, PlayStation 3, and Wii versions through the consoles' respective online services. Users can download songs on a track-by-track basis, with many of the tracks also offered as part of a "song pack" or complete album at a discounted rate. These packs are available for the Wii only on Rock Band 3. Most downloadable songs are playable within every game mode, including the Band World Tour career mode. All downloadable songs released before October 26, 2010 are cross-compatible between Rock Band, Rock Band 2 and Rock Band 3, while those after only work with Rock Band 3. All songs that are available to Rock Band 3 will be playable in Rock Band Blitz. Certain songs deemed "suitable for all ages" by Harmonix are also available for use in Lego Rock Band.

The Wii version of Rock Band does not support downloadable content, but Rock Band 2 and Rock Band 3 do, with DLC first made available in January 2009. Songs from the back catalogue of downloadable content were released for the Wii weekly in an effort by Harmonix to provide Wii players with every previously available song.

Following the release of Rock Band 4 for the PlayStation 4 and Xbox One, all previously purchased downloadable content for Rock Band 3 and earlier is forward compatible (with the exception of any downloadable content purchased for The Beatles: Rock Band) within the same system family at no additional cost.

== List of songs released in 2012 ==
The following table lists the available songs for the Rock Band series released in 2012. All songs available in packs are also available as individual song downloads on the same date, unless otherwise noted. New songs are released on Tuesdays for Xbox Live, PlayStation Network, and Nintendo WFC, unless otherwise noted. Dates listed are the initial release of songs on Xbox Live. Starting May 20, 2008, all downloadable songs are available in both the North American and European markets, unless otherwise noted.

As of October 2009, over 800 songs have been made available as downloadable content (DLC). As of October 19, 2009, over 60 million downloadable song purchases have been made by players. The following is a list of the songs that have been released in 2012.

Some songs released before Rock Band 3 have been retrofitted to include Rock Band 3 features, including backing vocals, and the ability to buy an additional pack for Pro Guitar/Bass charts without having to buy the "RB3 Version" of the song. Certain songs have been marked "family friendly" by Harmonix; such songs released before Rock Band 3's launch on October 26, 2010 can be played in Lego Rock Band.

Since October 26, 2010 (with The Doors Pack 01), all new songs are only playable in Rock Band 3, due to a change in the file format. All songs released via downloadable content are playable in Rock Band 3, and support its new Pro Drum mode. Most songs released for Rock Band 3 include core features for keyboards, Pro Keyboards, and backing vocals in the core song, where they are appropriate. Additionally, some of these songs features charts for Pro Guitar and Bass that can also be purchased.

Song title	Artist	Year	Genre	Single / Pack name	Release date	Family Friendly	Additional Rock Band 3 Features
"Private Eyes"	Hall & Oates	1981	Pop-Rock	Hall & Oates 01	Jan 10, 2012	Yes	Core & Pro Guitar/Bass
"I Can't Go for That (No Can Do)"	Hall & Oates	1981	Pop-Rock	Hall & Oates 01	Jan 10, 2012	Yes	Core
"Maneater"	Hall & Oates	1982	Pop-Rock	Hall & Oates 01	Jan 10, 2012	Yes	Core
"Free Ride"	The Edgar Winter Group	1972	Classic Rock	Single	Jan 17, 2012	Yes	Core
"Frankenstein"	The Edgar Winter Group	1972	Classic Rock	Single	Jan 17, 2012	Yes	Core & Pro Guitar/Bass
"Freak on a Leash"	Korn	1998	Nu-Metal	Single	Jan 17, 2012	No	Core
"Falling Away From Me"	Korn	1998	Nu-Metal	Single	Jan 17, 2012	No	Core
"Lodi"	Creedence Clearwater Revival	1969	Southern Rock	Creedence Clearwater Revival 02	Jan 24, 2012	No	Core
"Have You Ever Seen the Rain?"	Creedence Clearwater Revival	1970	Southern Rock	Creedence Clearwater Revival 02	Jan 24, 2012	Yes	Core & Pro Guitar/Bass
"Susie Q"	Creedence Clearwater Revival	1968	Southern Rock	Creedence Clearwater Revival 02	Jan 24, 2012	Yes	Core
"Fat Lip" (Note: Song is no longer available for purchase.)	Sum 41	2001	Punk	Single	Jan 31, 2012	No	Core & Pro Guitar/Bass
"Still Waiting"	Sum 41	2002	Punk	Single	Jan 31, 2012	No	Core
"Head Over Heels"	Tears for Fears	1985	New Wave	Single	Jan 31, 2012	Yes	Core
"Everything Zen"	Bush	1994	Grunge	Bush 01	Feb 7, 2012	No	Core
"Comedown"	Bush	1994	Grunge	Bush 01	Feb 7, 2012	No	Core
"Machinehead"	Bush	1994	Grunge	Bush 01	Feb 7, 2012	No	Core & Pro Guitar/Bass
"Alone"	Heart	1987	Classic Rock	Gold Star My Heart	Feb 14, 2012	Yes	Core
"To Be With You"	Mr. Big	1991	Rock	Gold Star My Heart	Feb 14, 2012	Yes	Core & Pro Guitar/Bass
"Every Rose Has Its Thorn"	Poison	1988	Glam	Gold Star My Heart	Feb 14, 2012	No	Core & Pro Guitar/Bass
"Never Gonna Give You Up"	Rick Astley	1987	Pop/Dance/Electronic	Gold Star My Heart	Feb 14, 2012	Yes	Core
"Symphony of Destruction"	Megadeth	1992	Metal	Megadeth 01	Feb 21, 2012	No	Core & Pro Guitar/Bass
"A Tout le Monde"	Megadeth	1994	Metal	Megadeth 01	Feb 21, 2012	No	Core
"Public Enemy No. 1"	Megadeth	2011	Metal	Megadeth 01	Feb 21, 2012	No	Core
"Do You Believe in Love"	Huey Lewis and The News	1982	Rock	Huey Lewis and The News 01	Feb 28, 2012	Yes	Core
"The Heart of Rock & Roll"	Huey Lewis and The News	1983	Rock	Huey Lewis and The News 01	Feb 28, 2012	Yes	Core
"I Want a New Drug"	Huey Lewis and The News	1983	Rock	Huey Lewis and The News 01	Feb 28, 2012	No	Core & Pro Guitar/Bass
"Santa Monica"	Everclear	1995	Alternative	Single	Mar 6, 2012	Yes	Core & Pro Guitar/Bass
"The Anthem"	Good Charlotte	2002	Pop-Rock	Single	Mar 6, 2012	No	Core
"Curl of the Burl"	Mastodon	2011	Metal	Single	Mar 6, 2012	No	Core
"The Good Life"	Three Days Grace	2009	Rock	Three Days Grace 01	Mar 13, 2012	Yes	Core
"I Hate Everything About You"	Three Days Grace	2003	Rock	Three Days Grace 01	Mar 13, 2012	No	Core
"Pain"	Three Days Grace	2006	Rock	Three Days Grace 01	Mar 13, 2012	No	Core & Pro Guitar/Bass
"Down Under"	Men at Work	1982	New Wave	Single	Mar 20, 2012	No	Core
"Overkill"	Men at Work	1983	New Wave	Single	Mar 20, 2012	Yes	Core
"Smooth"	Santana (ft. Rob Thomas)	1999	Rock	Single	Mar 20, 2012	Yes	Core & Pro Guitar/Bass
"Second Chance"	Shinedown	2008	Nu-Metal	Sounds of Shinedown Pack	Mar 27, 2012	No	Core & Pro Guitar/Bass
"The Crow and the Butterfly"	Shinedown	2008	Nu-Metal	Sounds of Shinedown Pack	Mar 27, 2012	No	Core
"Bully"	Shinedown	2012	Nu-Metal	Sounds of Shinedown Pack	Mar 27, 2012	No	Core
"Everybody's Fool"	Evanescence	2003	Nu-Metal	Evanescence 02	Apr 3, 2012	Yes	Core & Pro Guitar/Bass
"Lithium"	Evanescence	2006	Nu-Metal	Evanescence 02	Apr 3, 2012	No	Core
"What You Want"	Evanescence	2011	Nu-Metal	Evanescence 02	Apr 3, 2012	Yes	Core
"Raining Blood"	Slayer	1986	Metal	Slayer 01	Apr 10, 2012	No	Core & Pro Guitar/Bass
"South of Heaven"	Slayer	1988	Metal	Slayer 01	Apr 10, 2012	No	Core
"Seasons in the Abyss"	Slayer	1990	Metal	Slayer 01	Apr 10, 2012	No	Core
"Get the Party Started"	P!nk	2001	Pop-Rock	P!nk 01	Apr 17, 2012	No	Core & Pro Guitar/Bass
"Funhouse"	P!nk	2008	Pop-Rock	P!nk 01	Apr 17, 2012	No	Core
"Please Don't Leave Me"	P!nk	2008	Pop-Rock	P!nk 01	Apr 17, 2012	Yes	Core
"Sober"	P!nk	2008	Pop-Rock	P!nk 01	Apr 17, 2012	No	Core
"Nobody's Fool"	Cinderella	1986	Glam	Cinderella 01	Apr 24, 2012	Yes	Core
"Don't Know What You Got (Till It's Gone)"	Cinderella	1988	Glam	Cinderella 01	Apr 24, 2012	Yes	Core & Pro Guitar/Bass
"Shelter Me"	Cinderella	1990	Glam	Cinderella 01	Apr 24, 2012	No	Core
"Two Tickets to Paradise"	Eddie Money	1977	Classic Rock	Single	May 1, 2012	Yes	Core & Pro Guitar/Bass
"Only One"	Yellowcard	2003	Emo	Single	May 1, 2012	Yes	Core
"Drops of Jupiter"	Train	2001	Pop-Rock	Single	May 1, 2012	Yes	Core & Pro Guitar/Bass
"Bombtrack"	Rage Against the Machine	1992	Alternative	Rage Against the Machine 01	May 8, 2012	No	Core & Pro Guitar/Bass
"Killing in the Name"	Rage Against the Machine	1992	Alternative	Rage Against the Machine 01	May 8, 2012	No	Core
"Sleep Now in the Fire"	Rage Against the Machine	1999	Alternative	Rage Against the Machine 01	May 8, 2012	No	Core
"Ignorance"	Paramore	2009	Pop-Rock	Paramore 01	May 15, 2012	Yes	Core
"Brick by Boring Brick"	Paramore	2009	Pop-Rock	Paramore 01	May 15, 2012	Yes	Core
"The Only Exception"	Paramore	2009	Pop-Rock	Paramore 01	May 15, 2012	Yes	Core & Pro Guitar/Bass
"Phantom of the Opera"	Iron Maiden	1980	Metal	Maiden Epics	May 22, 2012	Yes	Core
"The Prisoner"	Iron Maiden	1982	Metal	Maiden Epics	May 22, 2012	No	Core
"Flight of Icarus"	Iron Maiden	1983	Metal	Maiden Epics	May 22, 2012	Yes	Core & Pro Guitar/Bass
"Rime of the Ancient Mariner"	Iron Maiden	1984	Metal	Maiden Epics	May 22, 2012	Yes	Core & Pro Guitar/Bass
"Infinite Dreams"	Iron Maiden	1988	Metal	Maiden Epics	May 22, 2012	Yes	Core
"Seventh Son of a Seventh Son"	Iron Maiden	1988	Metal	Maiden Epics	May 22, 2012	Yes	Core
"Tears Don't Fall"	Bullet for My Valentine	2006	Metal	Bullet for My Valentine 01	May 29, 2012	No	Core
"Scream Aim Fire"	Bullet for My Valentine	2008	Metal	Bullet for My Valentine 01	May 29, 2012	No	Core
"Your Betrayal"	Bullet for My Valentine	2010	Metal	Bullet for My Valentine 01	May 29, 2012	No	Core & Pro Guitar/Bass
"Teen Angst (What the World Needs Now)"	Cracker	1992	Alternative	Single	Jun 5, 2012	No	Core & Pro Guitar/Bass
"Dog Days Are Over"	Florence + the Machine	2009	Indie Rock	Single	Jun 5, 2012	Yes	Core
"Power and the Passion"	Midnight Oil	1982	New Wave	Single	Jun 5, 2012	Yes	Core
"Drive"	Incubus	1999	Alternative	Single	Jun 12, 2012	Yes	Core
"The Adventure"	Angels & Airwaves	2006	Alternative	Single	Jun 19, 2012	Yes	Core
"Fireflies"	Owl City	2009	Pop/Dance/Electronic	Single	Jun 19, 2012	Yes	Core
"In My Head"	Queens of the Stone Age	2005	Alternative	Single	Jun 19, 2012	No	Core & Pro Guitar/Bass
"Before He Cheats"	Carrie Underwood	2005	Country	Carrie Underwood 01	Jun 26, 2012	No	Core
"Cowboy Casanova"	Carrie Underwood	2009	Country	Carrie Underwood 01	Jun 26, 2012	No	Core
"Good Girl"	Carrie Underwood	2012	Country	Carrie Underwood 01	Jun 26, 2012	Yes	Core & Pro Guitar/Bass
"Gonzo"	All-American Rejects	2012	Emo	Single	Jul 3, 2012	Yes	Core
"Happy?"	Mudvayne	2005	Metal	Single	Jul 3, 2012	No	Core & Pro Guitar/Bass
"Satellite"	Rise Against	2011	Punk	Single	Jul 3, 2012	Yes	Core
"It's Not Over"	Daughtry	2006	Rock	Daughtry 01	Jul 10, 2012	Yes	Core
"No Surprise"	Daughtry	2009	Rock	Daughtry 01	Jul 10, 2012	Yes	Core & Pro Guitar/Bass
"Crawling Back to You"	Daughtry	2011	Rock	Daughtry 01	Jul 10, 2012	Yes	Core
"Love Shack"	The B-52's	1989	New Wave	Single	Jul 17, 2012	Yes	Core & Pro Guitar/Bass
"Not Again"	Staind	2011	Nu-Metal	Single	Jul 17, 2012	Yes	Core
"My Body"	Young the Giant	2010	Indie Rock	Single	Jul 17, 2012	Yes	Core
"Helena Beat"	Foster the People	2011	Indie Rock	Foster the People 01	Jul 24, 2012	Yes	Core
"Don't Stop (Color on the Walls)"	Foster the People	2011	Indie Rock	Foster the People 01	Jul 24, 2012	Yes	Core
"Under Cover of Darkness"	The Strokes	2011	Rock	Single	Jul 24, 2012	Yes	Core & Pro Guitar/Bass
"The End of Heartache"	Killswitch Engage	2004	Metal	Killswitch Engage 01	Jul 31, 2012	Yes	Core & Pro Guitar/Bass
"The Arms of Sorrow"	Killswitch Engage	2006	Metal	Killswitch Engage 01	Jul 31, 2012	Yes	Core
"Starting Over"	Killswitch Engage	2009	Metal	Killswitch Engage 01	Jul 31, 2012	Yes	Core
"(I Just) Died in Your Arms"	Cutting Crew	1986	New Wave	Single	Aug 7, 2012	Yes	Core & Pro Guitar/Bass
"Still of the Night"	Whitesnake	1987	Glam	Single	Aug 7, 2012	No	Core
"Crawling in the Dark"	Hoobastank	2001	Alternative	Single	Aug 7, 2012	Yes	Core
"I Want to Know What Love Is"	Foreigner	1983	Classic Rock	Single	Aug 14, 2012	Yes	Core
"Waiting for a Girl Like You"	Foreigner	1981	Classic Rock	Single	Aug 14, 2012	No	Core
"Amaranth"	Nightwish	2007	Metal	Single	Aug 14, 2012	Yes	Core & Pro Guitar/Bass
"Tighten Up"	The Black Keys	2010	Rock	The Black Keys 02	Aug 21, 2012	Yes	Core & Pro Guitar/Bass
"Howlin' for You"	The Black Keys	2010	Rock	The Black Keys 02	Aug 21, 2012	Yes	Core
"Lonely Boy"	The Black Keys	2011	Rock	The Black Keys 02	Aug 21, 2012	Yes	Core
"Breaking the Habit"	Linkin Park	2003	Nu-Metal	Linkin Park 02	Sep 4, 2012	Yes	Core
"Shadow of the Day"	Linkin Park	2007	Nu-Metal	Linkin Park 02	Sep 4, 2012	Yes	Core
"New Divide"	Linkin Park	2009	Nu-Metal	Linkin Park 02	Sep 4, 2012	Yes	Core & Pro Guitar/Bass
"Burn It Down"	Linkin Park	2012	Nu-Metal	Linkin Park 02	Sep 4, 2012	Yes	Core
"Bent"	Matchbox Twenty	2000	Alternative	Matchbox Twenty 01	Sep 11, 2012	Yes	Core
"How Far We've Come"	Matchbox Twenty	2007	Alternative	Matchbox Twenty 01	Sep 11, 2012	Yes	Core & Pro Guitar/Bass
"She's So Mean"	Matchbox Twenty	2012	Alternative	Matchbox Twenty 01	Sep 11, 2012	No	Core
"Days Go By"	The Offspring	2012	Punk	Single	Sep 18, 2012	Yes	Core & Pro Guitar/Bass
"Why Can't We Be Friends?"	Smash Mouth	1997	Pop-Rock	Single	Sep 18, 2012	No	Core
"Can’t Get Enough of You Baby"	Smash Mouth	1999	Pop-Rock	Single	Sep 18, 2012	Yes	Core
"Oh Love"	Green Day	2012	Rock	Green Day 03	Sep 25, 2012	Yes	Core
"Brain Stew / Jaded" (Note: Songs are also available as imports from Green Day: Rock Band.)	Green Day	1995	Punk	Green Day 03	Sep 25, 2012	No	Backing vocals
"Good Riddance (Time of Your Life)"	Green Day	1997	Punk	Green Day 03	Sep 25, 2012	Yes	None
"Warning"	Green Day	2000	Rock	Green Day 03	Sep 25, 2012	Yes	Backing vocals
"Minority"	Green Day	2000	Rock	Green Day 03	Sep 25, 2012	Yes	Backing vocals
"Down"	311	1995	Alternative	311 01	Oct 2, 2012	Yes	Core & Pro Guitar/Bass
"Beautiful Disaster"	311	1997	Alternative	311 01	Oct 2, 2012	Yes	Core
"Amber"	311	2001	Alternative	311 01	Oct 2, 2012	Yes	Core
"I Ran (So Far Away)"	A Flock of Seagulls	1982	New Wave	Single	Oct 9, 2012	Yes	Core
"The Stroke"	Billy Squier	1981	Classic Rock	Single	Oct 9, 2012	No	Core & Pro Guitar/Bass
"Everybody Wants You"	Billy Squier	1982	Classic Rock	Single	Oct 9, 2012	No	Core
"Come On Eileen"	Save Ferris	1997	Reggae/Ska	Single	Oct 16, 2012	No	Core & Pro Guitar/Bass
"All I Wanna Do"	Sheryl Crow	1993	Pop-Rock	Single	Oct 16, 2012	No	Core
"Animal I Have Become"	Three Days Grace	2006	Rock	Single	Oct 16, 2012	Yes	Core
"Make Me Smile"	Chicago	1970	Classic Rock	Chicago 01	Oct 23, 2012	Yes	Core & Pro Guitar/Bass
"Feelin' Stronger Every Day"	Chicago	1973	Classic Rock	Chicago 01	Oct 23, 2012	Yes	Core
"If You Leave Me Now"	Chicago	1976	Classic Rock	Chicago 01	Oct 23, 2012	Yes	Core
"What I Got"	Sublime	1996	Reggae/Ska	Sublime 01	Oct 29, 2012	No	Core
"Wrong Way"	Sublime	1996	Reggae/Ska	Sublime 01	Oct 29, 2012	No	Core
"Santeria"	Sublime	1996	Reggae/Ska	Sublime 01	Oct 29, 2012	No	Core & Pro Guitar/Bass
"Ants Marching"	Dave Matthews Band	1994	Rock	Dave Matthews Band 01	Nov 6, 2012	Yes	Core & Pro Guitar/Bass
"Mercy"	Dave Matthews Band	2012	Rock	Dave Matthews Band 01	Nov 6, 2012	Yes	Core
"So Much to Say"	Dave Matthews Band	1996	Rock	Dave Matthews Band 01	Nov 6, 2012	Yes	Core
"I'm Alright"	Kenny Loggins	1980	Pop-Rock	Single	Nov 13, 2012	Yes	Core
"Footloose"	Kenny Loggins	1984	Pop-Rock	Single	Nov 13, 2012	Yes	Core & Pro Guitar/Bass
"Geek Stink Breath"	Green Day	1995	Punk	Green Day 04	Nov 13, 2012	No	Backing vocals
"Nice Guys Finish Last"	Green Day	1997	Punk	Green Day 04	Nov 13, 2012	No	Backing vocals
"Hitchin' a Ride"	Green Day	1997	Punk	Green Day 04	Nov 13, 2012	No	Backing vocals
"Song of the Century"	Green Day	2009	Rock	21st Century Breakdown	Nov 13, 2012	No	None
"21st Century Breakdown"	Green Day	2009	Rock	21st Century Breakdown	Nov 13, 2012	No	Backing vocals
"Before the Lobotomy"	Green Day	2009	Rock	21st Century Breakdown	Nov 13, 2012	No	Backing vocals
"Last Night on Earth"	Green Day	2009	Rock	21st Century Breakdown	Nov 13, 2012	Yes	Backing vocals
"Peacemaker"	Green Day	2009	Rock	21st Century Breakdown	Nov 13, 2012	No	Backing vocals
"Murder City"	Green Day	2009	Rock	21st Century Breakdown	Nov 13, 2012	No	Backing vocals
"¿Viva la Gloria? (Little Girl)"	Green Day	2009	Rock	21st Century Breakdown	Nov 13, 2012	No	Backing vocals
"Restless Heart Syndrome"	Green Day	2009	Rock	21st Century Breakdown	Nov 13, 2012	No	Backing vocals
"Horseshoes and Handgrenades"	Green Day	2009	Rock	21st Century Breakdown	Nov 13, 2012	No	Backing vocals
"The Static Age"	Green Day	2009	Rock	21st Century Breakdown	Nov 13, 2012	No	Backing vocals
"American Eulogy"	Green Day	2009	Rock	21st Century Breakdown	Nov 13, 2012	No	Backing vocals
"See the Light"	Green Day	2009	Rock	21st Century Breakdown	Nov 13, 2012	No	Backing vocals
"American Idiot"	Green Day	2004	Rock	American Idiot	Nov 13, 2012	No	Pro Guitar/Bass
"Jesus of Suburbia"	Green Day	2004	Rock	American Idiot	Nov 13, 2012	No	Backing vocals
"Holiday"	Green Day	2004	Rock	American Idiot	Nov 13, 2012	No	Backing vocals
"Boulevard of Broken Dreams"	Green Day	2004	Rock	American Idiot	Nov 13, 2012	No	Backing vocals
"Are We the Waiting / St. Jimmy"	Green Day	2004	Rock	American Idiot	Nov 13, 2012	No	Backing vocals
"Give Me Novacaine / She's a Rebel"	Green Day	2004	Rock	American Idiot	Nov 13, 2012	Yes	Backing vocals
"Extraordinary Girl"	Green Day	2004	Rock	American Idiot	Nov 13, 2012	Yes	Backing vocals
"Letterbomb"	Green Day	2004	Rock	American Idiot	Nov 13, 2012	No	Backing vocals
"Wake Me Up When September Ends"	Green Day	2004	Rock	American Idiot	Nov 13, 2012	Yes	None
"Homecoming"	Green Day	2004	Rock	American Idiot	Nov 13, 2012	No	Backing vocals
"Whatsername"	Green Day	2004	Rock	American Idiot	Nov 13, 2012	Yes	None
"Burnout"	Green Day	1994	Punk	Dookie	Nov 13, 2012	No	Backing vocals
"Having a Blast"	Green Day	1994	Punk	Dookie	Nov 13, 2012	No	Backing vocals
"Chump"	Green Day	1994	Punk	Dookie	Nov 13, 2012	Yes	Backing vocals
"Longview"	Green Day	1994	Punk	Dookie	Nov 13, 2012	No	Backing vocals
"Welcome to Paradise"	Green Day	1994	Punk	Dookie	Nov 13, 2012	No	Backing vocals
"Pulling Teeth"	Green Day	1994	Punk	Dookie	Nov 13, 2012	No	Backing vocals
"Basket Case"	Green Day	1994	Punk	Dookie	Nov 13, 2012	No	Backing vocals
"She"	Green Day	1994	Punk	Dookie	Nov 13, 2012	No	Backing vocals
"Sassafras Roots"	Green Day	1994	Punk	Dookie	Nov 13, 2012	No	Backing vocals
"When I Come Around"	Green Day	1994	Punk	Dookie	Nov 13, 2012	No	Backing vocals & Pro Guitar/Bass
"Coming Clean"	Green Day	1994	Punk	Dookie	Nov 13, 2012	Yes	None
"Emenius Sleepus"	Green Day	1994	Punk	Dookie	Nov 13, 2012	Yes	Backing vocals
"In the End"	Green Day	1994	Punk	Dookie	Nov 13, 2012	No	Backing vocals
"F.O.D."	Green Day	1994	Punk	Dookie	Nov 13, 2012	No	Backing vocals
"Jessica"	The Allman Brothers Band	1973	Southern Rock	Single	Nov 20, 2012	Yes	Core & Pro Guitar/Bass
"The Weight (Live)"	The Band	1972	Classic Rock	Single	Nov 20, 2012	Yes	Core & Pro Guitar/Bass
"Cold"	Crossfade	2004	Rock	Single	Nov 20, 2012	No	Core
"Cry Thunder"	DragonForce	2012	Metal	Single	Nov 20, 2012	Yes	Core
"I Melt With You"	Modern English	1982	New Wave	Single	Nov 20, 2012	Yes	Core
"Closer"	Nine Inch Nails	1994	Rock	Single	Nov 20, 2012	No	Core
"Call Me Maybe"	Carly Rae Jepsen	2012	Pop/Dance/Electronic	Single	Nov 27, 2012	Yes	Core
"Sex and Candy"	Marcy Playground	1997	Alternative	Single	Nov 27, 2012	No	Core & Pro Guitar/Bass
"She Talks to Angels"	The Black Crowes	1990	Southern Rock	The Black Crowes 01	Dec 4, 2012	Yes	Core & Pro Guitar/Bass
"Remedy"	The Black Crowes	1992	Southern Rock	The Black Crowes 01	Dec 4, 2012	No	Core
"Sometimes Salvation"	The Black Crowes	1992	Southern Rock	The Black Crowes 01	Dec 4, 2012	No	Core
"Possum Kingdom"	Toadies	1994	Grunge	Toadies 01	Dec 11, 2012	No	Core & Pro Guitar/Bass
"Away"	Toadies	1994	Grunge	Toadies 01	Dec 11, 2012	Yes	Core
"Tyler"	Toadies	1994	Grunge	Toadies 01	Dec 11, 2012	No	Core
"The Bitch Is Back"	Elton John	1974	Classic Rock	Elton John 01	Dec 18, 2012	No	Core
"Don't Let the Sun Go Down on Me"	Elton John	1974	Classic Rock	Elton John 01	Dec 18, 2012	Yes	Core
"I'm Still Standing" (Note: Songs are also available as imports from Rock Band Blitz.)	Elton John	1983	Classic Rock	Elton John 01	Dec 18, 2012	Yes	Core
"Helena"	My Chemical Romance	2004	Emo	My Chemical Romance 01	Dec 25, 2012	Yes	Core
"Teenagers"	My Chemical Romance	2006	Emo	My Chemical Romance 01	Dec 25, 2012	No	Core & Pro Guitar/Bass
"Sing"	My Chemical Romance	2010	Emo	My Chemical Romance 01	Dec 25, 2012	Yes	Core
"Party Hard"	Andrew W.K.	2001	Rock	Single	Dec 30, 2012	Yes	Core
"Tonight Tonight"	Hot Chelle Rae	2011	Pop/Dance/Electronic	Single	Dec 30, 2012	Yes	Core
"We Are Young"	fun. ft. Janelle Monáe	2012	Pop-Rock	Single	Dec 30, 2012	No	Core
"Raise Your Glass"	P!nk	2010	Pop-Rock	Single	Dec 30, 2012	No	Core
