= Possum Kingdom (disambiguation) =

Possum Kingdom or Possum Kingdom Lake is a reservoir in Palo Pinto County, Texas.

Possum Kingdom may also refer to:

- "Possum Kingdom" (song), a 1994 song by the Toadies
- Possum Kingdom State Park, a Texas state park including the lake
- Possum Kingdom Airport, an airport in Palo Pinto County, Texas, United States
