= Heretics (album) =

Studio album by Toadies
- Released: September 18, 2015
- Genres: Alternative rock, grunge, punk rock
- Length: 53:16
- Label: Kirtland
- Producer: Rob Schnapf

Toadies chronology
Play.Rock.Music (2012)	Heretics (2015)	The Lower Side of Uptown (2017)

Heretics is the sixth studio album by the alternative rock band Toadies. It was released in September 2015 by independent record label Kirtland Records. The studio album "re-imagines and reinterprets" several of the band's previously released songs, including the band's most popular single, "Possum Kingdom". The album also features two new songs and a cover of Blondie's 1979 hit single "Heart of Glass".

== Track listing ==
No.	Title	Length
1.	"In the Belly of a Whale" (original song)	3:50
2.	"Tyler" (new arrangement; originally featured on Rubberneck)	4:06
3.	"Beside You" (new arrangement; originally featured on Play.Rock.Music)	4:15
4.	"Queen of Scars" (original song)	3:03
5.	"Rattler's Revival" (new arrangement; originally featured on Play.Rock.Music)	4:13
6.	"Heart of Glass" (Blondie cover)	3:02
7.	"Possum Kingdom" (new arrangement; originally featured on Rubberneck)	5:54
8.	"The Appeal" (new arrangement; originally featured on Play.Rock.Music)	5:46
9.	"Dollskin" (new arrangement; originally featured on Hell Below/Stars Above)	4:48
10.	"Backslider" (new arrangement; originally featured on Rubberneck)	2:35
11.	"Jigsaw Girl" (new arrangement; originally featured on Hell Below/Stars Above)	5:24
12.	"Send You to Heaven" (previously unreleased track; originally written for Feeler)	6:20

== Personnel ==
- Vaden Todd Lewis – lead vocals, guitar, mandolin
- Clark Vogeler – guitar, backing vocals, piano, mellotron, modular synthesizer
- Doni Blair – bass, percussion
- Mark Reznicek – drums, percussion
