= Dig a Hole / I Hope You Die =

"Dig a Hole” / “I Hope You Die"

Single by Toadies
- A-side: "Dig a Hole"
- B-side: "I Hope You Die"
- Released: November 1, 1990
- Recorded: Crystal Clear Sound, Dallas
- Genre: Grunge
- Length: 8:35
- Songwriter: Todd Lewis
- Producer: Todd Lewis

Toadies singles chronology
"Dig a Hole" / "I Hope You Die" (1990)	"Mister Love" (1993)

"Dig a Hole" / "I Hope You Die" is a cassette single self-released by the Toadies on November 1, 1990, on an IEC Type I compact cassette tape sold exclusively at the Camp Bowie Sound Warehouse in Fort Worth and at live shows between 1990 and 1992. Of all the Toadies material, this release displays the strongest Pixies resemblance, with David Lovering remarking after he heard "Dig a Hole" that, "It sounds like us!" The song is built on a simple recurring bass line and power chords and contains the memorable line, "Like pervert's words, I'm strung together/to make some pervert God feel better."

The song was written as a response to Todd Lewis's distaste for what was then the most popular style in the Fort Worth-Dallas region. ″There was a huge movement of Edie Brickell-barefoot-hippie music. It's kind of making a resurgence now, and man, I hate that stuff. So that gave us something that worked up a lot of good bile. We made our first tape to get out of Fort Worth and into Dallas when all that was going on, and we wrote this song—one of our more mature efforts—called 'I Hope You Die.' And the refrain at the end of the song was 'D-I-E E-D-I-E.' I don't think anybody got it″

Produced by Todd Lewis. Engineered by Keith Rust at Crystal Clear Sound, Dallas, Texas. Songs © Todd Lewis. Cover illustration by Dan Lightner. Sleeve design by Caren Lane. Some copies of this cassette were affixed with hand-cut stickers featuring two contact telephone numbers for booking purposes.

== Track listing ==
1. "Dig a Hole" (Lewis) - 3:22
2. "I Hope You Die" (Lewis) - 5:13

== Personnel ==
- Todd Lewis – vocals, guitar
- Charles Mooney III – guitar
- Lisa Umbarger – bass
- Michael Jerome Moore – drums
