= Possum Kingdom State Park =

State park in Texas, United States

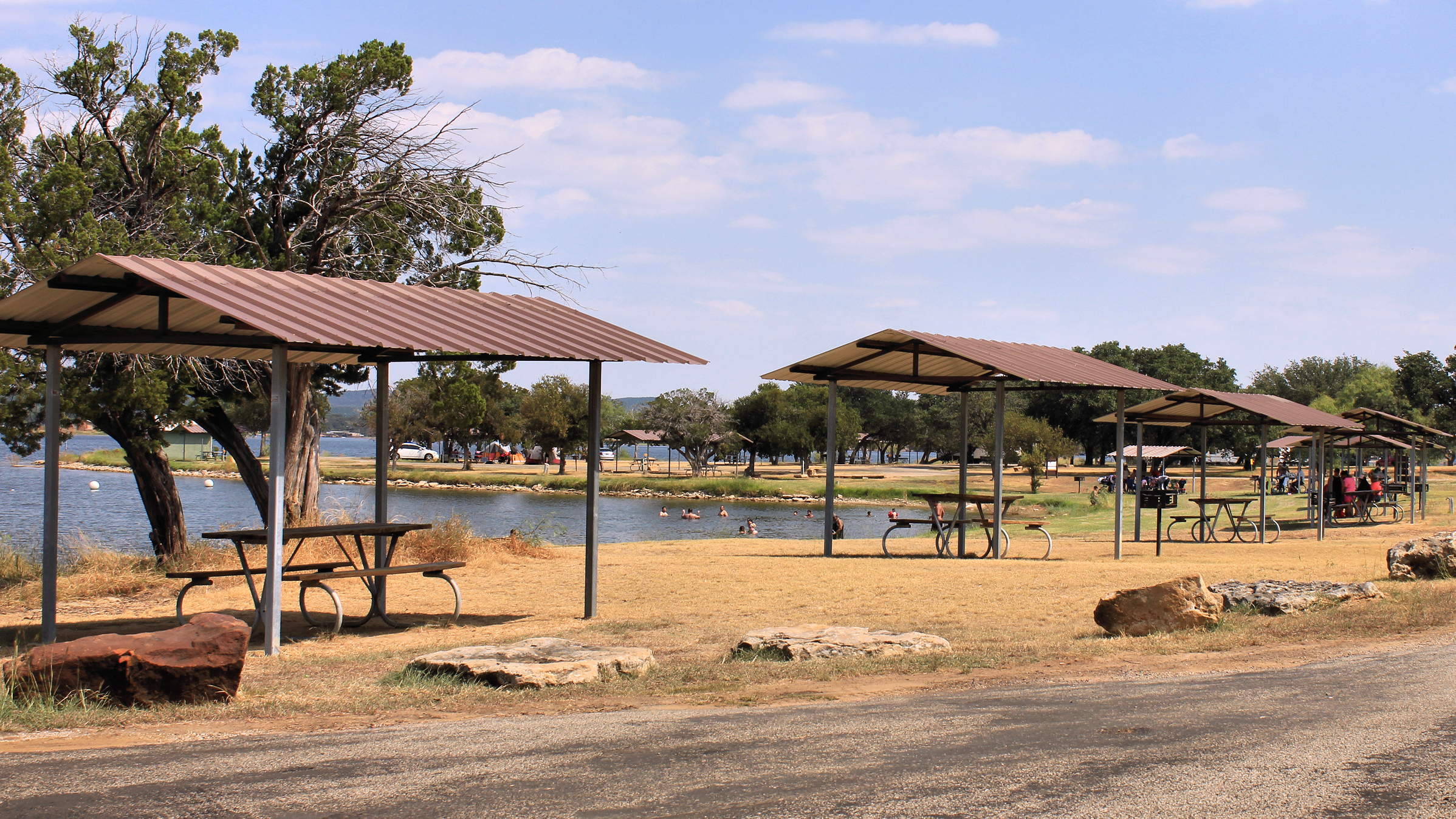
- Picnic and swimming area

- Location within Texas Location within the United States
- Location: Palo Pinto County, Texas
- Nearest city: Caddo
- Coordinates: 32°52′10″N 98°33′40″W
- Area: 1,528.7 acres (6.186 km^{2})
- Established: 1940
- Visitors: 68,068 (in 2022)
- Governing body: Texas Parks and Wildlife Department

Possum Kingdom State Park is a state park in Palo Pinto County, Texas, USA, that was built in the 1940s by Civilian Conservation Corps Company 2888 and opened to the public in 1950. It covers approximately 1,530 acres (620 ha), and lies in the Palo Pinto Mountains and Brazos River Valley of Texas. The park borders the large Possum Kingdom Lake, a 20,000-acre (8,100 ha) lake known for its clear blue waters. Possum Kingdom winds for 65 miles (105 km) down the Brazos River, and has more than 300 miles (480 km) of shoreline. A privately owned store and marina in the park cater to boaters and campers.

The Boy Scouts of America have a summer camp "Constantin" on the shores of Possum Kingdom Lake as does the YMCA at camp "Grady Spruce".

Camp Grady Spruce is directly across from the most well known geological feature of the lake called "Hell's Gate", a channel which cuts between an island and a row of cliffs.

The title of the song "Possum Kingdom" by Toadies is derived from Possum Kingdom State Park.

On April 15, 2011, the park was closed due to wildfires, and was reopened on May 25, 2011.

Due to Texas' severe drought, another breakout of wildfires that began on August 30, 2011, plagued the Possum Kingdom Lake area. The fires burned into September, and though the park was not damaged, 39 homes and 9 recreation vehicles were destroyed.
