= Rock Show =

Rock Show may refer to:

- "Venus and Mars/Rock Show", a 1975 song by Paul McCartney & Wings
- Rockshow, a 1980 concert film by Paul McCartney & Wings
- "Rock Show", a song by Run–D.M.C. from their 2001 album, Crown Royal
- "The Rock Show", a song by Blink-182 from their 2001 album Take Off Your Pants and Jacket
- "Rock Show" (Peaches song), 2000
- "Rock Show" (Grinspoon song), 1999
- Rock Show (album), a 2007 live album by Toadies
- Rock Show consortium, owners of the Planet Rock (radio station)
- "Rock Show" (Parks and Recreation), the 2009 first season finale of NBC's Parks and Recreation
- The Rock Show (Jon English album), a musical theatre production that starred Jon English.
