= Pleather (album) =

EP by Toadies
- Released: May 18, 1993
- Studios: Crystal Clear Sound, Dallas, Texas
- Genre: Grunge
- Length: 24:01
- Label: Grass

Toadies chronology
Velvet (1992)	Pleather (1993)	Rubberneck (1994)

Alternative Cover
- Pleather cover from 1997 Interscope re-release.

Professional ratings
Review scores
Source	Rating
Allmusic	link

Pleather is the third EP by American rock band Toadies, released in 1993 on Grass Records. It gained the attention of Interscope Records who signed the band and released their first studio album, Rubberneck, in 1994. Interscope re-released Pleather on June 17, 1997.

== Track listing ==
All tracks are written by Todd Lewis, except where noted.

No.	Title	Writer(s)	Length
1.	"Mister Love"		2:53
2.	"Got a Heart"		3:16
3.	"Ruth"	Lewis, Reznicek, Sauerwein	3:05
4.	"Happy Face"	Lewis, Herbert	3:01
5.	"Possum Kingdom"		4:56
6.	"I Burn" (hidden track (Note: Appended to the end of track 5 after 1:33 of silence, bringing track 5 to a total length of 11:46.))		5:17
Total length:			24:01

== Personnel ==
Toadies

- Todd Lewis – vocals
- Charles Mooney III – guitar
- Lisa Umbarger – bass
- Mark Reznicek – drums
- Darrel Herbert – guitar

Additional

- Tracey Sauerwein – guitar (tracks 2 and 5)
- Keith Rust – engineer
- David Gibson – cover art
