= The Backsliders (Texas band) =

THe BAcksliders
- Origin: Dallas, Texas
- Genres: Rock, power pop, classic rock
- Years active: 2005–present
- Labels: Unsigned
- Members: Kim Bonner; Chris Bonner; Jason Bonner; Taylor Young; Nathan Adamson
- Past members: Nolan Theis
- Website: http://www.thebacksliders.com/

The Backsliders (often capitalised as THe BAcksliders) is a rock and roll band from Dallas, Texas.

Formed in late 2005, The Backsliders released a self-titled full-length album in March 2006, a 7" released December 2006, a DVD "Live at The Double Wide" in May 2007, and the album "You're Welcome" on June 3, 2008. The 7", DVD and the record "You're Welcome" feature Kim Bonner (then Pendleton) on Vocals, Chris Bonner guitar, Nolan Theis (Deep Blue Something, Five Times August) on bass and Taylor Young (Young Heart Attack, Polyphonic Spree) on drums. The self-titled full length is the same line up but with Nathan Adamson on drums. "You're Welcome" was produced by Jeff Halbert (St. Vincent, The Lemurs).

The Backsliders won "best blues" award from the Dallas Observer in 2007. Kim Bonner (née Pendleton) (formerly of Polygram recording artist Vibrolux) and husband Chris Bonner (Sons of Sound) form the core of the group, with other notable Dallas musicians as regular members. Brother R. Jason Bonner became the bass player in February 2008. On July 22, 2008, The BAcksliders won "Best Hard Rock" award in the 20th annual Dallas Observer Music Awards. They performed with, amongst others, The Toadies at the first annual Dia De Los Toadies on August 31, 2008. The BAcksliders released the album "Thank You" as a free download via www.thebacksliders.com in July 2009. The studio album "...from Dallas, Texas," will be released on April 19, 2011. "...from Dallas, Texas" was produced by Chris Bonner and Nathan Adamson, and includes Earl Darling on drums, and Nathan Adamson on drums and keyboards.

== Members ==
=== Current members ===
- Kim Bonner (née Pendleton) – Vocals
- Chris Bonner – Guitar
- Jason Bonner – Bass
- Taylor Young – Drums
- Nathan Adamson – Keyboards

=== Former members ===
- Nolan Theis – Bass

== Discography ==
=== Albums ===
- "THe BAcksliders" (2006)
- "You're Welcome" (2008)
- "Thank You" (2009)
- "...from Dallas, Texas" (2011)

=== EPs ===
- "Cry/I Got Mine"(7") (2006)

=== DVDs ===
"Live at The Double Wide"

=== Other ===
- "XO For the Holidays vol 2" – various artists – track No. 3 – "Christmas (Doesn't Have To Be So bad)" (2009)
