= Hell Below/Stars Above =

Studio album by Toadies
- Released: March 20, 2001
- Recorded: January 3 – March 18, 2000
- Studios: Sunset Sound Recorders, Hollywood, Los Angeles, California
- Genres: Grunge; alternative rock; hard rock; punk rock
- Length: 44:56
- Label: Interscope
- Producers: Tom Rothrock; Rob Schnapf

Toadies chronology
Rubberneck (1994)	Hell Below/Stars Above (2001)	Best of Toadies: Live from Paradise (2002)

Singles from Hell Below/Stars Above
- 1. "Push the Hand" Released: February 2001

Hell Below/Stars Above is the second studio album by American rock band Toadies, released on March 20, 2001 by Interscope Records. It is the first Toadies album to feature lead guitarist Clark Vogeler, who joined in 1996, and the band's final album with founding member and bassist Lisa Umbarger. The album was the Toadies' first in nearly seven years, and was their second attempt at recording a follow-up to their platinum-selling debut Rubberneck (1994); the band's first attempt, Feeler, had been rejected by Interscope in 1998.

Hell Below/Stars Above was produced by Tom Rothrock and Rob Schnapf and was recorded at Sunset Sound Recorders in Los Angeles, California between January and March 2000. Disagreements with Interscope delayed the album's release for an entire year after its completion. Unlike earlier Toadies' releases, Hell Below/Stars Above was jointly written by all of the band's members instead of by frontman Vaden Todd Lewis only, resulting in it becoming more stylistically varied. The album's overall sound was influenced by 1970s rock music, and was cleaner and less aggressive than the grunge-informed Rubberneck.

Hell Below/Stars Above received mixed reviews from critics and was a significant commercial failure upon release, with the album only reaching number 130 on the Billboard 200 chart and selling less than a tenth of Rubberneck's sales, primarily due to Interscope's complete lack of promotional support for the album. Disillusioned with the album's failure, Umbarger quit the Toadies four months after its release, resulting in the group's disbandment in October 2001. It was the Toadies' last album prior to their reformation in 2006.

== Background ==
In 1994, the Toadies released their debut album Rubberneck. Propelled by the hit single "Possum Kingdom" and the band's relentless touring schedules, the album was certified Platinum by the Recording Industry Association of America (RIAA) in 1996. Touring for the album wrapped up in September 1996, after which the band fired lead guitarist Darrel Herbert, who no longer wanted to tour. After auditioning several guitarists in late 1996, the band settled on Clark Vogeler of the alternative rock band Funland, which had broken up earlier in June.

After writing and rehearsing new material throughout 1997, the Toadies recorded a new album, later known as Feeler, in Austin, Texas with producer Paul Leary (of the Butthole Surfers) between January and April 1998. The band recorded 14 songs for the album, which was envisioned as an attempt to make "a more mature record" than Rubberneck. Dissatisfied with the album's material, the Toadies' record label, Interscope Records, forced the band to make adjustments to Feeler; this protracted its recording process, and the band missed their scheduled time to have the album mixed by Andy Wallace as a result. Whilst waiting for someone to mix the album, the Toadies wrote and/or included five more songs for consideration on the album, and its release date was moved back from late summer of 1998 to around early 1999. Ultimately, the band ended up handing Feeler over to Interscope in an unmixed and unmastered state; the label then withheld the album from release, unhappy with its perceived change in sound.

After the album's rejection, the Toadies decided to scrap Feeler entirely, feeling unhappy with its "mechanical" production. The band then went on a month-long hiatus after facing writer's block and rumours that they were going to have a sophomore slump, with the band's frontman Vaden Todd Lewis going into a self-imposed exile. Todd Lewis eventually decided to get the band back together again, and they began playing some local shows. The Toadies would begin to face numerous difficulties during this time, financially and legally; the band's former manager, Tom Bunch (who was fired in December 1998) and Darrel Herbert jointly sued the band in 1999 after claiming continued royalties and unpaid management fees; the lawsuits would be settled in June 2001. The band were also nearly dropped by Interscope following the merger of Interscope's parent company, Universal Music Group, with PolyGram in December 1998; many Texan acts, including The Reverend Horton Heat and Tripping Daisy, were dropped from their labels during the merger, and the Toadies' perceived inactivity left their future at Interscope uncertain. The band was able to stay on the label, as the person who was supposed to drop the band was fired during the merger, and because Todd Lewis was able to convince Interscope's new president, Tom Whalley, to keep them on the label.

== Writing and recording ==
Whilst Todd Lewis was still living in Austin, the rest of the Toadies began writing new material together in Dallas. After hearing and being impressed by the band's demos, which consisted of early versions of "Motivational" and "You'll Come Down" (along with an unreleased song, "Trust Game"), Todd Lewis started writing songs collaboratively with the rest of the band; this marked a change from the band's prior output, which was solely written by Todd Lewis. Todd Lewis and Mark Reznicek described the songwriting process of Hell Below/Stars Above as "finishing each other's sentences", with Todd Lewis presenting an idea that the rest of the band would flesh out. "We'd had enough time together as a band--me and Mark and Lisa--to start vibing that way, and kind of feeding off each other." In spite of his status as the band's newest member, Vogeler quickly became an equal part in the song writing process. Writing and demoing of new material continued until days before the Toadies headed out to Sunset Sound Recorders in Hollywood, California to begin recording the album in January 2000. The new approach to songwriting proved to be extremely productive for the band; by January 2000, they had been able to write 40 brand new songs.

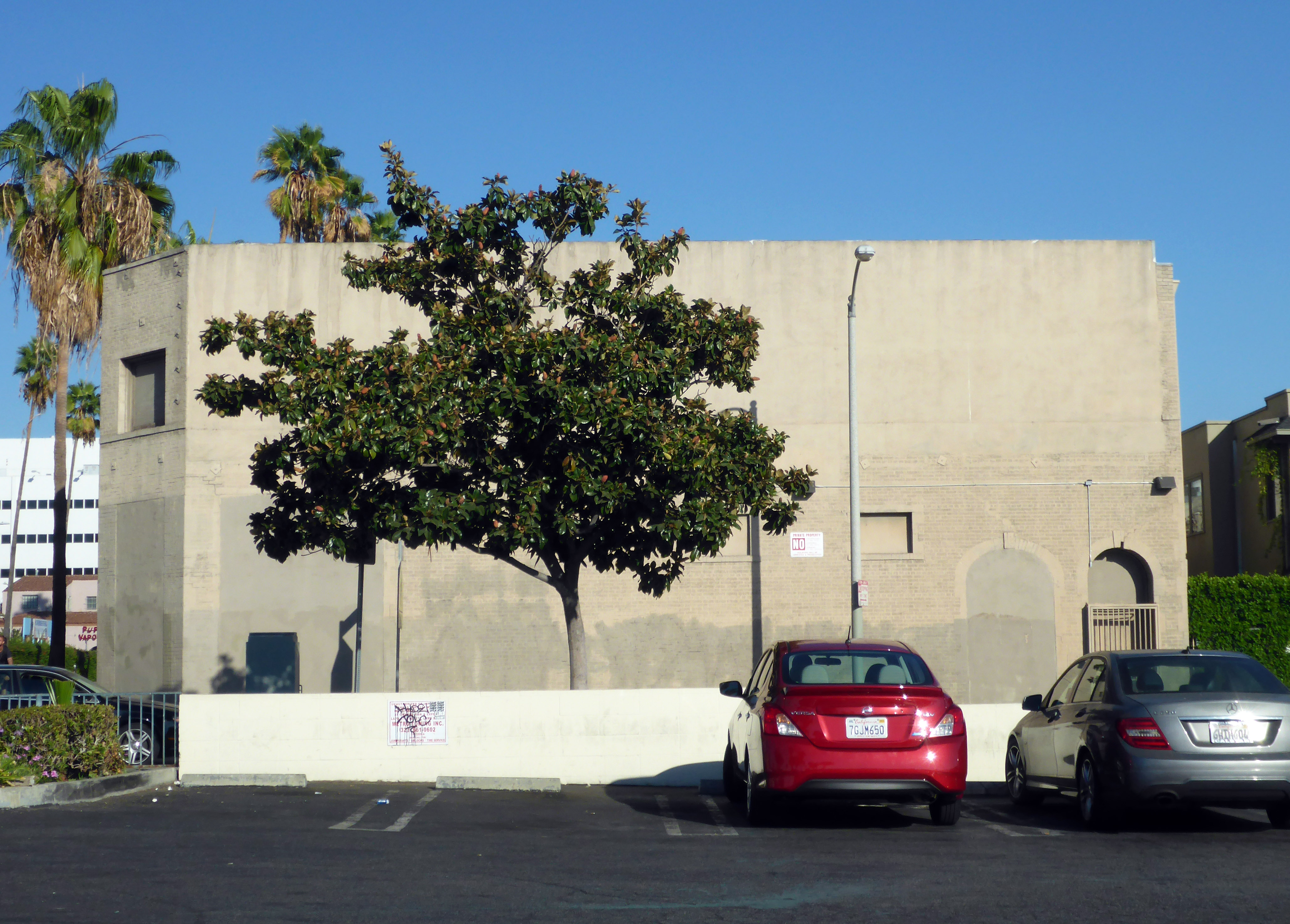
Hell Below/Stars Above was recorded at Sunset Sound Recorders (pictured).

After initially being scheduled to start recording in November 1999, the band entered Sunset Sound Recorders on January 3, 2000. The studio, which Clark Vogeler referred to as "a classic studio", had been used by many influential rock acts from the 1970s such as the Rolling Stones and Led Zeppelin, and its history became an influence on the overall sound of Hell Below/Stars Above, which Todd Lewis described as "a little grander sounding, [and] a little more '70s, I guess." The band opted to work again with Rubberneck producers Tom Rothrock and Rob Schnapf again, favouring their "full" production style. The band aimed for a sound that was "a little bit more live, [and] not quite so mechanical" as the Pro-Tools produced Feeler sessions; in order to achieve this sound, the album was recorded onto two-inch analog tape. Three songs from the Feeler sessions, "Push the Hand", "Doll Skin" and "Best of Three" (retitled "What We Have We Steal"), were recovered and re-recorded for the album, while two other songs, "Joey Let’s Go" and "Waterfall" were also re-recorded but did not make the final album.

The recording sessions for Hell Below/Stars Above were sometimes difficult and stop-start; notably, recording was halted for two weeks when the album was nearly complete after Interscope told the band that the album's budget still needed to be approved. Furthermore, the band, still in financial difficulties as a result of not doing a major tour for several years, relied on royalties coming from Rubberneck to keep them afloat; Todd Lewis called "Possum Kingdom", which was still receiving somewhat regular radio rotation several years after its release, the "pay-the-rent" song for the band. In order to make up for the lack of touring money, Lisa Umbarger took on a part-time role working for Starbucks, and Clark Vogeler reluctantly had to borrow money from his girlfriend for basic necessities such as toilet paper and food. Recording was completed on March 18, 2000, and the album was mixed by Andy Wallace in April and mastered by Howie Weinberg in May of that year.

== Composition and lyrics ==
"The main thing is that after The Feeler Sessions, we just kept writing instead of giving up and going, 'This isn't going to happen.' We did the thing we did best; we just went in and kept working. And we did a lot of things [on Hell Below/Stars Above] that we've never done before, things we would've considered a risk before. But after all those things had happened to us, who cared? We were ready to gamble."

— Lisa Umbarger on the album's writing and recording process.

Hell Below/Stars Above has been described as grunge, alternative rock, hard rock, punk rock, post-grunge, heavy metal and rock 'n' roll. While mostly consisting of heavy rock songs, several tracks feature a more emotional, softer-sound, including "Pressed Against the Sky" and "Doll Skin". Todd Lewis called "Pressed Against the Sky" "really on-your-sleeve and emotionally bare [and] not trying to hide behind a scary story", and cited the song as evidence of his matured song writing abilities. "Since Rubberneck, I’ve been trying to express myself without relying on some story to hide what I’m really getting at." Hell Below/Stars Above also saw the band experimenting with a variety of instruments, techniques and ideas, including using vocal harmonies, tambourines and piano on several of the album's tracks. The intro sound on "Doll Skin" was created by Todd Lewis knocking a wooden hammer into the body of his guitar, emulating tambour. Despite the fact the musical landscape had changed in the years following the release of Rubberneck, the band was not interested copying modern musical trends or the album. "The charm of this record is that we don’t fit in," Todd Lewis said to Pause And Play, "especially now with all the backwards-hats-wearing, scream-at-the-floor guys. It might be refreshing to hear somebody who can write a song and not be playing one chord on a seven-string guitar, screaming about their childhood. That’s what’s going to work with this record … there’s people actually singing and not being tuned by a computer and actually playing their instruments and actually writing a song. It has some merit to it, some hooks. It’s something to sing along to."

The album's penultimate track, "Hell Below/Stars Above", best presents the album's creative visions. The song showcases a progressive song structure, starting off as a straight forward fast rock song before expanding into a more bluesy song with a gospel choir and piano at the end. Todd Lewis wrote the first half of the song, with the rest of the band contributing something to the end of the song afterwards. The song also includes piano performed by Elliott Smith, who had worked with Rothrock and Schnapf in the past. The band had never played it in full before entering the studio, and said it "took on a new life" when recorded. The song was originally recorded with backup singers who had previously worked with Stevie Nicks, but the band scrapped the idea after the vocals were recorded; instead, they brought in a single backup female singer. Despite the song's complex structure, the band said it was the easiest song to write for the album, with "What We Have Is What We Steal", "Push The Hand" and "Jigsaw Girl" being described as the hardest songs to write.

The lyrical content on Hell Below/Stars Above covers themes such as sex, relationships, murder, religion, and was partially inspired by the struggles the band faced. "Push the Hand" was described by Todd Lewis to be about "a relationship that gets fouled up because of sex, and about seeing how your friendship kinda goes away because you f---ed it up by, um ... f---ing." "Heel" is about Todd Lewis' dog, and heavily uses double entendre. "Jigsaw Girl" was described by MTV News as "a dark, romantic ode to a former lover the narrator has chopped to pieces." Todd Lewis described the song as "the prettiest song ever, but it's about how you love this girl so much, but she doesn't love you back, so you cut her up." "I think it's fun to pull off a love song that's really f---in' twisted," Lewis said about the song to MTV News. "It's funny to hear a love song about something really dark and sick that still sounds nice and pretty." The Austin Chronicle compared the song to "Possum Kingdom".

== Artwork ==
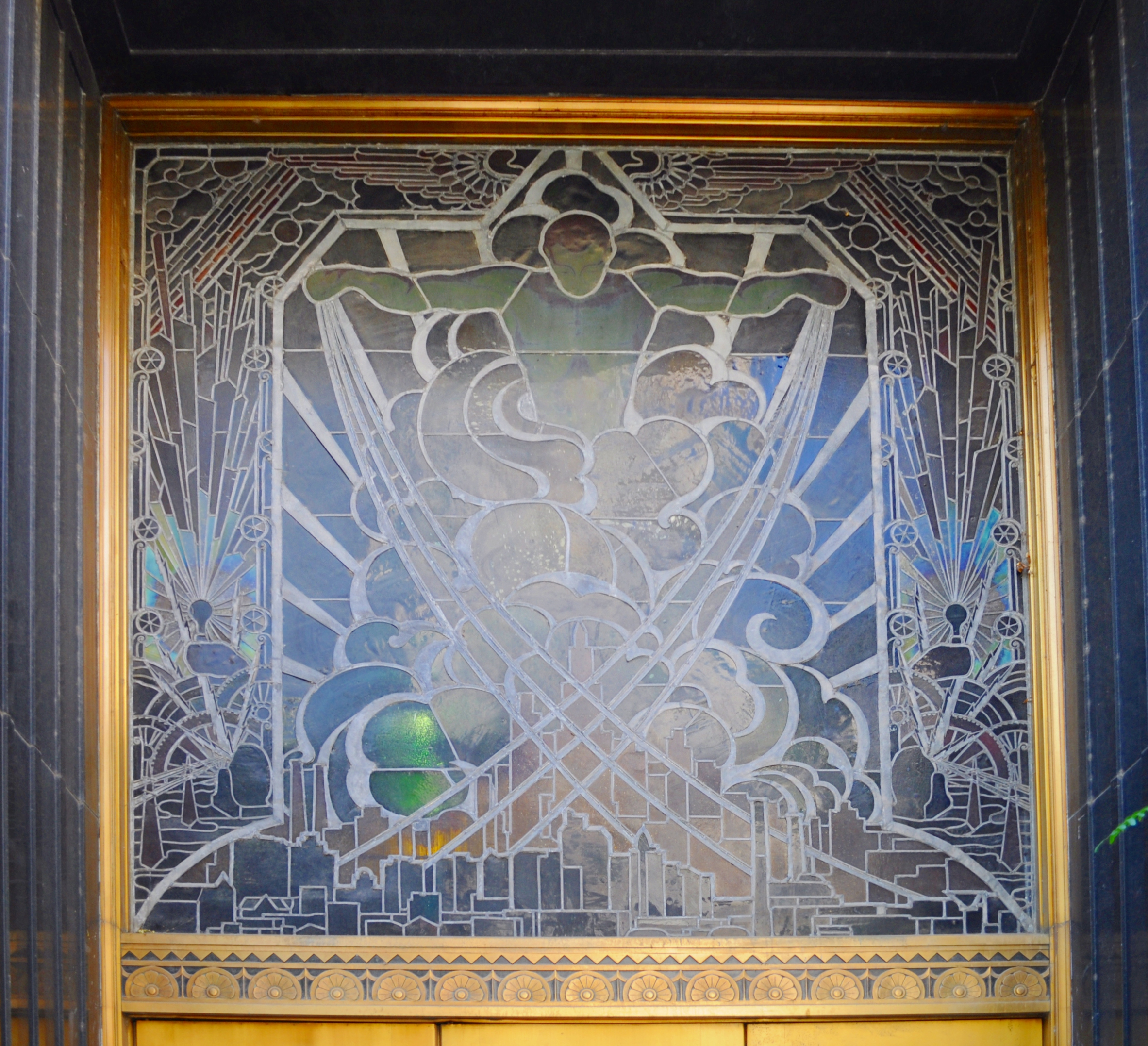
The stained glass window on the Dallas Power and Light building, used for the album's disc and inner tray artwork.

The album's cover is a picture of an angel, and was taken from the 1996 book Pillars of the Almighty by f-stop Fitzgerald and Ken Follett, a book which contains photography of churches and buildings. The band used the image to form the rest of the album's aesthetic. The disc artwork and the inner tray card is an image of a stained-glass window taken from the Dallas Power and Light building. The artwork inside the fold-out liner notes contain an enlarged image of the front cover, with a combination of various words from the album's lyrics running through the middle.

== Release and promotion ==
Hell Below/Stars Above was not immediately given a release date after it was turned into the label, and a waiting game that the band described as "frustrating" and "fucking depressing" ensued. The band originally aimed for a release date of August/September 2000, however, this was not doable. Interscope's president, Tom Whalley, wanted to release the album in October 2000, but the band refused as they did not want the album to compete with releases from bigger rock acts such as U2 (All That You Can't Leave Behind) and Marilyn Manson (Holy Wood) around the same time. The album's release date was then moved to February 13, 2001, but the label eventually moved its release to March 6, and finally, to March 20, 2001, possibly to avoid competition with Big Dumb Face's Duke Lion Fights the Terror!!!. It was released exclusively in North America. Despite the near seven-year gap between releases, the band was not worried about the scale of the record's initial success, and believed it would become successful overtime; Rubberneck had only become successful a year after its release. Interscope shipped 70,000 copies of the album to stores.

The first song to be released from Hell Below/Stars Above was "Heel", which appeared on Sampler 2000, a promotional sampler released by Interscope during the Vans Warped Tour. It was initially planned that the album's intended first single, "Motivational", was to be released in mid-December, but following the album's delay to March 2001 it was pushed back to February. At the last minute, the album's first single was changed to "Push The Hand" thanks to a fan poll on the band's website. The single was released in late February 2001. It was added to 48 radio stations upon its release, and reached number 30 on Billboard's Active Rock Chart.

=== Label promotion ===
Interscope's promotion of the album was extremely poor, compared to the label's promotion of Rubberneck. Whereas Rubberneck was promoted with several music videos and radio singles, the label only released one single, and no music videos. The album's only single, "Push the Hand", was promoted for two weeks on the radio, which was "the minimal amount they were legally required to do", according to drummer Mark Reznicek. Todd Lewis suggested that a follow-up single could have been either "You’ll Come Down" or "Motivational", but soon after, Interscope informed the band that they would not be releasing a second single or promoting the album further. "We were like a paper boat in a gutter," Umbarger explained of the album's poor promotion; "from the street to the sewer."

In a 2012 interview with Antiquiet, Clark Vogeler said the band believed Hell Below/Stars Above was poorly promoted because of a falling out with Interscope Records founder Jimmy Iovine, stemming from a joke the band made about Interscope on a radio station in 1994, which offended him. "He was mad at them [in 1994], and by the time it was time for us to start working on our second record, he was in control, and [then-Interscope President] Tom Whalley I think was on his way out, so Jimmy Iovine just made the decision, [to] just kind of, 'fuck ’em'." He also blamed Iovine for the album's seven-year delay; "He never seemed to forgive [the band], basically, and squandered away years and years of our lives."

=== 20th anniversary reissue ===
The band announced a 20th anniversary vinyl reissue of the album on March 24, 2021. A release date is unknown as of November 2022.

== Reception ==
=== Critical reception ===
Professional ratings
Review scores
Source	Rating
AllMusic	2.5/5 stars
The Austin Chronicle	4/5 stars
The Encyclopedia of Popular Music	3/5 stars
Wall of Sound	77/100

Upon its release, Hell Below/Stars Above received generally mixed reviews from critics.

Several critics praised the album for its energy. In a positive review from Texas Monthly, Andy Langer commented: "Time and familiarity haven’t dulled the punch of the Toadies’ creepy narratives, muscular hooks, and unfettered aggression". While he said that the album's songs, bar the title track, were "business-as-usual", he concluded that "time may not have made them a different band, but Hell Below/Stars Above proves it has made them a better one." There was also some praise directed towards the album's heavier sound. Writing for Allmusic, Mark Morgenstein remarked that "If 1995's Rubberneck was a pretty heavy album, with guitars swimming in a post-grunge murk, Hell Below/Stars Above finds the band trudging through primeval sludge, awakening the ghosts of heavy metal past", and that "Hell Below/Stars Above isn't all that original, but it's nirvana to some headbangers in an era when rap-metal was the only metal played on the radio." Chris Molanphy of CMJ New Music Monthly similarly called the album "a pulverizing comeback" and commented "What puts the Toadies over [its grunge peers] isn't the player's chops so much as their range– few bands successfully mix turgid and tense as they do, disdaining solos and remaining heavy."

Most of the album's criticism was largely directed towards the quality of the band's song writing and production, many who called it unoriginal and outdated. In a negative review of the album, Orlando Weekly called the album a "bare-bones effort" and inferior to Rubberneck: "The hooks are weak, the guitars mushy, and the songs are unremarkable. "You'll Come Down" and "Jigsaw Girl" stand out, but none of the tracks has the power of "Tyler," dooming the disc to a hitless existence." Similarly, PopMatters criticized the album's "weak" songwriting, and dismissed the Toadies as "a cheap xerox copy of Collective Soul. And, considering Soul doesn’t have much of an identity to call its own, the band is more akin to being a copy of a copy: kinda faint and hard to see without a lot of squinting." The GW Hatchet was critical of the album's lyrics, labeling the album "sadistic rock". Several reviewers criticized Todd Lewis's vocal performance, which were described as "strained at best" and an "adenoidal whine"; The GW Hatchet described his vocals as "loud yelps between verses that are eerily reminiscent of fingernails on a black board".

In 2010, the Dallas Observer listed Hell Below/Stars Above as one of the best Dallas albums of the 2000s. In 2022, Ultimate Guitar ranked the album at number 9 on its list of the "Top 10 Grunge Albums That Survived the '00s".

=== Commercial performance ===
Hell Below/Stars Above became a commercial disaster for the band. In the US, the album debuted at number 130 on the Billboard 200 chart and fell off the chart the week after. Six months after the album's release, the album had sold 54,432 copies in the US, and only 6,260 copies sold in the band's Texas home state. By January 2002, the album had sold a meagre 61,000 copies, which was ninety-four percent less than Rubberneck's million-copy sales. The album made an appearance on MTV News' "2001's Biggest Flops", who called the album "the biggest sales fiasco of the year".

The Toadies were shocked and disappointed with Hell Below/Stars Above's poor commercial performance, with Todd Lewis blaming Interscope's lacklustre promotion for the album's low sales. "The label was doing the usual label thing: 'If you don't sell X number within X number of days, then you suck.' Especially these days; it's just so competitive. So that didn't help, I'm sure. But, you know, that would have gotten better eventually, or we would've done another record and it would have gotten better then. I really believe in this record. That's the shame of it. I was really looking forward to getting out and beating people over the head with it, to convince them how good it is, because I really, really believe in this record."

== Touring and aftermath ==
Without any touring support from Interscope, the band promoted the album with the band's first major headlining tour since 1997, The "I Am A Tour" Tour, travelling to various cities across the United States with supporting acts Elliott, Warren Peace, Diffuser and Enon. The band made the conscious decision to travel to "secondary markets" and less-commonly toured locations such as Lubbock, Texas. The band also participated in the South by Southwest music festival in Austin, Texas prior to the album's release on March 17, 2001 and in the two-day CPR Fest in Biloxi, Mississippi, where they performed alongside Live, Filter, Rollins Band, Danzig, Tracy Bonham, and 3 Doors Down. One of the band's shows during the tour, at the Paradise Rock Club, Boston, was recorded and posthumously released as a live album, titled Best of Toadies: Live from Paradise, in November 2002. The band's shows were much smaller than Rubberneck's, and some fans had not even heard about the album a month after the record's release. Demoralised and disappointed with the album's failure, the band member's relationships became increasingly strained.

=== Breakup of the Toadies ===
"I had a conversation with someone at the label, an insider who shall remain nameless, and found out they had no intention of doing anything else for the record... When I found out they weren't going to do another single, that it was going to sit there, it looked gloomy, and I have things that looked brighter. I wanted to get out while I still had air in my lungs."

— Bassist Lisa Umbarger explaining her departure from the Toadies.

After hearing that Interscope would no longer promote the album or release a second single, bassist Lisa Umbarger decided to leave the band, and handed in her resignation letter during the middle of the tour on July 14, 2001, owing to the growing tensions in the band, and her disillusionment with their situation. "We were playing all these tiny clubs again. It just didn’t feel right. All the things that Todd was afraid were going to happen were happening. It was a very emotional time for me. It had been such a big part of my life, but I felt like it was the right thing to do." Vaden Todd Lewis decided to break up the band three days later, saying that it was no longer the Toadies without Umbarger. "Me and Lisa [Umbarger] have been there from the start, and that just never even entered my mind," Lewis explained to the Dallas Observer. "I've said it before: This band finally got to where I wanted it--creatively and input-wise--and everybody was on an even playing field, and just everything was good as far as the band itself. Then this happened, and I just figured, well, fuck it then." Clark Vogeler was supportive of Lewis' decision, saying that it "made sense". As a result of Umbarger's departure, the band cancelled the five remaining tour dates in July 2001, sparking rumours about the band's imminent breakup.

Lewis would confirm to the Dallas Observer via phone call that the Toadies were breaking up on August 22, 2001; the newspaper would announce the breakup the following day. The news of the band's breakup came as a surprise to Umbarger, who expected the band to continue without her. "I thought I could have the benefits of going to Starplex and watching from backstage. I thought the Toadies as an entity would continue. I didn't know it would have such a big effect." The band played some farewell shows, with Mark Hughes of Baboon filling in on bass, through September, with their final show taking place in Amarillo, Texas on October 1, 2001. Umbarger wanted to participate in the farewell shows, but could not due to scheduling conflicts; she believes that Lewis deliberately planned these shows to be in conflict with her schedule.

Following the split, the band members went their separate ways and worked on their own individual projects. Lisa Umbarger quit music altogether and moved to Sweden with her boyfriend, Clark Vogeler went to film school and worked on designing websites, Vaden Todd Lewis took a brief hiatus from music before forming a new band with Reverend Horton Heat drummer Taz Bentley, the Burden Brothers, and Mark Reznicek became the drummer for the bluegrass band 1100 Springs. The band did not reunite until March 2006.

== Track listing ==
All lyrics are written by Vaden Todd Lewis and Clark Vogeler; all music is composed by the Toadies, except where noted

No.	Title	Writer(s)	Length
1.	"Plane Crash"		2:10
2.	"Push the Hand"		3:37
3.	"Little Sin"	Lewis; Reznicek; Vogeler	3:07
4.	"Motivational"		2:45
5.	"Heel"		2:46
6.	"You'll Come Down"		3:22
7.	"Pressed Against the Sky"		4:33
8.	"What We Have We Steal"		3:31
9.	"Jigsaw Girl"		4:44
10.	"Sweetness"		4:13
11.	"Hell Below / Stars Above" (featuring Elliott Smith)	Lewis; Reznicek; Vogeler	4:20
12.	"Dollskin"		5:45
Total length:			44:56

== Personnel ==
Personnel per liner notes.

Toadies
- Vaden Todd Lewis - rhythm guitar/vocals
- Mark Reznicek - drums/percussion
- Lisa Umbarger - bass
- Clark Vogeler - lead guitar/piano

Additional musicians

- Elliott Smith - piano (on "Hell Below / Stars Above")
- Rev. White - additional vocals (on "Hell Below / Stars Above"; uncredited)

Artwork

- f-stop fitzgerald, inc. - cover image (from the book Pillars of the Almighty)
- Marina Chavez - photography
- Chris Bilheimer - art direction and back cover image
Production
- Tom Rothrock - producer
- Rob Schnapf - producer
- Monique Mizrahi - engineer
- Andy Wallace - mixing
- Howie Weinberg - mastering

Management

- Scott McGhee – management for AMG
- Davis Shapiro Lewit Grabel & Leven, LLP – legal representation
- Haynes and Boone – legal representation

== Use in media ==
- "Jigsaw Girl" and "Dollskin" were later re-recorded and re-interpreted for the band's sixth studio album, Heretics. "Queen of Scars", off of the aforementioned album, is a sequel to "Jigsaw Girl".

== Chart positions ==
=== Album ===
Chart (2001)	Peak position
US Billboard 200	130

=== Singles ===
Year	Single	Chart	Position
2001	"Push the Hand"	Mainstream Rock Tracks	34
2001	"Push the Hand"	Active Rock	30

== Release history ==
Country	Date
Canada	March 20, 2001
United States	March 20, 2001
