= No Deliverance =

Studio album by Toadies
- Released: August 19, 2008
- Recorded: 2008
- Genres: Grunge; alternative rock; hard rock
- Length: 36.02
- Label: Kirtland
- Producer: David Castell

Toadies chronology
Rock Show (2007)	No Deliverance (2008)	Feeler (2010)

Singles from No Deliverance
- 1. "No Deliverance" Released: June 10, 2008; 2. "Song I Hate" Released: March 6, 2009

No Deliverance is the third studio album by American rock band Toadies, released in 2008 on Kirtland Records. It is the band's first album in seven years after Hell Below/Stars Above, and the first since they reunited in 2006. It is also the band's only album without an official bass player, with bass duties being handled by Vaden Todd Lewis.

The album was promoted by two singles, "No Deliverance" and "Song I Hate", the former which reached number 38 on the Mainstream Rock Airplay chart.

== Release and reception ==
"No Deliverance" was made available for streaming on Spin's website.

The album was released on CD, vinyl and for digital download. While all versions contained ten tracks, the iTunes release included a bonus eleventh track, a cover of The Cure's "A Forest". Those who pre-ordered through Newbury Comics received an autographed CD booklet, while those who pre-ordered it through f.y.e. received an autographed poster.

=== Commercial performance ===
No Deliverance debuted at number 59 on the Billboard 200, selling 8,563 copies in its first week, and remained on the chart for two weeks. As of 2012, the album has sold 39,000 copies in the US.

=== Reception ===
The Austin Chronicle wrote that "the band's jaded alt-rock stomp still has an earthy appeal, as evidenced by slammers 'So Long Lovely Eyes' and 'Flower'." AllMusic wrote that the songs "successfully revisit the band’s mid-1990s post-grunge heyday, particularly on the urgent, Soundgarden-like opener, 'So Long Lovey Eyes'; the stinging title track; and the sinister stomper 'Hell in High Water'." Trouser Press thought that "Lewis/Vaden’s vocals are still strong, having changed very little since 1994."

== Track listing ==
No.	Title	Writer(s)	Length
1.	"So Long Lovey Eyes"	Lewis	3:51
2.	"Nothing to Cry About"	Lewis	3:13
3.	"No Deliverance"	Lewis	3:44
4.	"I Am a Man of Stone"	Lewis, Reznicek, Vogeler	4:22
5.	"Song I Hate"	Lewis, Reznicek, Vogeler	3:41
6.	"Flower"	Lewis	4:25
7.	"Hell In High Water"	Lewis, Reznicek, Vogeler	3:58
8.	"Don't Go My Way"	Lewis	3:50
9.	"One More"	Lewis	4:43
10.	"I Want Your Love"	Lewis	2:15
11.	"A Forest (iTunes Exclusive)"	Robert Smith, Simon Gallup, Matthieu Hartley, Lol Tolhurst	4:58

== Personnel ==
Toadies

- Todd Lewis - vocals, rhythm guitar, bass
- Mark Reznicek - drums
- Clark Vogeler - lead guitar

Production

- David Castell - Producer, Engineer, Digital Editing, Mixing, Audio Production
- Mark Dufour - Digital Editing, Drum Technician
- Michael Garcia - Assistant Engineer, Audio Engineer
- Bart Rose - Assistant Engineer, Audio Engineer
- Andy Sharp - Engineer, Audio Engineer

Artwork

- Scogin Mayo - Photography
- Tommy Moore - Package Design

== Chart positions ==
=== Album ===
Year	Album	Chart	Position
2008	No Deliverance	The Billboard 200	59
2008	No Deliverance	Top Independent Albums	4

=== Singles ===
Year	Single	Chart	Position
2008	"No Deliverance"	Hot Mainstream Rock Tracks	38
