= Rock Show (album) =

Live album by Toadies
- Released: March 17, 2007
- Recorded: March 17, 2007
- Venue: St. Patrick's Day parade, Dallas, Texas
- Genre: Grunge
- Length: 64:01
- Label: DiscLive / Self-released
- Producer: N/A

Toadies chronology
Best of Toadies: Live from Paradise (2002)	Rock Show (2007)	No Deliverance (2008)

Rock Show is a live album by American rock band Toadies. It is a recording of the final show of the band's "Second Coming" reunion tour. It was recorded by DiscLive at the Greenville Avenue St. Patrick's Day parade in Dallas, Texas. The album was released immediately following the show. It is a limited edition CD-R with only 5000 copies having been burned. The album was later released to online music stores such as iTunes Store and Amazon MP3 on September 16, 2008 by Kirtland Records.

== Track listing ==
All tracks are written by Todd Lewis.

No.	Title	Length
1.	"Mr. Love"	3:35
2.	"Plane Crash"	2:07
3.	"Backslider"	2:24
4.	"Quitter"	3:35
5.	"Away"	4:36
6.	"Little Sin"	2:38
7.	"Little Sin (cont.)"	0:24
8.	"I Come from the Water"	2:43
9.	"Push the Hand"	4:14
10.	"Happy Face"	2:49
11.	"Unattractive"	4:10
12.	"Waterfall"	3:55
13.	"Tyler"	4:29
14.	"Possum Kingdom"	5:50
15.	"Crowd Chant 'Toadies'"	0:25
16.	"Paper Dress"	5:51
17.	"Heel"	2:36
18.	"Cut Me Out"	3:30
19.	"I Burn"	4:10

== Credits ==
- Todd Lewis - vocals, guitar
- Mark Reznicek - drums
- Clark Vogeler - guitar
- Mark Hughes - bass
- Chris Hawkes - engineering, mixing, cover art
