= Play.Rock.Music =

Play.Rock.Music.

Studio album by Toadies
- Released: July 31, 2012
- Recorded: 2012
- Genre: Alternative rock; grunge
- Length: 47:46
- Label: Kirtland

Toadies chronology
Feeler (2010)	Play.Rock.Music. (2012)	Heretics (2015)

Professional ratings
Review scores
Source	Rating
AllMusic	3.5/5 stars
QRO	6.2/10

Play.Rock.Music. is the fifth studio album by Toadies produced and mixed by Chris "Frenchie" Smith at the Bubble studio in Austin, Texas. It was released July 31, 2012 on Kirtland Records. It's the first Toadies album to feature Doni Blair on bass.

Originally, the band had planned to release the album as the first of two EPs. However, in an interview, guitarist Clark Vogeler announced that the band had decided to release a full album instead.

On March 13, 2012, a promotional music video of the first single "Summer of the Strange" was posted on Vogeler's YouTube channel.

== Track listing ==
No.	Title	Length
1.	"Rattler's Revival"	3:09
2.	"Get Low"	3:14
3.	"Summer of the Strange"	3:40
4.	"Magic Bullet"	3:49
5.	"Beside You"	4:23
6.	"Animals"	4:39
7.	"Sunshine"	4:22
8.	"Laments of a Good Man"	4:17
9.	"Epic Castles"	3:22
10.	"We Burned the City Down"	2:54
11.	"The Appeal"	6:13
12.	"400 Bucks" (iTunes bonus track)	3:44

== Charts ==
Chart (2012)	Peak position
US Top Current Albums (Billboard)	159
US Independent Albums (Billboard)	35

== Personnel ==
- Todd Lewis – vocals, guitar
- Mark Reznicek – drums
- Clark Vogeler – guitar
- Doni Blair – bass
