= Possum Kingdom Lake =

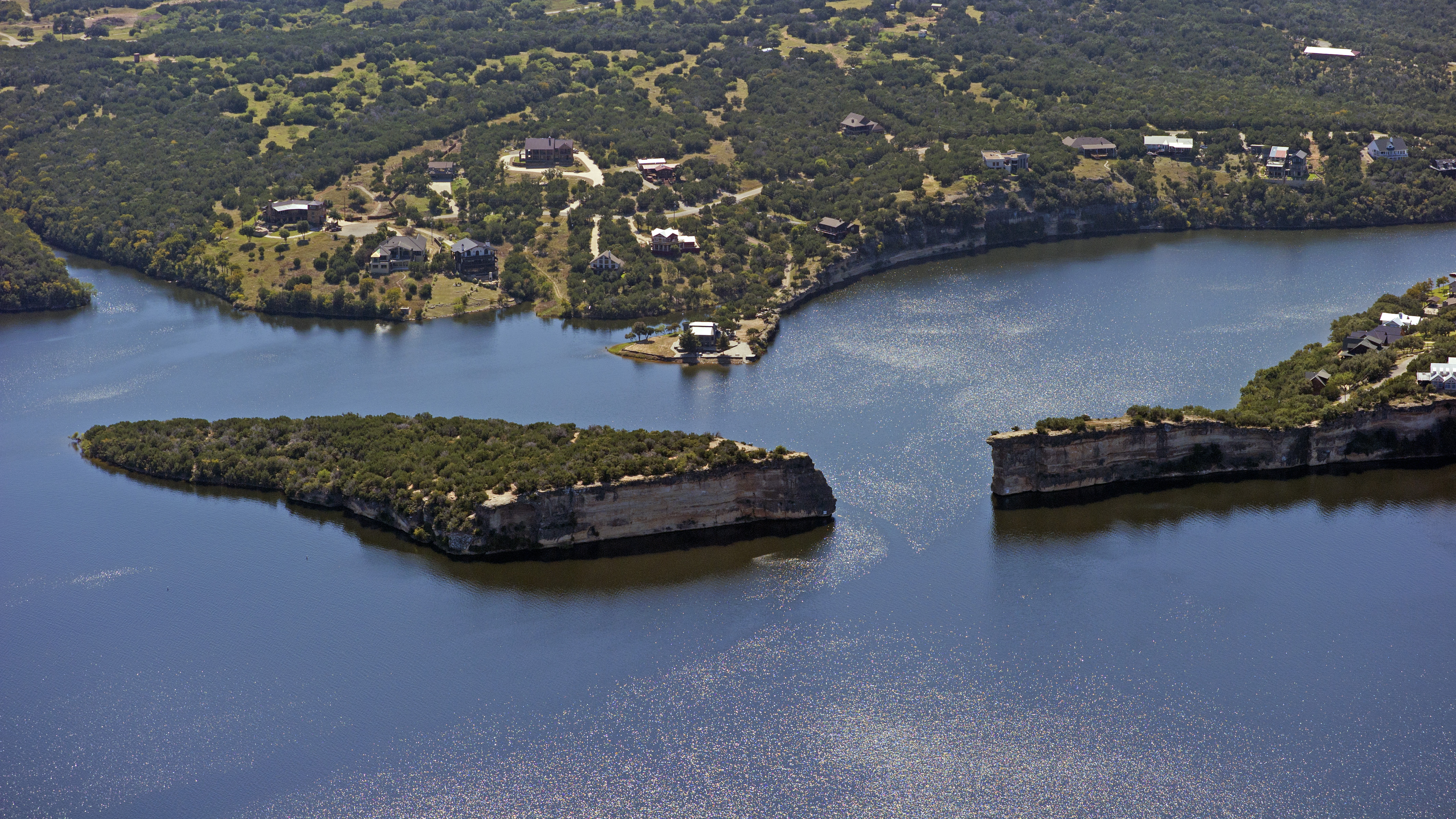

- Location within Texas Location within the United States
- Location: Palo Pinto / Stephens / Young/ Jack counties, Texas
- Coordinates: 32°52.00′N 98°26.00′W
- Type: reservoir
- Primary inflows: Brazos River
- Primary outflows: Brazos River
- Basin countries: United States
- Surface area: 19,800 acres (8,000 ha)
- Max. depth: 100 ft (30 m)
- Water volume: 724,700 acre⋅ft (893,900 ML)
- Shore length^{1}: 310 miles (500 km)
- Surface elevation: 998 ft (304 m)
- ^{1} Shore length is not a well-defined measure.

Possum Kingdom Lake (popularly known as P.K.), is a reservoir on the Brazos River located primarily in Palo Pinto County Texas with small sections in Jack, Stephens and Young counties. It was the first water supply reservoir constructed in the Brazos River basin. The lake is 65 miles long and 2.5 miles wide covering an area of approximately 16,700 acres (6,800 ha) with 310 miles (500 km) of shoreline. It holds 750,000 acre-feet (930,000,000 m^{3}) of water with 550,000 acre-feet (680,000,000 m^{3}) available for water supply.

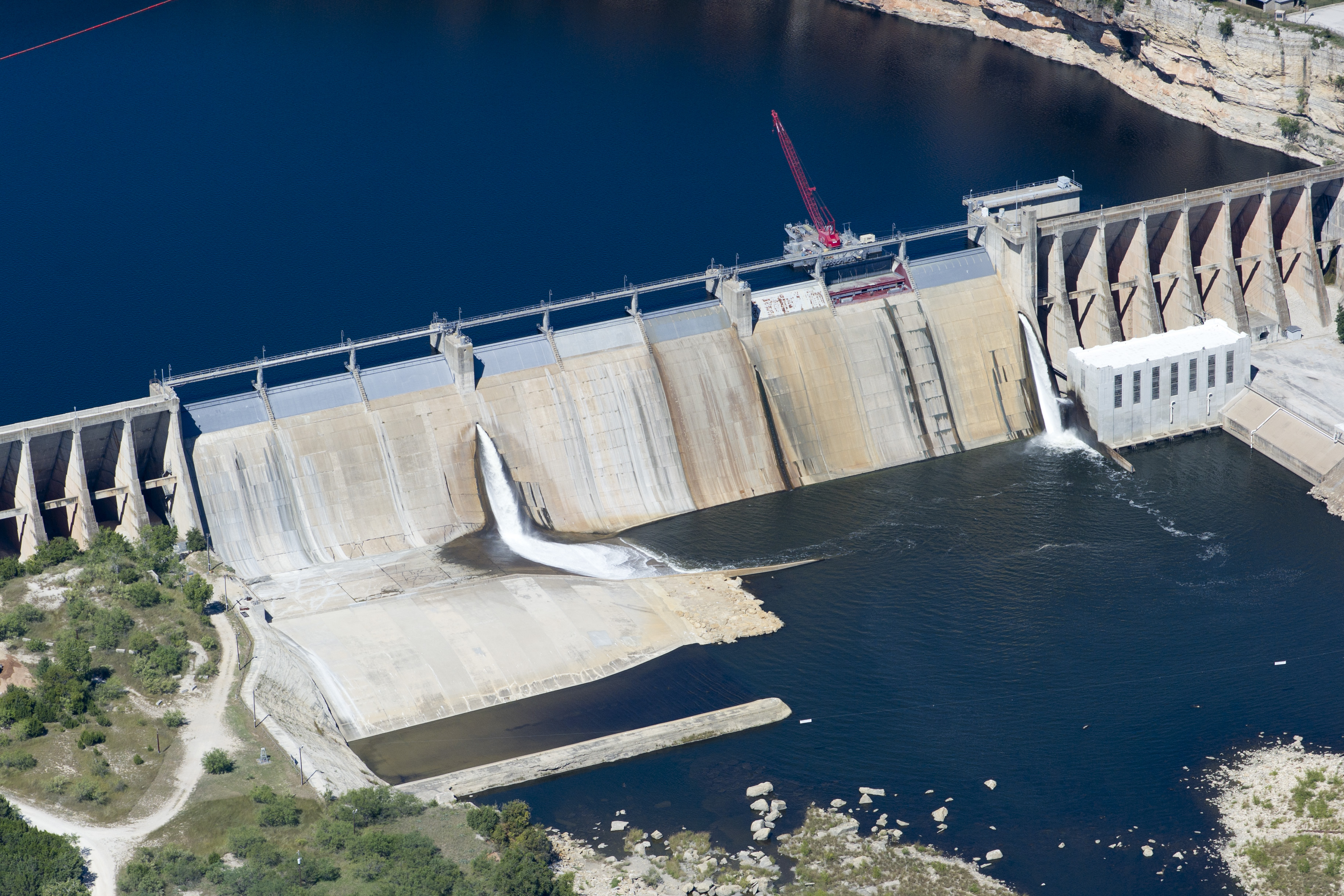
Morris Sheppard Dam

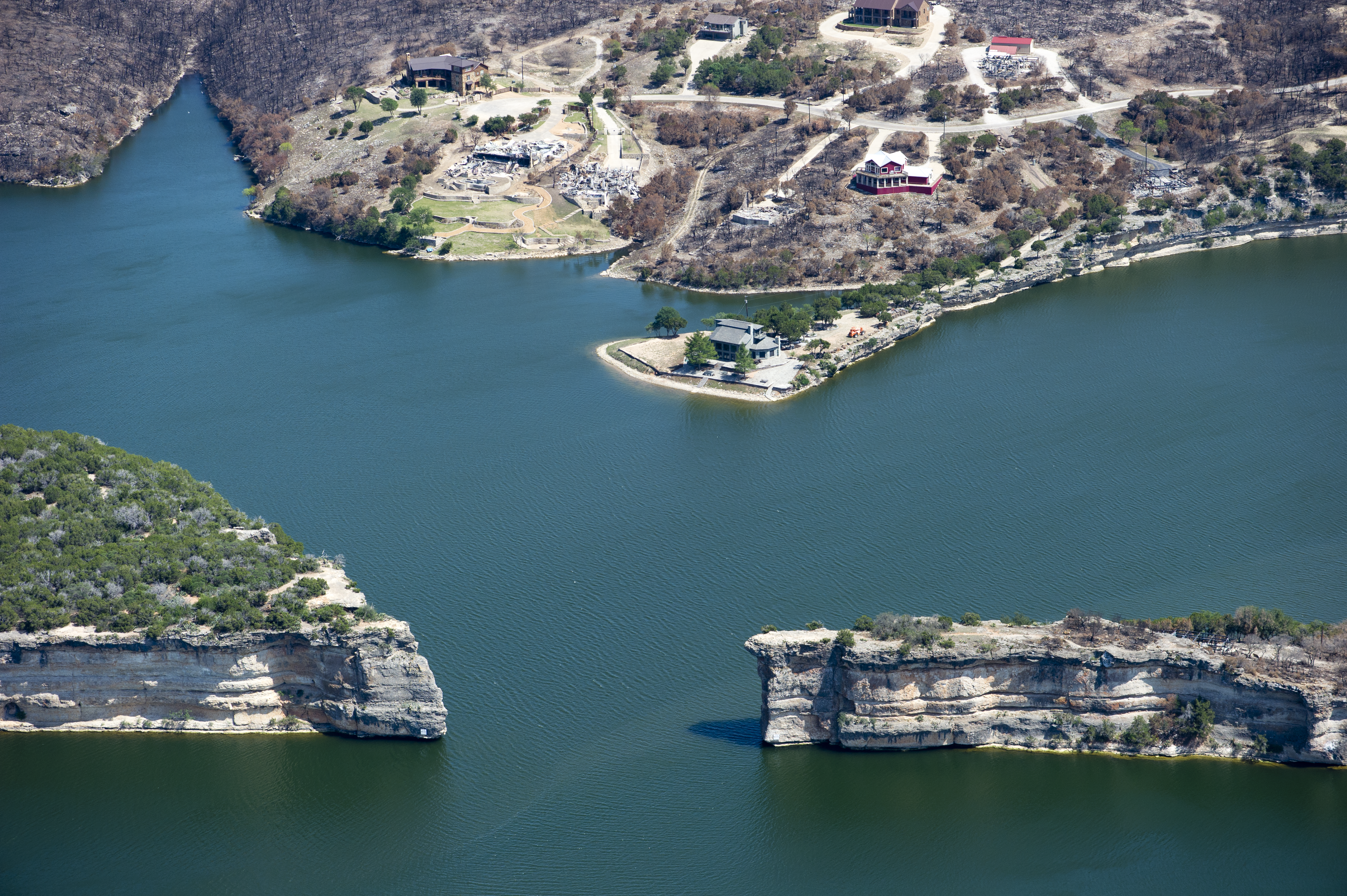
Possum Kingdom Lake, after the devastating wildfires

The lake is impounded by the Morris Sheppard Dam, which was a project of the Brazos River Authority and the Works Progress Administration. Construction was begun in 1938 and completed in 1941. The dam is 2,700 feet (820 m) long and 190 feet (58 m) high. The construction is unique with buttressed arched wings on either side of the nine spillway gates rather than the usual filled concrete. It has two 11,250 kilowatt generators which were used during peak demand periods and were decommissioned in 2007. It was named after United States senator Morris Sheppard for his efforts in obtaining funding for the project.

The lake is located where the Brazos River cuts through the Palo Pinto Mountains. The canyon thus formed provided a favorable site for impoundment of the reservoir and accounts for the unusual depth of the lake and the resulting clarity of the water.

The lake is home to the famous Hell's Gate, a sheer break in the cliffs around the lake. The lake's name was the title of a popular 1990s song "Possum Kingdom" by Toadies. Frontman Vaden Todd Lewis used the lake as the eerie backdrop for a series of interconnected stories on the album Rubberneck.

The lake is home to Possum Kingdom State Park, a 1,530-acre (620 ha) state park governed by the Texas Parks and Wildlife Department. Visitors, avid boaters, and anglers interested in exploring the lake can also utilize local marinas such as Bluff Creek Marina.

== History ==
Possum Kingdom Lake owes its existence to the ambitious public works era of the 1930s. Construction of the Morris Sheppard Dam began in May 1936, during the Great Depression, employing hundreds of workers through the Works Progress Administration. The dam was completed in 1941, standing 2,700 feet (820 m) long and 190 feet (58 m) high, creating a reservoir that would transform the Brazos River valley.

When the gates closed and the water began to rise, the new lake flooded a dramatic stretch of the Brazos known for its steep limestone cliffs, winding canyons, and clear, spring-fed tributaries.

=== How It Got Its Name ===
There are several stories about the origin of the name Possum Kingdom for this part of the Brazos River valley. The most accepted version attributes the name to Ike Sablosky who settled in the region in the early twentieth century. Sablosky was a businessman, a Russian Jewish immigrant who came to America at the age of 13. He arrived in Mineral Wells, Texas from Indianapolis in 1905. Sablosky was suffering from stomach trouble and believed he was dying. Mineral Wells was then nationally famous as a health spa and Sablosky offered an employee of one of the spa hotels ten cents a day for ten days to be allowed to drink all of the mineral water he wanted. The employee accepted and Sablosky claimed that within ten days his stomach problems were cured.

Sablosky then went into the fur and hide business, dealing in, among other things, possum pelts. His best suppliers of these hunted in the canyon of the Brazos and Sablosky began greeting them by saying, "Here are the boys from the Possum Kingdom." Sablosky went on to be a prominent businessman in Dallas. Before his death he left millions of dollars to charity.

=== Historical Settlement ===
Long before the lake existed, this section of the Brazos River was a vital travel corridor. Known as part of the Great Comanche Trail, the valley was a seasonal passage for Comanche, Kiowa, and Apache hunting parties.

By January 1859, settlers such as Henry Belding had established homesteads along the river. Others soon followed, including Reverend G. W. Slaughter, a Baptist minister who provided both spiritual leadership and practical guidance to the scattered frontier families.

Life here was not without conflict. As settlers claimed land and resources, skirmishes with Native American groups became more frequent. Accounts from Painted Pole and early county records describe how isolated acts of aggression — sometimes initiated by settlers — led to retaliatory raids. These back-and-forth strikes often claimed lives, destroyed property, and disrupted both Native and settler ways of life. In response, settlers fortified their homes, organized militia patrols, and slowly pushed Native populations westward.

=== Pickwick ===
One of the earliest organized communities in the area was Pickwick, founded in the late 19th century along the Brazos. From 1891 to 1942, the town’s post office served ranchers, farmers, and trappers who came to trade at its general store, send letters, or catch up on local news.

Pickwick was a regular stop for river travelers, a gathering place for Sunday church services, and the site of a small schoolhouse. According to Painted Pole, it was where surrounding ranch families brought their hides, grain, and gossip.

When the Morris Sheppard Dam was completed, much of Pickwick’s original site disappeared beneath the rising waters. Some families relocated to higher ground, and the name lives on today as a lakeside neighborhood.

==== PK Fires ====
The Possum Kingdom Lake area suffered major wildfires in 2011 during a severe drought, first in April with 160 homes destroyed and again in August–September with 39 homes and 9 recreational vehicles lost. The cause of the second 2011 fire was an electrical spark on the 101 Ranch. The first week of August 2012 brought more wildfires to the PK vicinity (between the dam & Graford) which were possibly ignited by lightning strikes amid the extremely drought-ridden countryside. Texas Governor Perry authorized the Texas military forces to assist in battling them. Several Chinook helicopters were assigned to the Palo Pinto county efforts. The fires were brought under control over a period of days & nights.

== Fishing ==
Possum Kingdom Lake supports diverse sport fishing opportunities. Species include striped bass, largemouth bass, white bass, crappie, blue and channel catfish, and sunfish. The Texas Parks and Wildlife Department (TPWD) annually stocks striped bass to maintain the population.

Possum Kingdom holds the current Texas state record striped bass, a 53-pound, 12-ounce fish caught in 2004.

Local guides note that striped bass fishing is best early in the day or during seasonal transitions, often requiring live bait in deeper waters or artificial lures such as swimbaits and slabs around main lake points. Catfishing is productive using cut bait or prepared baits near submerged structures and baited holes. Interviews with local guides describe waiting for large striper schools to surface and the need for precise timing, especially in summer months.

== Development ==
For decades after the dam’s completion, Possum Kingdom’s shores were known more for bait shops and weathered docks than luxury estates. In the 1950s through the 1970s, weekend cabins and modest homes made up most of the lakefront, often passed down through generations.

That changed dramatically during the early 2000s, and even more so during the COVID-19 pandemic. With remote work freeing people from city offices, buyers from Dallas–Fort Worth, Midland, and beyond began seeking larger properties where they could both live and vacation.

According to REALTOR records, property values in some communities rose by 30–60% between 2020 and 2022. Older fishing cabins were torn down to make way for custom homes with multi-million-dollar price tags. Communities like The Ranch, Gaines Bend, and The Cliffs began to see estate-style builds rivaling the best in the state.

Even so, large sections of shoreline remain undeveloped, including the Caddo Creek area and tracts held by the Brazos River Authority and Texas Parks and Wildlife. This mix of high-end neighborhoods and untouched wilderness is part of what makes Possum Kingdom unusual among Texas lakes.

== Recreation ==
Possum Kingdom Lake is a popular recreation destination, offering boating, waterskiing, scuba diving, and camping. The lake is home to Possum Kingdom State Park, which provides campgrounds, hiking trails, and public boat ramps. One of the most recognized landmarks is Hell’s Gate, a narrow break between two cliffs leading from the lake into a cove, which serves as a focal point for holiday gatherings and events such as fireworks shows.
