= Vaden Todd Lewis =

American musician

Vaden "Danger" Todd Lewis
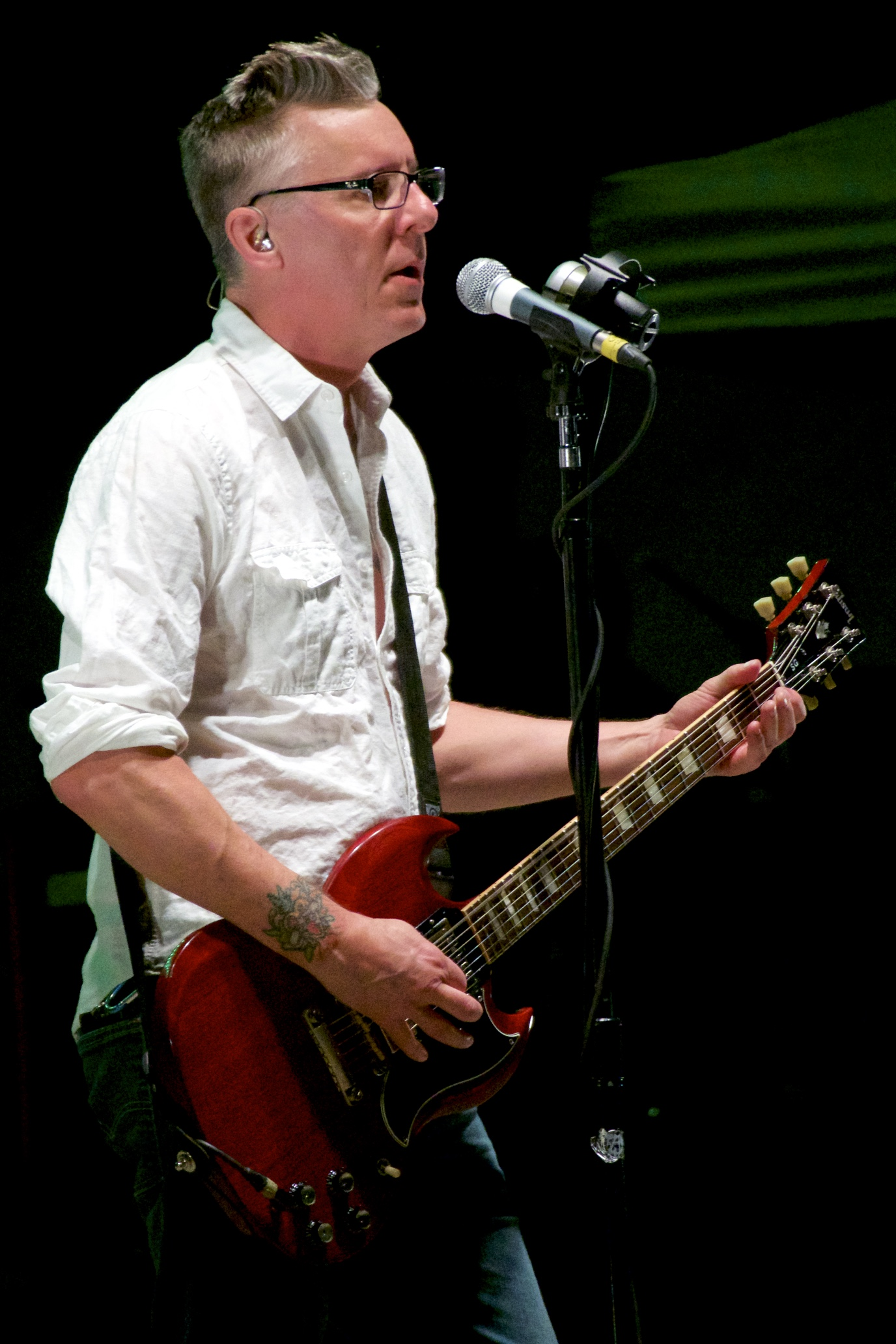
- Vaden Todd Lewis performing with Toadies at the 2015 Dia de los Toadies in Fort Worth, Texas.

Background information
- Also known as: Danger Lewis
- Born: Vaden Danger Todd Lewis; September 3, 1965 (age 60)
- Origin: Fort Worth, Texas
- Genres: Hard rock; alternative rock; grunge
- Occupation: Musician
- Instruments: Guitar, vocals
- Years active: 1980s–present
- Label: Kirtland Records
- Website: Toadies official website

Vaden "Danger" Todd Lewis (born September 3, 1965) is an American musician best known as the vocalist and guitarist for Toadies, an alternative rock band from Fort Worth, Texas. Lewis was also the lead vocalist and guitarist for the Dallas-based Burden Brothers. In July 2017, Lewis opened The Loop Artist Rehearsal Studios in Fort Worth.

== Early life ==
Vaden Todd Lewis was born in Fort Worth, Texas in 1965. At an early age, his parents introduced him to bluegrass and "old school country," which together with locally popular Texas band ZZ Top became his initial musical influences. Around age 15, Lewis began seeking out different non-commercial sounds, which introduced him to Talking Heads and Pixies. Working in a record store in Fort Worth in the late 1980s, Lewis met Lisa Umbarger, who shared Lewis's musical interests.

== Career ==
=== Toadies ===
In 1989, Lewis formed the band Toadies with his record store co-workers, including bassist Lisa Umbarger. During the early 1990s, the band played shows around the Dallas–Fort Worth metroplex and recorded several demos in Lewis's bedroom. After hearing the Toadies' EP Pleather, major label Interscope Records signed the Toadies in 1993 and released the band's debut album Rubberneck in 1994.

After years of touring, Toadies recorded new tracks for a second album, Feeler, but Interscope rejected the album. In 2000, the band went back to the studio, salvaged some songs from the Feeler sessions, and released their second full-length album Hell Below/Stars Above in the spring of 2001. Hell Below/Stars Above was not promoted by Interscope, and saw poor sales.

Interscope Records did little to promote the band's latest album, and as a result, Umbarger resigned from the band in July 2001. Lewis considered Umbarger "the core of the band" and decided to break up the band rather than continue without her. The band played a few farewell shows later that summer, with Mark Hughes filling in for Umbarger, before parting ways.

=== Burden Brothers ===
After the Toadies breakup, Lewis joined up with Taz Bentley of Texas band The Reverend Horton Heat to "record a few tracks, do some shows and put the songs out on the Internet." Lewis and Bentley's new band, Burden Brothers, soon began enjoying local success, with the band's song "Beautiful Night" seeing significant radio airplay in Austin, Texas. Having felt "the itch" to "dive back in", Lewis and Bentley decided to pursue a record deal, and Burden Brothers signed with Kirtland Records, a Dallas, Texas-based label founded by John Kirtland of Deep Blue Something and Jenny Kirtland of The Polyphonic Spree. With Kirtland Records' support, Burden Brothers released Buried in Your Black Heart in 2003, followed by Mercy in 2006.

=== Toadies reunion and other work ===
Lewis joined with former Toadies bandmembers Clark Vogeler and Mark Reznicek to play a Toadies reunion in March 2006. Although this was intended to be a one-time show, the Toadies continued playing shows together, and then Lewis left Burden Brothers to rejoin the Toadies full-time in 2007. According to Vogeler, Lewis made the decision to reunite the Toadies after Lewis began writing new material that "sounded like the Toadies." Toadies signed with Kirtland Records and released a new album, No Deliverance, in 2008. Lewis has since continued performing and releasing albums with Toadies; the band also started an annual Texas music festival, Dia De Los Toadies.

While continuing to perform with the Toadies, Lewis began exploring work as a producer, and produced an album for Fort Worth-based band The Phuss. Lewis also collaborated with Austin-based band LiONS on their track "Poster Child." In September 2015, Lewis also reunited with Burden Brothers for a one-night performance at Dia De Los Toadies, while also performing with the Toadies later that evening.

== Discography ==
=== With Burden Brothers ===
- 8 Ball (2002 EP)
- Queen O' Spades (2002 EP)
- Beautiful Night (2003 EP)
- Buried in Your Black Heart (2003)
- "Shadow" (2004 single)
- "Walk Away" / "Jailbreak" (2005 single)
- RYFOLAMF (Rock Your Face Off Like A Mother Fucker) (2005 live DVD)
- Mercy (2006)

=== With Ginger ===
- Yoni (2006)

=== With Toadies ===
See Toadies discography

- "1989 4 Track Demos" (1989)
- Slaphead (1989)
- Chatterbox (1990)
- "Dig a Hole" / "I Hope You Die" (1990)
- Velvet (1992)
- "Mister Love" (1993)
- Pleather (1993)
- Rubberneck (1994)
- "Belated Valentines (Not in Love)" (1995, split 7-inch single with Slowpoke)
- Y're Cute (1995)
- Feeler (1998, unreleased)
- Hell Below / Stars Above (2001)
- Best of Toadies: Live from Paradise (2002)
- Rock Show (2007)
- No Deliverance (2008)
- Feeler (2010)
- Play.Rock.Music (2012)
- Heretics (2015)
- The Lower Side of Uptown (2017)
- The Charmer (2026)

=== Other credits ===
Year	Artist(s)	Work	Role	Ref.
2009	LiONS	"Poster Child" (from Let No One Fall EP)	Co-writer	
2012	The Phuss	The Phuss (album)	Producer	
