= Feeler (Toadies album) =

Album by Toadies

Feeler was supposed have been the Toadies's follow-up album to the critically acclaimed debut Rubberneck; however, it was rejected by Interscope Records. In June 2010, the band announced they had re-entered the studio to "rediscover" and re-record the album. This nine-song version was released on August 10, 2010.

== 1998 recordings ==
In 1997, the band decided to end their Rubberneck tour and began work on their follow-up album. In the beginning of 1998, the band entered Arlyn Studios and Pedernales Studio with producer Paul Leary. They recorded 15 songs in consideration for the album, initially planning for a fall 1998 release. By August, due to 'scheduling problems', the album, which now had the tentative title Feeler, was still not mixed or mastered, although there was still hope that it would be released in early 1999. During this time, the band considered adding more songs to the album, including "You'll Come Down", "Trust Game", "Cut Me Out" and "Broke Down Stupid". Interscope Records did not approve the finished product, and rejected its release. The band went back into the studio, salvaging some of the songs recorded during the Feeler sessions, and eventually released their second full-length album Hell Below/Stars Above in the spring of 2001.

The band planned on releasing the music and were asking for suggestions for tracks to put on it on their message board before it unexpectedly went down. At this point the record company claims to have lost the master recordings for the album.

Listed below are the original Feeler songs. Note that an official track list order was never finalized, and not all of the songs would have necessarily appeared on the album. Non-mastered versions have been leaked online.

=== Track listing ===
| No. | Title | Length |
|---|---|---|
| 1. | "City of Hate (Rerecorded 2010)" | 3:16 |
| 2. | "Pink (Rerecorded 2010)" | 2:52 |
| 3. | "Waterfall (Rerecorded 2010)" | 3:53 |
| 4. | "Twitch" | 3:13 |
| 5. | "Mine (Rerecorded 2010)" | 2:17 |
| 6. | "Dead Boy (Rerecorded 2010)" | 3:03 |
| 7. | "Tornado" | 4:27 |
| 8. | "Joey, Let's Go (Rerecorded 2010)" | 4:01 |
| 9. | "Suck Magic (Rerecorded 2010)" | 3:02 |
| 10. | "Clarksville" | 3:08 |
| 11. | "Your Day" | 2:55 |
| 12. | "Littlefish" | 4:43 |
| 13. | "Push the Hand (Rerecorded 2001)" | 3:48 |
| 14. | "Best of Three (What We Have We Steal) (Rerecorded 2001)" | 4:04 |
| 15. | "Dollskin (Rerecorded 2001)" | 5:53 |

=== Personnel ===
- Todd Lewis – guitar, vocals
- Mark Reznicek – drums, percussion
- Lisa Umbarger – bass guitar
- Clark Vogeler – guitar, piano

=== About the songs ===
- "Tornado" was originally written and recorded by Lisa Umbarger's father's band, the Jiants, in 1959.
- A total of five of the Feeler songs were re-recorded during the sessions for Hell Below/Stars Above. Three of them appear on the album, "Push the Hand", "Best of Three" (as "What We Have We Steal") and "Dollskin". Additionally, "Joey, Let's Go" was recorded and released on a compilation and "Waterfall" was recorded, but not officially released.
- A live version of "ATF" can be found on Best of Toadies: Live from Paradise.

== 2010 release ==
Feeler

Studio album by Toadies
- Released: August 10, 2010
- Recorded: 2010
- Genre: Grunge
- Length: 28:15
- Label: Kirtland
- Producer: Rob Schnapf

Toadies chronology
| No Deliverance (2008) | Feeler (2010) | Play.Rock.Music (2012) |

Professional ratings
Review scores
| Source | Rating |
|---|---|
| AllMusic | 3/5 stars |
| Spin | 7/10 stars |
| Type 3 Media | 7.5/10 stars |
| Boston Globe | 4/5 stars |

Following the band's reformation in 2008, talk among the fan community and even from the band itself discussed the possibility of finally releasing Feeler in some format. However, Interscope refused to relinquish their rights to the original recordings. This led to the band deciding to re-record the songs from the album, although as Kirtland Records' Tami Thomsen stated, "it's not necessarily the exact same album", and that this version of Feeler is "the band's interpretation of those songs, completely new and completely from scratch." The songs "Twitch", "Tornado", "Clarksville", "Littlefish", and "Your Day" were not recorded for the new album, while "Trust Game", and "ATF Theme", originally demos from around the same time, were. Packaging for the CD, vinyl, and picture disc were designed by Tommy Moore.

=== Track listing ===
All tracks are written by Vaden Todd Lewis, Mark Reznicek and Clark Vogeler.

| No. | Title | Length |
|---|---|---|
| 1. | "Trust Game" | 2:58 |
| 2. | "Waterfall" | 3:51 |
| 3. | "Dead Boy" | 2:58 |
| 4. | "City of Hate" | 4:04 |
| 5. | "Mine" | 2:19 |
| 6. | "Suck Magic" | 3:03 |
| 7. | "ATF" | 2:17 |
| 8. | "Joey, Let's Go" | 3:38 |
| 9. | "Pink" | 3:07 |

iTunes bonus tracks
| No. | Title | Length |
|---|---|---|
| 10. | "Don't Let Me Down" (The Beatles cover) | 3:23 |

=== Personnel ===
- Vaden Todd Lewis – vocals, guitar, bass
- Clark Vogeler – guitar, backing vocals
- Mark Reznicek – drums, percussion
