= The Lower Side of Uptown =

Studio album by Toadies
- Released: September 8, 2017
- Studios: Arlyn Studio, Austin, Texas
- Genres: Alternative rock, grunge, punk rock
- Length: 40:58
- Label: Kirtland
- Producer: Chris “Frenchie” Smith

Toadies chronology
Heretics (2015)	The Lower Side of Uptown (2017)

Singles from Lower Side of Uptown
- 1. "Broke Down Stupid" Released: July 21, 2017; 2. "Mama Take Me Home" Released: September 8, 2017

== Critical reception ==
Professional ratings
Review scores
Source	Rating
Paste	7.3/10

The Lower Side of Uptown is the seventh studio album by the alternative rock band Toadies. It was released in September 2017 by independent record label Kirtland Records.

== Background ==
Lead guitarist Clark Vogeler stated the 'original compositions' make the album "closest to old-school Toadies than any others we’ve made in the last 10 years." He said "I feel that subconsciously we thought that this record would have ended up incorporating some of that quieter sound, but that didn’t happen." The album was produced by Chris “Frenchie” Smith. The album was described as "a well thought-out project with a lot of talent."

== Track listing ==
No.	Title	Length
1.	"When I Die"	3:00
2.	"Take Me Alive"	4:00
3.	"Polly Jean"	3:36
4.	"You Know the Words"	3:04
5.	"Mama Take Me Home"	3:51
6.	"Keep Breathing"	2:56
7.	"Amen"	4:00
8.	"Human Cannonball"	2:42
9.	"Broke Down Stupid"	4:43
10.	"I Put a Spell on You" (Screamin' Jay Hawkins cover)	2:34
11.	"Echo"	2:47
12.	"Sentimental"	3:45

== Personnel ==
- Vaden Todd Lewis – lead vocals, rhythm guitar
- Clark Vogeler – lead guitar, backing vocals
- Doni Blair – bass
- Mark Reznicek – drums

== Charts ==
Chart (2017)	Peak position
US Independent Albums (Billboard)	35
US Hard Rock Album Sales (Billboard)	12
US Top Rock Album Sales (Billboard)	48
