= Starting Over (Killswitch Engage song) =

Single by Killswitch Engage

from the album Killswitch Engage
- Released: June 6, 2009
- Recorded: 2009
- Genre: Metalcore
- Length: 3:53
- Label: Roadrunner
- Songwriters: Mike D'Antonio, Adam Dutkiewicz, Justin Foley, Howard Jones, Joel Stroetzel
- Producers: Brendan O'Brien; Adam Dutkiewicz

Killswitch Engage singles chronology
"Reckoning" (2009)	"Starting Over" (2009)	"Take Me Away" (2009)

"Starting Over" is the second single by the American metalcore band Killswitch Engage from their fifth album Killswitch Engage.

== Background ==
In a 2009 interview bass player Mike D'Antonio commented on the song stating "It’s not your typical Killswitch but it does have that Killswitch feel. It was a song that we felt was strong. Whether it was the initial single or not, a little surprised, but that was a song that our drummer pretty much wrote entirely and it was the only one that made it on the record that he wrote. He was really excited about it."

Foley wrote the song wrote the song with G-chord vamps on an acoustic guitar he had lying around the house. The song was written in G chord due to Foley having the desire to write something out of C chord which most of the bands songs are played in. He then showed the song to guitarists Adam Dutkiewicz and Joel Stroetzel, stating that they "spiced it up like crazy and made it sound really good."

== Music video ==
The song's music video is directed by frequent collaborator Lex Halaby.

== Track listing ==
No.	Title	Length
1.	"Starting Over"	3:53

== Personnel ==
Killswitch Engage

- Howard Jones – lead vocals
- Adam Dutkiewicz – lead guitar, backing vocals
- Joel Stroetzel – rhythm guitar
- Mike D'Antonio – bass guitar
- Justin Foley – drums

== Charts ==
Chart (2009)	Peak position
US Mainstream Rock (Billboard)	30
UK Rock and Metal (Official Charts)	28
