= Best of Toadies: Live from Paradise =

Live album by Toadies
- Released: November 19, 2002
- Recorded: May 10, 2001
- Venues: Paradise, Boston, Massachusetts
- Genre: Grunge
- Length: 64:31
- Label: Aezra/Orpheus

Toadies chronology
Hell Below / Stars Above (2001)	Best of Toadies: Live from Paradise (2002)	Rock Show (2007)

Professional ratings
Review scores
Source	Rating
Allmusic	4/5 stars

Best of Toadies: Live from Paradise is a live album by American rock band Toadies. It was recorded at the Paradise Rock Club in Boston, MA, just prior to the band's breakup in 2001 and released as a limited edition in March 2002 on Aezra Records/Orpheus Music. It was re-released on July 13, 2004. The album proclaims: "No overdubs. Warts and all!"

Best of Toadies: Live from Paradise is an enhanced CD featuring a short video about the band.

== Track listing ==
No.	Title	Writer(s)	Length
1.	"Plane Crash"	Todd Lewis	2:37
2.	"I Come from the Water"	Todd Lewis	2:34
3.	"Heel"	Todd Lewis	2:42
4.	"Quitter"	Todd Lewis	3:30
5.	"Hell Below / Stars Above"	Todd Lewis	4:12
6.	"Little Sin"	Todd Lewis	3:00
7.	"Away"	Todd Lewis	4:35
8.	"Motivational"	Todd Lewis	2:23
9.	"Mr. Love"	Todd Lewis	3:12
10.	"Backslider"	Todd Lewis	2:22
11.	"Paper Dress"	Todd Lewis	4:36
12.	"Push the Hand"	Todd Lewis	3:36
13.	"ATF"	Todd Lewis	2:19
14.	"Possum Kingdom"	Todd Lewis	5:13
15.	"Dollskin"	Todd Lewis	5:41
16.	"Tyler"	Todd Lewis	4:19
17.	"I Burn"	Todd Lewis	3:35
18.	"Where Is My Mind?"	Black Francis	4:05

== Credits ==
- Todd Lewis - lead vocals and guitar
- Lisa Umbarger - bass and backing vocals
- Clark Vogeler - right guitar and backing vocals
- Mark Reznicek - drum kit
- Stewart Bennett - front-of-house
- Edo Levi - monitors, drum tech, percussion
- Brian Bunn - guitar tech
- Sean Bailey - tour manager
- Ethan Dussault - recorder
- Team Vision - engineer, mixing, mastering
- Jonathan Purvis - photos
- Fabio Jafet - video production
- Mark Falkin - legal representation
