= Rubberneck (album) =

Studio album by Toadies
- Released: August 23, 1994
- Recorded: September 18 – October 7, 1993
- Studios: Record Two Mendocino, Comptche, California; The Sound Factory, Hollywood, California
- Genres: Grunge; hard rock; punk rock
- Length: 36:21
- Label: Interscope
- Producers: Tom Rothrock; Rob Schnapf

Toadies chronology
Pleather (1993)	Rubberneck (1994)	Hell Below/Stars Above (2001)

Singles from Rubberneck
- 1. "Mister Love" Released: 1994; 2. "Possum Kingdom" Released: 1994; 3. "Away" Released: 1995; 4. "Tyler" Released: 1996; 5. "Backslider" Released: 1996

Rubberneck is the debut studio album by American rock band Toadies. It was released in August 1994 on Interscope Records and attained RIAA gold and platinum status in December 1995 and December 1996 respectively. The album produced the band's most popular single, "Possum Kingdom".

In 2014, in honor of the album's 20th anniversary, Kirtland Records re-released the album on CD and vinyl on April 1. The album was remastered and also includes five bonus tracks. Three of the bonus tracks are previously unreleased songs from the original album's sessions, including "Run in with Dad" and a cover of Pylon's "Stop It", both of which were previously recorded for Velvet, and "Rockfish", an early version of "Waterfall", a song later recorded for Feeler, the intended follow-up to Rubberneck. The other two bonus tracks are early live versions of "Possum Kingdom" and "Tyler", recorded at Trees Dallas on December 5, 1991. The vinyl only features the original 11 album tracks, and includes a download of the five bonus tracks.

Also in honor of the album's 20th anniversary, current band member Clark Vogeler made Dark Secrets: The Stories of Rubberneck, a 23-minute documentary about the album, featuring original behind-the-scenes footage recorded by Lisa Umbarger as well as newly recorded interviews. It was debuted on March 10, 2014, at the Kessler Theater, in Dallas, Texas. The documentary was then posted on the internet two days later.

== Critical reception ==
Professional ratings
Review scores
Source	Rating
AllMusic	3/5 stars
CMJ	(favorable)
Detroit Free Press	3/4 stars
The Encyclopedia of Popular Music	3/5 stars
Fort Worth Star-Telegram	5/5 stars

The New York Times opined that "Todd Lewis's voice comes across somewhere between Robert Plant and Eddie Vedder." The Village Voice noted that the band's "shrewd mixture of black-metal thematics, punk aggression, and grunge melancholia contains a seed of genuine revelation that rewards anyone who isn't scared off by the whiff of brimstone and scandal that clings to their work."

== Track listing ==
All tracks are written by Vaden Todd Lewis, except where noted.

No.	Title	Writer(s)	Length
1.	"Mexican Hairless"	Lewis, Darrel Herbert	1:48
2.	"Mister Love"		2:51
3.	"Backslider"		2:30
4.	"Possum Kingdom"		5:09
5.	"Quitter"	Lewis, Herbert	3:33
6.	"Away"		4:34
7.	"I Come from the Water"		2:46
8.	"Tyler"		4:13
9.	"Happy Face"	Lewis, Herbert	2:58
10.	"Velvet"		2:30
11.	"I Burn"		3:33

20th anniversary bonus tracks
No.	Title	Writer(s)	Length
12.	"Run in with Dad"		2:07
13.	"Stop It" (Pylon cover)	Randall Bewley, Curtis Crowe, Vanessa Briscoe Hay, Michael Lachowski	2:54
14.	"Rockfish"		2:42
15.	"Possum Kingdom" (Live)		4:31
16.	"Tyler" (Live)		4:06

== Personnel ==
Toadies

- Vaden Todd Lewis – vocals, rhythm guitar
- Darrel Herbert – lead guitar
- Lisa Umbarger – bass, baritone guitar
- Mark Reznicek – drums, percussion

Additional

- Tom Rothrock – producer, engineer
- Rob Schnapf – producer, engineer
- Sally Browder – Engineer
- Andy Wallace – mixing
- Howie Weinberg – mastering
- Eric White – mixing assistant
- Michael Lavine – photography

== Chart positions ==
=== Weekly charts ===
Chart (1995)	Peak position
US Billboard 200	56
US Heatseekers Albums (Billboard)	1

=== Year-end charts ===
Chart (1996)	Position
US Billboard 200	134

=== Singles ===
Year	Single	Chart	Position
1995	"Possum Kingdom"	Mainstream Rock Tracks	9
1995	"Possum Kingdom"	Modern Rock Tracks	4
1996	"Away"	Mainstream Rock Tracks	23
1996	"Away"	Modern Rock Tracks	28
