= Toadies =

American rock band

- Toadies performing at the White Rabbit in San Antonio, Texas in 2007.

Background information
- Origin: Fort Worth, Texas, U.S.
- Genres: Grunge; alternative rock; hard rock; punk rock
- Works: Discography
- Years active: 1989–2001; 2006–present
- Labels: Kirtland; Interscope; Aezra
- Members: Vaden Todd Lewis; Mark Reznicek; Clark Vogeler; Doni Blair
- Past members: Charles Mooney III; Lisa Umbarger; Guy Vaughan; Terry Valderas; Michael Jerome; Matt Winchel; Tracey Sauerwein; Darrel Herbert; Mark Hughes
- Website: http://www.thetoadies.com/

Toadies are an American rock band formed in 1989 in Fort Worth, Texas. They are best known for their 1994 song "Possum Kingdom", which peaked at number four on Billboard's Modern Rock Tracks chart and was featured in several films, television shows and video games. The band's classic lineup consisted of Vaden Todd Lewis (lead vocals, rhythm guitar), Lisa Umbarger (bass guitar), Darrel Herbert (lead guitar), and Mark Reznicek (drums). The band has undergone several line-up changes, with Lewis serving as the sole remaining original member.

The band released three studio albums before disbanding in 2001, after bassist and co-founder Umbarger left the group. The band reformed in 2006 without her, and released their third album No Deliverance two years later. In 2010, they re-released the album Feeler with Kirtland Records, after the album's original release was denied by Interscope in 1997. The band's ninth and most recent album, The Charmer, was released in May 2026.

== Biography ==
=== Early years, Slaphead, Rubberneck, and commercial breakthrough (1989–1996) ===
Toadies began in 1989 in Fort Worth, Texas. The initial lineup consisted of vocalist/guitarist Vaden Todd Lewis, bassist Lisa Umbarger, guitarist Charles Mooney III, and drummer Guy Vaughan, although Terry Valderas quickly replaced Vaughan on drums after a few live shows. The band self-released the independent album Slaphead in 1989. Afterwards, the band went through numerous lineup changes, which eventually stabilized with Vaden on vocals/guitar, Umbarger on bass, Mark Reznicek on drums, and Darrel Herbert on guitar. During their first few years together, Toadies recorded additional one-off singles and demo EPs. After releasing the EP titled Pleather on Grass Records, Toadies signed to the major label Interscope Records. Their first full-length album, Rubberneck, was released in the summer of 1994. Featuring a sound described as "distinctly grunge" and "distinctly Texan", Rubberneck included six singles, "Possum Kingdom", "Mister Love", "Away", "Tyler", "Backslider" and "I Come From the Water". "Backslider" can be heard in the film Black Sheep. "Possum Kingdom" would later become a playable track in the Xbox 360 version of Guitar Hero II. Interscope did not properly promote the album for its first year on release, calling it a "marketing strategy", until "Possum Kingdom" became a successful single in late 1995, reaching number nine on the Mainstream Rock Chart.

Toadies toured extensively throughout the 1990s supporting Rubberneck, opening for artists such as Red Hot Chili Peppers, White Zombie, Bush, and The Butthole Surfers. The band also headlined and co-headlined tours with acts such as Supersuckers, and The Reverend Horton Heat. Toadies were a regular act at the festivals Edgefest in Dallas, and Buzzfest in Houston during these years. By 1996, Clark Vogeler had replaced Herbert on guitar.

=== Feeler sessions, Hell Below/Stars Above, and breakup (1997–2002) ===
The band entered the studio in 1997 to record new tracks for a second album, Feeler. Interscope Records did not approve the finished product, and rejected its 1998 release. In 2000, they went back to the studio, salvaged some of the songs from the Feeler sessions, and released their second full-length album Hell Below/Stars Above in the spring of 2001. Portland-based musician Elliott Smith performed piano backup for the title track.

Hell Below/Stars Above was not promoted by Interscope and saw poor sales. The band toured in the spring and summer of 2001 in support of the new album, until bassist Lisa Umbarger unexpectedly resigned from the band on July 14, 2001. Umbarger told the Dallas Observer that she resigned after realizing that Interscope Records was not going to promote the band. Vaden Todd Lewis decided to break up the band rather than continue without her, a decision which "stunned" Umbarger. The band played a few farewell shows later that summer, with Mark Hughes filling in for Umbarger, before parting ways after their final show on October 1, 2001.

Shortly after the break-up, a live album, Best of Toadies: Live from Paradise, was released. It was recorded earlier in 2001 at the Paradise Rock Club in Boston, MA. The album was released through Aezra Records, but Kirtland Records later picked up the band's back catalogue.

=== No Deliverance, Feeler release, and Play.Rock.Music (2006–2013) ===
Toadies reformed for a reunion show on March 11, 2006, headlining the Greenville Avenue St. Patrick's Day parade concert, drawing in an estimated 100,000 people. In March 2007, they embarked on a mini-tour, playing dates in Austin, Houston, and Dallas. The final show of the mini-tour was recorded and released as the live album Rock Show.

The band released its third studio album, No Deliverance, on August 19, 2008, via Kirtland Records. The lead single for the album was the title track.

Toadies performed at Lollapalooza on August 2, 2008, Wildflower! Arts and Music Festival on May 16, 2009, and May 18, 2013, and Austin City Limits Music Festival on October 4, 2009. In addition, on August 31, 2008, the Toadies headlined the inaugural Dia De Los Toadies, an annual Texas music festival organized by and featuring the band.

In June 2010 it was announced that Feeler, the follow-up album to Rubberneck that was shelved by Interscope, would finally be seeing a release. Vaden Todd Lewis was quoted as saying: "Since there are unfinished versions floating around on the Internet, it is important to us that people hear it as we meant it to be." The band was unable to obtain the original 1997 Feeler masters from Interscope, and re-recorded the album in 2010. The album was released on July 20, 2010.

The band's fifth album, Play.Rock.Music, was released July 31, 2012 on Kirtland Records. A promotional video for the track, "Summer of the Strange," can be viewed on Clark Vogeler's YouTube channel.

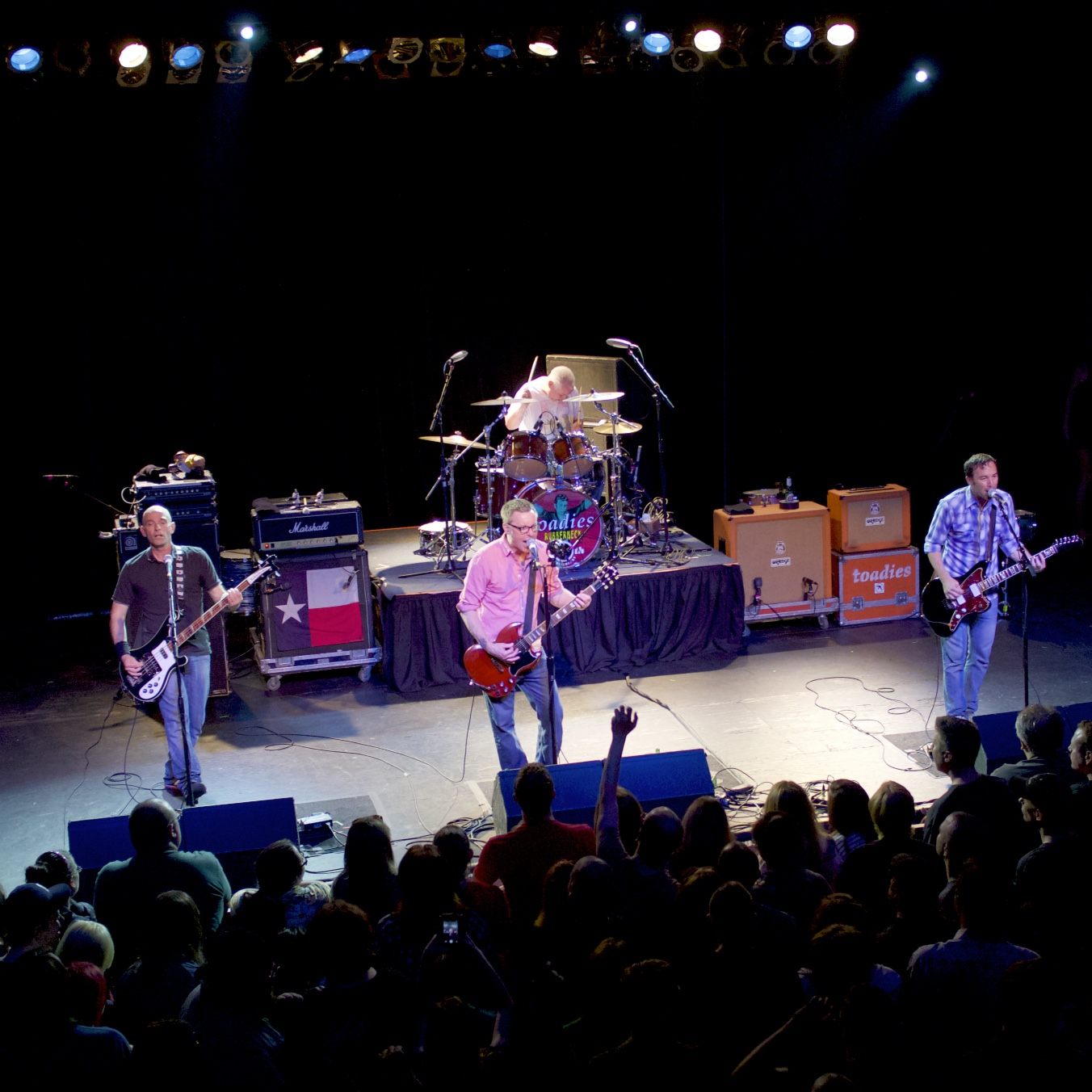
Toadies performing in Philadelphia, Pennsylvania, during the Rubberneck 20th Anniversary Tour.

=== Rubberneck 20th anniversary celebration, Heretics and The Lower Side of Uptown (2014–2021) ===
On January 7, 2014, the Toadies announced via its Facebook page that its Rubberneck album would be reissued by Kirtland Records with five previously unreleased bonus tracks. The announcement also revealed plans for a nationwide Rubberneck 20-year anniversary tour, featuring the Toadies playing the entire Rubberneck album "front to back", with supporting acts Supersuckers and Battleme. The tour ended in September 2014 with a final Rubberneck start to finish performance, followed by performances of the band's more recent songs, at the seventh annual Dia De Los Toadies festival in Fort Worth.

In January 2015, Everclear announced its fourth annual multi-city Summerland Tour via Twitter. The 2015 Summerland Tour featured Everclear and Toadies, as well as alternative rock bands American Hi-Fi and Fuel.

In June 2015, Toadies announced that its eighth album, Heretics, would be released September 18. The album "re-imagines and reinterprets" several Toadies songs such as "Possum Kingdom" and "Backslider," and featured two new songs and a cover of Blondie's 1979 single "Heart of Glass". The Toadies also launched a new tour to promote Heretics in the fall of 2015, with the tour starting at the eighth annual Dia De Los Toadies music festival in September 2015.

The Toadies released its ninth album, The Lower Side of Uptown on September 8, 2017, via Kirtland Records. On September 6, 2017, band members kicked off their fall tour with Local H in Denton, Texas.

=== Damn You All to Hell EP, Rubberneck 25th anniversary tour and The Charmer (2022–present) ===
Toadies released the EP Damn You All to Hell on September 13, 2022, as they began touring North America to celebrate the 25th anniversary of the album Rubberneck. The EP is four previously unreleased tracks, including a cover of David Bowie's "Sound and Vision". Three of the songs were recorded during sessions for the band's latest studio album The Lower Side of Uptown, while "Forgiven" was recorded during the No Deliverance sessions.

On January 8, 2024, Toadies announced that their eighth studio album The Charmer, which was recorded with Steve Albini at Electrical Audio in Chicago, was scheduled to be released later in the year. However, following Albini's death in May of that year, the album was delayed multiple times before its release on May 1, 2026.

== Band members ==
Current members

- Vaden Todd Lewis – lead vocals, rhythm guitar (1989–2001, 2006–present), bass (2008)
- Mark Reznicek – drums (1991–2001, 2006–present)
- Clark Vogeler – lead guitar, backing vocals (1996–2001, 2006–present)
- Doni Blair – bass, backing vocals (2008–present)

Former members

- Charles Mooney III – lead guitar (1989–1992)
- Lisa Umbarger – bass (1989–2001), backing vocals (1996–2001)
- Guy Vaughan – drums (1989)
- Terry Valderas – drums (1989)
- Charles Madison Winchell III – drums (1989–1990)
- Michael Jerome – drums (1990–1991)
- Tracey Sauerwein – rhythm guitar (1991–1992; died 2004)
- Darrel Herbert – lead guitar (1992–1996)
- Mark Hughes – bass (2001, 2006–2008)

Former touring musicians

- Edo Levi – percussion (2001)

== Discography ==
- Slaphead (1989) (Note: Released independently.)
- Rubberneck (1994)
- Hell Below/Stars Above (2001)
- No Deliverance (2008)
- Feeler (2010) (Note: Although Feeler was originally recorded in the late 1990s, it remained unreleased. The band revisited and re-recorded some of the material to release it as a proper album in 2010.)
- Play.Rock.Music. (2012)
- Heretics (2015) (Note: Released as a studio album, yet contains a cover song, re-recordings of the band's older material, and a few then-new songs.)
- The Lower Side of Uptown (2017)
- The Charmer (2026)

== See also ==
- Dia De Los Toadies
- List of alternative music artists
