= Possum Kingdom (song) =

Single by Toadies

from the album Rubberneck
- Released: 1994
- Genre: Grunge; alternative rock; hard rock; pop-punk
- Length: 5:08
- Label: Interscope
- Songwriter: Todd Lewis
- Producers: Tom Rothrock, Rob Schnapf

Toadies singles chronology
"Mister Love" (1994)	"Possum Kingdom" (1994)	"Away" (1995)

Music video
- "Possum Kingdom" on YouTube

"Possum Kingdom" is a song by American rock band Toadies, released in 1994 as the second single from their debut album Rubberneck.

The song's origins lie in folklore from the band's native state of Texas. Possum Kingdom Lake is a lake in North Texas near Fort Worth. In the documentary "Dark Secrets: The Stories of Rubberneck", vocalist Vaden Todd Lewis further elaborates that he intended "Possum Kingdom" to be a continuation of the story told in the song "I Burn". While he envisioned "I Burn" to be a story about cult members immolating themselves in order to ascend to a higher plane, "Possum Kingdom" was about one of the immolated people becoming "just smoke, and ...he goes to Possum Kingdom [Lake] and tries to find somebody to join him."

Most of the song alternates between a 7/4 and an 8/4 time signature.

== Music video ==
The music video for "Possum Kingdom" was directed by Thomas Mignone and his film production company DOOM Incorporated and begins with a body bag being dragged from a lake, then pans to the lead singer, Vaden Todd Lewis, singing in a dark room. It then pans to a shot of the band performing in a small venue with several dozen dancing fans. The individual who dragged the body bag from the river then opens it and begins violently hacking away at it. The video ends by revealing the individual is actually an ice sculptor that is creating the image of a beautiful woman. A drop of water is seen streaming down her face. Filming was done for the stage scene at a small venue, run by Brannon Richards and Kevin Hurnden, called The Crossing. The walls of the film set were built on rollers which were slowly wheeled closer and closer during multiple takes, creating a claustrophobic vibe for the performance space. The video caused controversy when several reels of footage were lost by a production assistant and ended up with the Dallas Police Department, who mistakenly misinterpreted the imagery as a possible 'snuff' film. Mignone met with several police detectives and had to screen multiple takes of the footage for them. He was originally ordered to pay a fine for misuse of police resources but the fine was ultimately waived.

== Track listing ==
Promo single
No.	Title	Length
1.	"Possum Kingdom" (Edit Version)	4:11
2.	"Possum Kingdom" (LP Version)	5:08

Live single
No.	Title	Length
1.	"Possum Kingdom" (live; with intro)	5:36
2.	"Possum Kingdom" (live; without intro)	5:23
3.	"Santacide"	4:43

Tracks 1 and 2 recorded live September 22, 1995 at the Complex in Dallas, Texas.

== Charts ==
=== Weekly charts ===
Chart (1995)	Peak position
Canada Rock/Alternative (RPM)	3
US Hot 100 Airplay (Billboard)	40
US Album Rock Tracks (Billboard)	9
US Modern Rock Tracks (Billboard)	4

=== Year-end charts ===
Chart (1995)	Position
Canada Rock/Alternative (RPM)	12
US Album Rock Tracks (Billboard)	18
US Modern Rock Tracks (Billboard)	25

Chart (1996)	Position
US Mainstream Rock Tracks (Billboard)	74
US Modern Rock Tracks (Billboard)	61

== In other media ==
Possum Kingdom was included in the setlist for the Xbox 360 edition of Guitar Hero II.

In season 2, episode 2 of Reacher, the song is played while Reacher and his crew are driving.

Possum Kingdom was played in season 3, episode 4 of the Apple TV series For All Mankind.

Possum Kingdom was used in the D23 Brazil trailer for the Marvel Cinematic Universe film Thunderbolts* (2025).
