= Mike Ruocco =

American singer

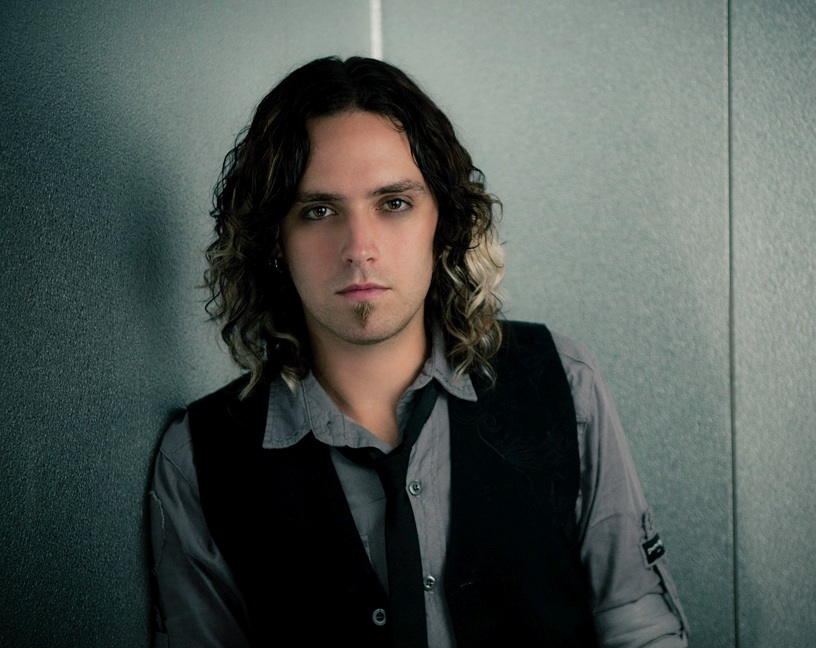

Background information
- Origin: Baltimore, MD
- Genres: Rock, pop
- Years active: 1995–present
- Label: Independent
- Website: www.mikeruocco.com

Mike Ruocco is a Baltimore, Maryland-based pop-rock artist.

== History ==
Baltimore, MD bred Michael Ruocco is a singer, songwriter. Inspired by the likes of Def Leppard to get up on stage, he started his first band, PLUNGE, at age 12 with school friends. The band took their budding career seriously and grew into one of the busiest cover/original bands in the mid-atlantic music scene. PLUNGE first signed to European and Japanese labels before releasing their album “Hometown Hero” independently in the USA. Shortly after “Hometown Hero” came out, Mike was invited to join another hometown act, SR-71 – recently signed to RCA Records. He joined the band as a bassist/background vocalist while maintaining work with PLUNGE in his time off. In 2004 Mike returned to PLUNGE and the band signed with Union Entertainment Group (Nickelback, Hinder, Candlebox) manager John Greenberg. They shortly thereafter signed a deal with Columbia Records. Mike then began co-writing with different artists and producers such as Stacy Jones, SR-71 singer Mitch Allan, Holly Knight, Jack Blades, Jani Lane, Duff McKagan, Matt Sorum, John Corabi and many others. His collaborations with Aerosmith Producer/Co-writer Marti Frederiksen created a lasting musical bond. Changes at Columbia Records prevented their debut album from ever being made. Their move to EMI Records was made through Chairman David Munns himself. Mike and Frederiksen began work on “Superhuman” in 2006. Upon its completion in 2007, Cinder Road was born. They toured with Kiss and Chris Daughtry, among others. In 2009 Mike was signed to a publishing deal at Bug Music in LA where he works as a staff songwriter. With Producer/Song Writer Scott Stevens (Formerly of The Exies) he recorded the follow-up album entitled "Damage Control" with his CINDER ROAD cohorts and it was released in Japan only in 2010. The band embarked on a Sold-Out tour of Japan in support of Michael Jackson Guitarist "Orianthi" in December 2010. Mike is currently recording songs that he will pair with selected songs from “Damage Control” to release as a solo album in 2012 [which appears to have never been released]. Cinder Road played many shows for the US military. (See press section.)

== Discography ==
=== In SR71 ===
Date of release	Title	Label	US Billboard peak	US sales
October 22, 2002	Tomorrow	RCA	138	
May 4, 2004	Here We Go Again	Crown Japan		

=== As Plunge ===
- Understand (2002)
1. "Understand" - 3:01
2. "Hope" - 3:21
3. "If I" - 3:03
4. "Through Your Eyes" - 3:27
5. "Better Days" - 3:41
6. "The Way" - 3:03
- Hometown Hero (2004)
1. "Running Away" - 2:53 (Crown, 2004)
2. "Wasted on Your Love" - 3:37 (Crown, 2004)
3. "Hometown Hero" - 3:06 (Crown, 2004)
4. "Part Time Girlfriend" - 3:05 (Crown, 2004)
5. "Scared" - 3:35 (Crown, 2004)
6. "Fall Into One" - 3:24 (Crown, 2004)
7. "Ordinary Girl" - 2:36 (Crown, 2004)
8. "One More Time" - 3:13 (Crown, 2004)
9. "Stuck in Madison" - 2:39 (Crown, 2004)
10. "Understand" - 2:59 (Crown, 2004)
11. "Hope" - 3:03 (Crown, 2004)
12. "Heaven" - 3:57 (Crown, 2004)
13. "Stiff Competition" - 4:04 (Bonus Track)

=== As Plunge and Cinder Road ===
- Stand in Our Way EP (2007)
1. "Everything You Are" - 3:37
2. "Stand in Our Way" - 4:09

=== As Cinder Road ===
- Superhuman (2007)
1. "I'm So Sorry" - 3:12
2. "Bad Excuse" - 3:20
3. "Back Home to You" - 3:36
4. "Should've Known Better" - 3:39
5. "Get In Get Out" - 3:49
6. "Learning to Love" - 3:39
7. "Feels So Good to Me" - 3:32
8. "Superhuman" - 3:39
9. "One" - 4:17
10. "Drift Away" - 3:50
11. "Don't Be Scared" - 3:35
12. "Sleeping With The Enemy" * - 3:12
13. "Complete Me" * - 2:47
14. "Stand In Our Way" * - 4:08
15. "Everything You Are" * - 3:35
16. "#1 Fan" * - 3:47
- * = bonus track on Japanese edition
- Damage Control (2010) - Can be Ordered from CinderRoadMusic.com > "Merch"

1. "The Worst Way" - 3:29
2. "Sex Addict" - 3:39
3. "Losing Ground" - 3:32
4. "It Hurts" - 3:34
5. "Save Me" - 2:58
6. "More" - 3:28
7. "Giving Up" - 3:47
8. "Breaking Me" - 3:13
9. "2 Hearts 2 Break" - 3:34
10. "Tennessee" - 3:33
11. "I Don't Wanna" - 3:42
12. "The Devil Made Me Do It" - 3:12
13. "Without You" - 4:00

=== Press ===
- MAY THE ROCK BE WITH YOU interview with Mike-
- CINDER ROAD PLAY FOR THE MILITARY –
- Mike's TUNELAB interview –
- Mike interview on The Hot Zone –
- Cinder Road album review -
