= SR-71 (band) =

American rock band

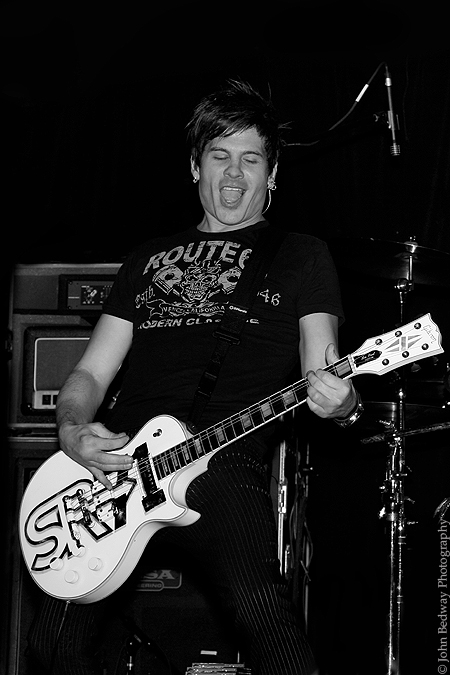
- Singer Mitch Allan performing in 2009

Background information
- Origin: Baltimore, Maryland, U.S.
- Genres: Punk rock; pop-punk; power pop; alternative rock
- Years active: 1998–2005, 2009
- Labels: Sony BMG; RCA; Crown Japan
- Past members: Mitch Allan; John Allen; Pat DeMent; Mike Ruocco; Mark Beauchemin; Jeff Reid; Dan Garvin
- Website: www.sr71music.com

SR-71 was an American rock band formed in Baltimore, Maryland, in 1998. They are best known for their 2000 single "Right Now", their 2002 single "Tomorrow", and as the original authors of Bowling for Soup's 2004 hit "1985" (which was released first on their album Here We Go Again). The name of the band came from SR-71 Blackbird, a supersonic surveillance aircraft of the United States Air Force. The band was originally known as Honor Among Thieves and Radiostar, and as was later the case with SR-71, lead singer and rhythm guitarist Mitch Allan was the only constant member.

== History ==
=== Early years and Now You See Inside (1998–2001) ===
The band was formed in 1998, as a continuation project for frontman Mitch Allan after the demise of his previous band, Honor Among Thieves. The band chose the name "SR-71" because all the members' parents came from the United States Air Force. The band was quickly signed to RCA Records, where they recorded their debut album, titled Now You See Inside, which was released on June 20, 2000, and produced by David Bendeth (Underoath, Killswitch Engage), Gil Norton (Foo Fighters, Pixies) and John Shanks (Unwritten Law, Jane's Addiction). The album proved successful for the unknown band, and peaked at number 81 on the Billboard 200 and number 2 on the Billboard Heatseekers Chart. The album spawned the band's debut hit single, which remains the band's only hit single to date, "Right Now". Written by frontman Mitch Allan and songwriter Butch Walker from a raw script purchased for $1,500 from a friend, it reached number 2 on the Modern Rock Tracks chart, number 102 on the Billboard Hot 100 and number 38 on the Mainstream Rock Tracks.

The band's original drummer, Dan Garvin, left the band soon after the supporting tour of the album, to join alternative rock outfit Nine Days while their drummer was unable to perform on the supporting tour for The Madding Crowd.

=== Tomorrow, lineup and label changes (2002–2003) ===
All of 2002, the band recorded their follow-up to Now You See Inside. In the recording sessions for the album, they recorded a cover of the Dazz Band song "Let It Whip" for the soundtrack of the movie The New Guy.

Their second studio album, entitled Tomorrow, was released on October 22, 2002, and was produced by Neal Avron (Fall Out Boy, Yellowcard), Butch Walker (American Hi-Fi, Avril Lavigne), Bendeth and frontman Mitch Allan himself. On this album, Mitch Allan contributed songwriting to all the songs in the album, with most of them written only by him, except a few, written along with Butch Walker, Kevin Kadish, and the other members of the band. It was the band's first album with new drummer John Allen.

The album was much darker, and proved to be less successful than its predecessor, only peaking at number 138 on the Billboard 200. The first single "Tomorrow", reached only number 18 on the Modern Rock Tracks chart, which was far less successful than "Right Now's" number 2 peak. The song "My World" was later recorded for American Idol runner-up Bo Bice's debut album, The Real Thing, where frontman Mitch Allan played guitar and bass on. The song "Goodbye" was used by WWE as the theme song for the 2004 edition of WWE No Way Out.

Despite the commercial failure, RCA still heavily promoted a supporting tour for the album from late 2002 until 2003. The tour also proved unsuccessful. Soon tensions began to arise in the band, resulting in the departure of guitarist Mark Beauchemin after the end of the tour in 2003. Bassist Jeff Reid also left at this time, due to lung cancer, which he died from the following year. Mark Beauchemin went on playing guitar for soft rock artist Vanessa Carlton.

The band was then joined by new members guitarist Pat DeMent and bassist Mike Ruocco, only to be dropped by RCA not long afterward.

=== Here We Go Again and decline in popularity (2003–2005) ===
Though without a label at the time, the band went on to record an album of new material by themselves, during mid to late 2003. All songwriting on the album was done by Mitch Allan, with the exception of two tracks co-written by drummer John Allen, and one old-penned hidden track co-written a year earlier by Kevin Kadish. All production, mixing and mastering was also done by Mitch Allan.

In 2004, the band finally found a new label, a Japanese label under the name Crown Japan, who released their third album, Here We Go Again, on May 21, 2004, in Japan only. The album was available outside Japan only through imports on the band's official website. The album gained little attention and entered no charts, proving to be, again, a commercial flop. Despite that, one song on the album, "1985", was then re-recorded by the band's close friends Bowling for Soup for their album A Hangover You Don't Deserve, released later in 2004. "1985" was released as a single and reached number 23 on the Billboard Hot 100. Frontman Mitch Allan and drummer John Allen were still credited for the song on the Bowling for Soup album and single, along with Bowling for Soup frontman Jaret Reddick. It was former SR-71 producer and collaborator Butch Walker who produced the album and single. Mitch Allan also had a cameo in BFS's music video for "1985".

The album's title track "Here We Go Again" was also re-recorded in 2006, by pop punk band JParis for their album Call It What You Want. Mitch Allan has produced the band's album and was credited as the writer of this song.

The first song on the album, "Axl Rose", was released as a single later, with "Here We Go Again" and "All American" as B-sides. The Peter Gabriel cover "In Your Eyes" was also released a single, and played frequently during the 2004–05 tour by the band.

=== Hiatus and brief reunion (2006–2010) ===
Though the band still played some dates in 2005, it stayed inactive since, with Mitch Allan starting to play small solo club shows around 2006. At his solo shows, he played SR-71 songs, as well as some previously unreleased solo material, including a new fan favorite song called "Superman". Allan then announced that he started working on his first solo album. He said the album will be called Clawing My Way to the Middle and released in late 2007, with sessions commencing in Los Angeles and Baltimore in the spring of 2006 with record producer Ben Moody. Since it was announced the album would be released in late 2007, it was pushed back a few times in 2008 and 2009, and now it is unknown when or if the album will be released.

Allan kept playing solo club shows around the Hollywood area through 2007, when the band announced that they will be officially going into an indefinite hiatus after one last show in Henderson, Nevada, on August 18, 2007, at the Sunset Station, along with Vertical Horizon, Nine Days and Marcy Playground.

While keeping a low profile on performances, Mitch Allan has worked as a songwriter and record producer with many artists including Lindsay Lohan, Lovehammers, Daughtry, Hilary Duff, Faith Hill, Backstreet Boys and more. In 2007, Allan received a Latin Grammy Award nomination for co-writing the song "Bella Traición" for Mexican teen sensation Belinda. Also in 2007, SR-71 won the Brit Award for Best International Breakthrough Act.

In January 2008, Mitch Allan released his debut single with a music video on his Myspace page. The song, titled "Make Me High" was a soft remake of an old SR-71 song called "My World", from their 2002 album Tomorrow. Allan has also said that the SR-71 song "Mosquito" from their 2004 album Here We Go Again will also be re-recorded for his solo album. Allan said he was working with his former SR-71 bandmates on his solo album. There has since been no news of the album's production since then.

In 2009, Allan launched a weekly event in Hollywood where he and other notable songwriters meet up and play covers and original tunes acoustically to small crowds. Allan was then involved, along with former Evanescence guitarist Ben Moody in a new contest for finding a teen singer sensation. That same year, drummer John Allen was involved as the lead singer of the new hard rock band Charm City Devils. The band toured as part of Mötley Crüe's Crüe Fest 2 tour in summer 2009. Their first album, Let's Rock and Roll, included one song co-written and produced by Mitch Allan.

On July 25, 2009, the band reunited for a one-off performance at the Wicker Park Bucktown Arts and Music Festival in Chicago, playing a full set on the Center Stage. On October 13, 2009, Mitch Allan announced on his Myspace page that SR-71 will be playing another one-off reunion show at the Bourbon Street in hometown Baltimore, Maryland, on November 25, 2009. Alternative rock act Cinder Road supported them on this date. During the band's show, drummer John Allen stepped to the front and traded duties with frontman Mitch Allan, to sing "Best of the Worst", a song he co-wrote with Mitch Allan for his other band Charm City Devils, which members also got on stage to play the song.

On October 22, 2010, Allan, through his Twitter account, revealed that SR-71's third album, Here We Go Again, would finally be released in the United States. On Thanksgiving Day, 2010, the album was made available as a digital download, with a reordered tracklist. The original album tracks were remastered and three live bonus tracks were added.

== Musical style and influences ==
SR-71 has been categorized as punk rock, pop-punk,, power pop and alternative rock. AllMusic described the band's recordings as "jaunty punk songs with a corporate rock edge," as well as "quick swirling three chord loops." The band has drawn comparisons to blink-182 and Less Than Jake. The band's album Now You See Inside was described as pop punk and pop rock. Their second album, Tomorrow, has been described as nu metal.

SR-71 cites the Beatles, Queen, Sum 41, U2, the Clash, Sex Pistols, Third Eye Blind, Stone Temple Pilots, the Who, the Police, and Duran Duran as influences.

The band is named after a high-speed military jet of the same name. All of the band's members have parents who have served in the United States Air Force at some point in their lives. Lead singer Mitch Allan has stated that he does not like the number in the band's name: "I couldn't stand the fact that we had a number in our name with everyone else — even with Blink-182, who are cool. You don't think about everybody else when you make a decision as important as a name."

== Members ==
Final lineup

- Mitch Allan – lead vocals, rhythm guitar (1998–2005, 2009)
- John Allen – drums, percussion, backing vocals (2001–2005, 2009)
- Pat DeMent – lead guitar, backing vocals (2003–2005, 2009)
- Mike Ruocco – bass, backing vocals (2003–2005, 2009)

Former members

- Mark Beauchemin – lead guitar, keyboards, backing vocals (1998–2003)
- Jeff Reid – bass, keyboards, backing vocals (1998–2003; died 2004)
- Dan Garvin – drums, percussion, backing vocals (1998–2001)

Timeline

== Discography ==
=== Studio albums ===
Year	Album details	US Billboard 200	Certification
2000	Now You See Inside: Released: June 20, 2000; Label: RCA	81	RIAA: Gold
2002	Tomorrow: Released: October 22, 2002; Label: RCA	138	
2004	Here We Go Again: Released: May 4, 2004; Label: Crown Japan		

=== Compilation appearances ===
- Cool Traxx! 2 (2000) – "Last Man on the Moon"
- Listen to What the Man Said (2001) – "My Brave Face"
- Loser Soundtrack (2000) – "Right Now"
- A Very Special Christmas 5 (2001) – "Christmas Is the Time to Say I Love You"
- Splashdown Soundtrack (2001) – "Right Now"
- Crossing All Over Vol. 13 (2001) – "Right Now"
- The New Guy Soundtrack (2002) – "Let It Whip"
- Slap Her... She's French (2002) – "Right Now"

=== Singles ===
List of singles, with selected chart positions, showing year released and album name
Title	Year	Peak chart positions					Album
Title	Year	US	US Alt.	US Main. Rock	CAN Alt	GER	Album
"Right Now"^{[A]}	2000	102	2	38	23	73	Now You See Inside
"Politically Correct"	2001	—	22	—	—	—	Now You See Inside
"Another Night Alone"	2001	—	—	—	—	—	Now You See Inside
"Tomorrow"	2002	—	18	—	—	—	Tomorrow
"Goodbye"	2002	—	—	—	—	—	Tomorrow
"Axl Rose"	2004	—	—	—	—	—	Here We Go Again
"—" denotes singles that were not released, or did not chart.

Notes

- A. "Right Now" peaked outside of the top 100 in the US Billboard Hot 100, therefore they are listed on the Bubbling Under Hot 100 Singles.
