= A Hangover You Don't Deserve =

Studio album by Bowling for Soup
- Released: September 14, 2004
- Recorded: 2004
- Studios: Ruby Red Productions (Atlanta, Georgia); Valve Studios (Dallas, Texas)
- Genres: Pop-punk; power pop
- Length: 58:23
- Labels: Jive; FFROE; Zomba
- Producers: Russ-T Cobb; Jaret Reddick; Butch Walker; Casey Diiorio

Bowling for Soup chronology
Drunk Enough to Dance (2002)	A Hangover You Don't Deserve (2004)	Bowling for Soup Goes to the Movies (2005)

Bowling for Soup studio chronology
Drunk Enough to Dance (2002)	A Hangover You Don't Deserve (2004)	The Great Burrito Extortion Case (2006)

Singles from A Hangover You Don't Deserve
- 1. "1985" Released: July 27, 2004; 2. "Almost" Released: January 4, 2005; 3. "Ohio (Come Back to Texas)" Released: November 17, 2005

A Hangover You Don't Deserve is the fifth studio album by American rock band Bowling for Soup. It was released on September 14, 2004, as their third album with Jive Records. The first single, "1985", quickly became a Top 40 staple, peaking at No. 5 on Billboard's Adult Top 40 chart.

The album's name came from lead guitarist Chris Burney, who was also the name inspiration for the band's previous effort, Drunk Enough to Dance.

== Background and recording ==
After the success of the band's previous release, Drunk Enough to Dance, especially with the single "Girl All the Bad Guys Want" earning a Grammy nomination, the band were given a higher budget and confidence from their label Jive Records, thus giving them more freedom for the recording sessions.

Producer Butch Walker, who worked on their previous effort, teamed up with the band again, co-writing and producing three tracks with singer Jaret Reddick. However, Reddick would then ultimately decide to have Walker work on the pre-production instead, with himself and engineer Russ-T Cobb handling most of the production.

"Almost" was meant to be the first single off the album. However, the band would receive a call from Walker's manager, who suggested the band cover the SR-71 song "1985", which was only available in Japan on their third album Here We Go Again. Upon hearing the song, Reddick felt the subject matter didn't meet the band's criteria, so he asked SR-71 frontman Mitch Allan if he could make changes to the song, to which Allan said yes.

== Release and reception ==
Professional ratings
Review scores
Source	Rating
AllMusic	3/5 stars
Entertainment Weekly	C+
Melodic	3/5 stars
PopMatters	6/10

The album's lead single, "1985", released on July 27, 2004, and upon release, charted no. 23 on the US Billboard Hot 100, with a no. 10 peak on the US Pop Airplay chart. The album released on September 14, 2004, peaking at no. 37 on the US Billboard 200. The album's second single, "Almost" released on January 4, 2005, charting no. 45 on the Hot 100 and no. 1 on the UK OCC Rock & Metal Singles chart. The third and final single, "Ohio (Come Back to Texas)", released on November 17, 2005. The album, alongside the single "Almost," were certified Gold by the RIAA in 2005, while "1985" was certified 2× Platinum in 2019.

Johnny Loftus, writing for AllMusic, praised the catchability of the first three tracks and Jaret Reddick's songwriting on songs like "Ohio (Come Back to Texas)", but was critical of the album containing typical pop punk production ("stuff like piano breaks, compressed vocals, and steppe farm chorus guitars") that made the band sound too close to similar bands like Goldfinger and Lit, saying that "most of the time it's very hard to hear Bowling for Soup around Hangover's radio and video-ready sheen." Entertainment Weekly writer Brian Hiatt felt that tracks like "1985" were not enough to sustain a whole album, saying that, "Like a lower-SATs version of Fountains of Wayne, the Texas quartet tries to write silly/clever lyrics to go atop their high-carb pop melodies. But too much of the humor (rhyming "Miss Texas" with "bigger breast-es"?) functions on a Jackass: The Band level."

== Legacy ==
"Ohio (Come Back to Texas)" was used as a Wake-Up Call on Day 10 of NASA’s Space Shuttle Discovery's final mission, STS-133, at the request of the crew, on March 5, 2011.

From mid-2024 to early 2025, the band embarked on "A Hangover You Don't Deserve 20th Anniversary Tour", where they performed the album in its entirety. On October 24, 2025, the band released the live album A Hangover You Definitely Deserve, which was recorded during the tour's show in Manchester.

== Track listing ==
All tracks are written by Jaret Reddick, with additional songwriters listed.

No.	Title	Writer(s)	Length
1.	"Almost"	Butch Walker	3:27
2.	"Trucker Hat"	Walker	3:01
3.	"1985"	Mitch Allan; John Allen	3:13
4.	"Get Happy"	Zac Maloy	2:57
5.	"Ohio (Come Back to Texas)"	Maloy; Ted Bruner	3:51
6.	"Ridiculous"	Casey Diiorio	3:58
7.	"Shut-Up and Smile"	Maloy	4:03
8.	"Last Call Casualty"	Walker	3:32
9.	"Next Ex-Girlfriend"	Jeff Coplan	3:26
10.	"A-Hole"	Miles Zuniga	3:57
11.	"My Hometown"		3:02
12.	"Smoothie King"	Maloy	4:02
13.	"Sad Sad Situation"	Zuniga; Tony Scalzo	2:26
14.	"Really Might Be Gone"		3:43
15.	"Down for the Count"		3:37
16.	"Two-Seater"	Maloy	3:55
17.	"Friends O' Mine"	Zuniga; Scalzo	2:18
18.	"Ohio" (Reprise)	Maloy; Bruner	7:17
19.	"Belgium" (Boy Band Remix)		5:15
Total length:			58:23

Each version of the album, excluding the DualDisc version, has a number of tracks that are four to five seconds of complete silence, titled "[Blank]", between the last song and "Ohio (Reprise)". The number of tracks varies upon the version, but "Ohio (Reprise)" and "Belgium (Boy Band Remix)" are tracks 43 and 44 respectively on all versions.

UK edition
No.	Title	Length
18.	"Somebody Get My Mum" (not on first pressing)	3:20
Total length:		61:43

Japanese edition
No.	Title	Length
18.	"Somebody Get My Mum"	3:20
19.	"Bipolar" (also appears on the Australian "1985" single and U.K. "1985" Single 1)	2:39
Total length:		64:22

=== DualDisc version ===
CD side

- Tracks 1–17 of standard edition

DVD side

- Entire album in 5.1 Surround Sound (including "Ohio (Reprise)" and "Belgium" (Boy Band Remix) as tracks 18 and 19 respectively)
- Entire album In Stereo PCM
- "1985" (video)
- "Almost" (video)
- "Ridiculous" (video)
- "Two-Seater" (acoustic) (video from RollingStone.com Originals)

=== B-sides ===
No.	Title	Length
1.	"Major Denial" (released on the Australian and UK "1985" Single 1 and 2)	2:25
2.	"Make It Up to You" (released on the Australian "1985" single and UK "1985" 7" vinyl)	3:53
3.	"Girl All the Bad Guys Want (Kerrang! Radio Session)" (released on UK "Almost" single)	3:27
4.	"Undertow" (released on Bowling for Soup Goes to the Movies)	3:31

== Personnel ==
Bowling for Soup

- Jaret Reddick – lead vocals, guitars
- Erik Chandler – bass, vocals
- Chris Burney – guitars, vocals
- Gary Wiseman – drums, percussion

Production

- Russ-T Cobb – producer (tracks 4–7, 9–15, 17), engineer, mixing (all tracks except 16)
- Jaret Reddick – producer (tracks 4–17)
- Butch Walker – producer (tracks 1–3, 8)
- Casey Diiorio – producer, mixing (track 16)
- Sean Loughlin – assistant engineer
- Christie Priode – project coordinator
- Tom Lord-Alge – mixing (tracks 1 and 3)
- Chaz Harper – mastering
- Jason Janik – album photography

Additional musicians/backing vocals

- Butch Walker
- Russ-T Cobb
- Joey Huffman
- Jeff "FFroe" Roe
- Howie
- Sim Klugerman
- Sean Loughlin
- JT Hall
- Shelly Truesdell
- Candice Leigh Andrews
- Sybil Summers as the "ex" in "Down for the Count"

Locations

- Recorded and mixed at Ruby Red Productions (Atlanta, Georgia) & Valve Studios (Dallas, Texas)
- Mixed at South Beach Studios (Miami, Florida)
- Mastered at Battery Mastering (NYC)

== Charts ==
=== Weekly charts ===
2004 weekly chart performance for A Hangover You Don't Deserve
Chart (2004)	Peak position
Australian Hitseekers Albums (ARIA)	20
Canadian Albums (Nielsen SoundScan)	89
Scottish Albums (Official Charts)	65
UK Albums (Official Charts)	64
UK Rock & Metal Albums (Official Charts)	2
US Billboard 200	37

2025 weekly chart performance for A Hangover You Don't Deserve
Chart (2025)	Peak position
UK Album Sales (OCC)	92
UK Independent Albums (Official Charts)	32

=== Year-end charts ===
Year-end chart performance for A Hangover You Don't Deserve
Chart (2005)	Position
US Billboard 200	185

== Certifications ==
Certifications for A Hangover You Don't Deserve
Region	Certification	Certified units/sales
United Kingdom (BPI)	Silver	60,000^{‡}
United States (RIAA)	Gold	500,000^{^}
^{^} Shipments figures based on certification alone.^{‡} Sales+streaming figures based on certification alone.
