= Satellite (American band) =

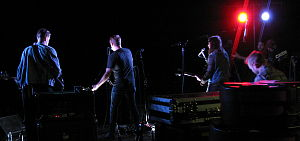
- Satellite playing at the WBJB Summer Concert Series on the beach in Belmar, NJ, August 15, 2013.

Background information
- Origin: Nashville, Tennessee, United States; Los Angeles, California, United States
- Genres: Alternative rock; power pop
- Years active: 2010–present
- Labels: Sony; Descendant
- Members: Steven McMorran; Vincent DiCarlo; Darren Rayl
- Past members: Erik Kertes; Mitch Allan; Justin Glasco; Josh Dunahoo
- Website: Official website

Satellite is an American alternative rock band from Los Angeles, California, and Nashville, Tennessee, formed by Steven McMorran, Josh Dunahoo, and Mitch Allan in June 2010.

== History ==
Satellite was formed around songs written by lead singer, Steven McMorran and produced by Mitch Allan with Josh Dunahoo.

Satellite began forming in early 2009 when Steven McMorran was invited to play at music producer Mitch Allan's Los Angeles-based "songwriter's night". They became a band a month later when Josh Dunahoo was added.

The collaboration project was official announced in June 2010, under the name of Satellite, with band members including McMorran, Allan, Dunahoo and drummer Justin Glasco, who later left the band as a sought after producer. In 2011, Erik Kertes joined the band as the new bassist to allow McMorran to switch to guitar.

The band released its first EP Ring the Bells on July 24, 2010. The EP being a mix of mellow alternative rock and power pop, with influences such as Paul Simon, Bruce Springsteen, Radiohead, and Snow Patrol. The EP has been critically acclaimed by Radar Online, Alternative Press, Kings of A&R, and The LA Examiner. The band supported the release of the EP with a music video for the first single "Say the Words" and some dates performing live around the Los Angeles area, with their first date as a full band being on August 14, 2010, at the Saint Rocke in Hermosa Beach. Satellite recently completed its forthcoming debut album, Calling-Birds, set to be released February 2013 on Descendant Records/Sony Music Entertainment.

Frontman Steven McMorran has a creative history of collaborating with everyone from Weezer's Rivers Cuomo to Joe Cocker and Every Avenue. McMorran recently collaborated with Cuomo on his English-Japanese self-titled LP called, Scott & Rivers. McMorran co-wrote the first track, "Break Free", stating, "The best part about that experience was seeing how he built this story that we sort of outlined together... and I got to hear the word 'perambulations' fit perfectly into a verse."

== Discography ==
- Ring the Bells (2010)
- Calling-Birds (2013)
