= Something to Listen To =

Something to Listen To may refer to:

- Something to Listen To (Jimmy McGriff album), 1970
- Something to Listen To (Nine Days album), 1995
