= Politically Correct (disambiguation) =

Political correctness is language, ideas, policies, or behaviour seeking to minimize offense to groups of people.

Politically Correct may also refer to:

- "Politically Correct" (song), a single released in 2000 by the American rock band SR-71
- Politically Correct Bedtime Stories, book by James Finn Garner, published in 1994
- "Political Correctness" (Stewart Lee's Comedy Vehicle), a TV episode
- PCU (film), a 1994 comedy film, "Politically Correct University"

== See also ==
- Politically incorrect (disambiguation)
