= Lizzie McGuire: Total Party! =

Soundtrack album by Various artists
- Released: August 31, 2004
- Genre: Pop
- Label: Walt Disney

Lizzie McGuire: Total Party! is a soundtrack album released as a tie-in to the Lizzie McGuire TV series. It includes songs from Pink, Vitamin C, A*Teens, Jesse McCartney and Atomic Kitten.

== Track listing ==
1. "Theme to Lizzie McGuire" (Extended Supa Mix) – Angie Jaree
2. "Perfect Day" (Sunshine Mix) - Hoku
3. "Crush'n" - Jesse McCartney
4. "Get the Party Started" (Radio Disney Mix) - P!nk
5. "Dancing Queen" - A*Teens
6. "No More (Baby I'ma Do Right)" - 3LW
7. "Ladies Night" - Atomic Kitten
8. "1-2-3" - Nikki Cleary
9. "That's What Girls Do" - No Secrets
10. "Hey Now (Girls Just Wanna Have Fun)" - Triple Image featuring Jamie Lynn Spears
11. "Smile" - Vitamin C
12. "Absolutely (Story of a Girl)" - Nine Days
13. "Us Against The World" - Play
14. "C'est la Vie" - B*Witched

Bonus Karaoke Instrumentals
15. "I Can't Wait"
16. "Hey Now (Girls Just Wanna Have Fun)"
17. "Get the Party Started" (Radio Disney Mix)

== Charts ==
Chart (2004)	Peak position
US Billboard 200	146
US Billboard Kid Albums	2
US Billboard Top Soundtracks	10
