= Tomorrow (SR-71 song) =

Single by SR-71

from the album Tomorrow
- Released: August 2002
- Genre: Nu metal
- Length: 3:48
- Label: RCA
- Songwriter: Mitch Allan
- Producers: Butch Walker; Mitch Allan; SR-71

SR-71 singles chronology
"Another Night Alone" (2001)	"Tomorrow" (2002)	"My World" (2003)

"Tomorrow" is a single from the second album, also titled Tomorrow, by the American rock band SR-71. The song was a change from the pop-punk focus of their first album, Now You See Inside, as part of "a conscious effort to write a lot of positive songs", according to singer Mitch Allan. The song peaked at 18 at the Billboard Modern Rock Tracks chart.

== Charts ==
Chart (2002)	Peak position
U.S. Modern Rock Tracks	18
