= Ohio (Come Back to Texas) =

Bowling for Soup song

Single by Bowling for Soup

from the album A Hangover You Don't Deserve
- Released: November 17, 2005
- Recorded: 2004
- Studio: Ruby Red Productions; Atlanta
- Genre: Pop-punk
- Length: 3:50
- Label: FFROE, Jive, Zomba
- Songwriters: Jaret Reddick, Zac Maloy, Ted Bruner
- Producers: Russ-T Cobb, Jaret Reddick

Bowling for Soup singles chronology
"Almost" (2005)	"Ohio (Come Back to Texas)" (2005)	"High School Never Ends" (2006)

"Ohio (Come Back to Texas)" is a song by American pop-punk band Bowling for Soup, released as a single from the group's album A Hangover You Don't Deserve (2004).

The song was used as a Wake-Up Call on Day 10 of the Space Shuttle Discovery's final mission, STS-133, at the request of the crew, on March 5, 2011.

== Content ==
The singer's girlfriend leaves him after meeting another man at the bank and moves with him to Cleveland. The singer implores her to come back home to him and the distinctively Texan things she left behind in Denton County, Texas.

== Charts ==
Chart (2005)	Peak position
US Pop 100 (Billboard)	59
US Mainstream Top 40 (Billboard)	35
