= Hot Potato Soup =

Hot Potato Soup may refer to:

- "Hot Potato Soup" (Agents of S.H.I.E.L.D.)
- Hot Potato Soup (ApologetiX album)
