= Brand New Me =

Brand New Me or A Brand New Me may refer to:

== Music ==
- "Brand New Me", a 1968 song by Lesley Gore
- A Brand New Me (Dusty Springfield album), 1970
  - "Brand New Me" (Dusty Springfield song), a single from the album
- "Brand New Me", a song on the 1970 The Partridge Family Album
- "Brand New Me", a song on the 1984 Country Boy (Ricky Skaggs album)
- A Brand New Me, a 2000 album by Cecilia Cheung (born 1980)
- Brand New Me (John Michael Montgomery album) (including the title song), 2000
- A Brand New Me (James "J.T." Taylor album) (including the title song), 2000
- "Brand New Me", a single from the 2006 self-named album by Hometown News
- "Brand New Me", a bonus track on the 2007 deluxe edition of Coco (album) by Colbie Caillat
- "Brand New Me", a song on the 2007 album Slow Motion Life (Part One) by Nine Days
- Brand New Me, a 2008 album by Gregory Isaacs (1951– 2010)
- A Brand New Me, a 2009 album by Pasquale Esposito
- Brand New Me, a 2010 album (including the title song) by Cory Morrow (born 1972)
- "Brand New Me", a 2010 single by Anna Sundstrand (born 1989)
- "Brand New Me" (Alicia Keys song), 2012
- Brand New Me (EP), a 2012 extended play by rapper MC Jin
- "A Brand New Me", a song on the 2012 album Blossomy by S.H.E.
- A Brand New Me (Aretha Franklin album), 2017
- "Brand New Me" (Saint Etienne and Confidence Man song), 2025

== Other ==
- "Brand New Me", the first episode of the 2015 Australian Ready for This (TV series)
- A Brand-New Me!, a 2010 book in the Hank Zipzer children's series by Henry Winkler and Lin Oliver

== See also ==
- "You Make Me Feel Brand New" a 1974 hit by The Stylistics
