= 1985 (SR-71 song) =

2004 song by SR-71

Song by SR-71

from the album Here We Go Again
- Released: May 21, 2004
- Genre: Pop-punk; alternative rock
- Length: 3:41
- Songwriters: Mitch Allan; John Allen
- Producer: Mitch Allan

"1985" is a song by American rock band SR-71 from their third and final studio album Here We Go Again, released on May 21, 2004. It describes a middle-aged woman who longs for her past, dwells on her boring suburban lifestyle, and reflects on the massive changes that have occurred in pop culture and music since the 1980s.

Produced by the band's frontman Mitch Allan, who co-wrote it with their drummer John Allen, "1985" was not released as a single and went largely unnoticed; just two months after its release, Allan gave it to fellow pop punk band Bowling for Soup, who recorded a cover that reached No. 23 on the Billboard Hot 100 and was included on their fifth studio album A Hangover You Don't Deserve.

== Bowling for Soup version ==
=== Background ===
"1985"

Single by Bowling for Soup

from the album A Hangover You Don't Deserve
- B-side: "Major Denial"; "Bipolar"; "Make It Up to You"
- Released: July 26, 2004
- Studio: Ruby Red Productions (Atlanta)
- Genre: Pop-punk
- Length: 3:13
- Label: FFROE; Jive; Zomba; Silvertone
- Songwriters: Jaret Reddick; Mitch Allan; John Allen
- Producer: Butch Walker

Bowling for Soup singles chronology
| "Here We Go" (2004) | "1985" (2004) | "Almost" (2005) |

Music video
- ”1985" on YouTube

There are conflicting stories on how Bowling for Soup came to record a cover of the track. SR-71's website states that Bowling for Soup frontman Jaret Reddick heard the song and asked for permission to record a cover, while Bowling for Soup's website says that Allan called Reddick to suggest recording the cover. In 2010, Reddick said that the cover materialized through the two bands' association with producer Butch Walker.

Bowling for Soup made multiple changes to the lyrics. A reference to Fast Times at Ridgemont High is replaced by St. Elmo's Fire, the line "Never knew George was gay / hoped they'd hook up one day" is changed to "Thought she'd get a hand / on a member of Duran Duran", the lines "Where's her fairytale? Where's her dream? / Where's the quarterback from her high school football team? / How many times will she ask herself, 'What happened to me?'" are changed to "Where's the mini-skirt made of snakeskin? / And who's the other guy that's singing in Van Halen? / When did reality become TV? / Whatever happened to sitcoms, game shows on the radio?", and the line "(The rubber broke!)" after "What happened?" is omitted. Bowling for Soup also added the line "And when did Ozzy become an actor?" referencing Ozzy Osbourne's reality show The Osbournes.

=== Release ===
Released on July 26, 2004, the song climbed to number 23 on the US Billboard Hot 100 chart and debuted at number one on the Billboard Hot Digital Tracks chart, with 15,500 paid downloads.

=== Music video ===
The music video is directed by Ryan Smith and Frank Borin, also known as Smith n' Borin. It takes place on a neighborhood street where the character of Debbie (Joey House) tidies the lawn of her house but gets distracted by Bowling for Soup performing in their garage across the street. The band parodies the music videos for Robert Palmer's "Addicted to Love" and George Michael's "Faith", as well as the acts Run-DMC and Mötley Crüe. At the end of the video, Debbie walks across the street to the band, lets her hair down, and in a nod to Whitesnake's video for "Here I Go Again", writhes on top of a Jaguar. She continues to do this even after the song ends, until her husband calls out to ask her what she’s doing. Mitch Allan from SR-71 appears in the video as a passerby who gives the band a look of contempt.

=== Track listings ===
UK CD1 and digital download

1. "1985" – 3:14
2. "Major Denial" – 2:36

UK CD2

1. "1985"
2. "Bipolar"
3. "Major Denial"
4. "1985" (video)

UK 7-inch single

A. "1985" – 3:13
B. "Make It Up to You" – 3:52

Digital EP

1. "1985" – 3:13
2. "Bipolar" – 2:37
3. "Major Denial" – 2:22
4. "Make It Up to You" – 3:52

=== Charts ===
==== Weekly charts ====
| Chart (2004) | Peak position |
|---|---|
| Australia (ARIA) | 22 |
| Canada CHR/Pop Top 30 (Radio & Records) | 8 |
| Canada Hot AC Top 30 (Radio & Records) | 3 |
| Ireland (IRMA) | 36 |
| Scottish Singles Sales (Official Charts) | 35 |
| UK Singles (Official Charts) | 35 |
| US Billboard Hot 100 | 23 |
| US Adult Top 40 (Billboard) | 5 |
| US Mainstream Top 40 (Billboard) | 10 |

==== Year-end charts ====
| Chart (2004) | Position |
|---|---|
| US Adult Top 40 (Billboard) | 29 |
| US Mainstream Top 40 (Billboard) | 56 |

| Chart (2005) | Position |
|---|---|
| US Adult Top 40 (Billboard) | 39 |

=== Certifications ===
| Region | Certification | Certified units/sales |
|---|---|---|
| New Zealand (RMNZ) | Gold | 15,000^{‡} |
| United Kingdom (BPI) | Platinum | 600,000^{‡} |
| United States (RIAA) | 2× Platinum | 2,000,000^{‡} |
^{‡} Sales+streaming figures based on certification alone.

=== Release history ===
| Region | Date | Format(s) | Label(s) | Ref. |
|---|---|---|---|---|
| United States | July 26, 2004 | Contemporary hit radio | FFROE; Jive; Zomba; Silvertone | |
| Australia | September 20, 2004 | Digital EP | Zomba | |
| United Kingdom | September 20, 2004 | Digital EP | Zomba | |
| Australia | September 27, 2004 | Digital download | Zomba | |
| United Kingdom | September 27, 2004 | Digital download | Zomba | |
| United Kingdom | October 4, 2004 | CD | Jive | |
| Australia | October 18, 2004 | CD | Zomba | |

== Cover versions and parodies ==
Christian parody band ApologetiX released a parody titled "None Too Ladylike" on the group's Wordplay album, about Jezebel from the Bible.

The Bowling for Soup version has been covered by Richard Thompson on the live album 1000 Years of Popular Music.

On July 9, 2022, Thomas Ian Nicholas released a parody cover of "1985" titled "1999", featuring Bowling for Soup and referencing American Pie.

In 2013, Jaret Reddick re-covered the song for Munch's Make Believe Band, the band featured in Chuck E. Cheese's restaurants. In the segment, one of the characters references the voice of Chuck E. Cheese being the same as Bowling for Soup's front man.

On January 27, 2023, Davvn released a parody cover entitled "2002". The song was initially a 35-second YouTube Short posted on September 25, 2021, but was re-uploaded to TikTok the following year where it gained traction after Jaret Reddick saw it and subsequently collaborated with Davvn. The song was officially released featuring Bowling for Soup.

In 2024, Kelly Clarkson covered "1985" on the 'Kellyoke' section of The Kelly Clarkson Show.
