= Picture Perfect (Every Avenue album) =

Studio album by Every Avenue
- Released: November 3, 2009
- Recorded: 2009
- Genre: Pop punk, alternative rock, power pop
- Length: 38:25
- Label: Fearless
- Producer: Mitch Allan, Mike Green, Zack Odom, Kenneth Mount

Every Avenue chronology
Shh. Just Go with It (2008)	Picture Perfect (2009)	Bad Habits (2011)

Singles from Picture Perfect
- 1. "Tell Me I'm a Wreck" Released: August 12, 2009; 2. "For Always, Forever" Released: November 2, 2009; 3. "Picture Perfect" Released: December 17, 2009

Picture Perfect is the second studio album by American pop punk band Every Avenue, released on November 3, 2009.

== Background ==
On April 15, 2009, it was announced that drummer Michael Govaere had left the band to work on his own studio, Downbeat. Govaere was replaced by drummer Dennis Wilson.

== Release ==
Between late June and late August, the band performed on the Warped Tour. The first single from Picture Perfect, "Tell Me I'm a Wreck," was uploaded to the Every Avenue MySpace page on October 9. It was also made available to download on the iTunes Store and for free listening on Spotify. Picture Perfect was released through Fearless Records on November 3, 2009. In January 2010, the group went on a co-headlining US tour with Sparks the Rescue. They were supported by the Audition and the Summer Set. Following this, the band appeared at the Extreme Thing festival. The music video for "Tell Me I'm a Wreck" was released online on August 12. The music video for the single "Mindset" premiered on March 17, 2011.

== Track listing ==
All songs written and composed by David Strauchman and Jimmie Deeghan.

No.	Title	Length
1.	"For Always, Forever"	3:30
2.	"Mindset"	3:26
3.	"Tell Me I'm a Wreck" (written with Tim Pagnotta of Sugarcult and Mitch Allan)	3:40
4.	"Picture Perfect" (feat. Tom Higgenson of Plain White T's)	2:55
5.	"Happy the Hard Way" (written with Stacy Jones of American Hi-Fi and Mitch Allan)	3:59
6.	"Girl Like That" (written with Ryan Key of Yellowcard and Mitch Allan)	3:12
7.	"Saying Goodbye"	3:30
8.	"Finish What You Started"	3:09
9.	"I Forgive You" (written with Kara DioGuardi and Mitch Allan)	3:20
10.	"The Story Left Untold"	3:59
11.	"Clumsy Little Heart"	3:45

Bonus Track
No.	Title	Length
12.	"Until I Get Caught Red Handed"	3:58

== Personnel ==
- David Ryan Strauchman - lead vocals, piano
- Joshua Randall Withenshaw - lead guitar
- James Francis Deeghan - rhythm guitar, vocals
- Matthew Franklin Black - bass guitar, vocals
- Dennis Wilson - drums, percussion

Production

- Mitchell Allan Scherr, Mike Green, Zack Odom, Kenneth Mount - producer, mixing, mastering
