= Cinder Road =

American rock band

- Origin: Lutherville, Maryland, United States
- Genres: Hard rock, post-grunge
- Years active: 1998–2007 (as Plunge); 2007–2011 (as Cinder Road); 2013–present
- Label: EMI/Union Record
- Spinoff of: SR-71
- Members: Mike Ruocco; Chris Shucosky; Pat Dement; Mac Calvaresi; Dom Notaro
- Past members: Brian Magill; Jordan Young; Daniel Svoboda (Plunge); Nat Doegen; Eric Jung
- Website: http://www.cinderroadmusic.com

Cinder Road is an American rock band from Lutherville, Maryland, United States. Formerly known as Plunge, the band changed their name to Cinder Road. The band took their name from the street where they grew up. Cinder Road features frontman/vocalist/guitarist Mike Ruocco, guitarist Chris Shucosky, guitarist Pat Dement, drummer Mac Calvaresi, and bassist Eric Jung. Ruocco and Dement were the former members of the band SR-71.

The band toured up and down the eastern seaboard from Canada to Key West and on various overseas trips to Europe and Southeast Asia playing shows for the Armed Forces Entertainment (AFE) network in Italy, Germany, Japan, Korea, Guam, as well as other remote areas such as Greenland and the Guantanamo Bay Naval Base.

After catching the attention of Union Entertainment Group, the management team behind Nickelback, Cinder Road signed with EMI. The band worked closely with producer Marti Fredriksen (Aerosmith, Def Leppard, Ozzy Osbourne) on Superhuman, their initial release from June of 2007.

In early 2007, before the release of "Superhuman" Cinder Road began a four month sold-out tour with Chris Daughtry. Subsequently, the band went on to tour with Alice Cooper, Candlebox, Sick Puppies, Tesla, Flyleaf, Hurt, Red, and Puddle of Mudd. In May of 2008, Cinder Road won the opening spot for Kiss on Alive 35 World Tour in Europe. The tour took them to over 13 countries, performing for hundreds of thousands of new fans. Upon returning to the US, Cinder Road spent part of July 2008 on the Vans Warped Tour.

Cinder Road's first single, "Get In Get Out" peaked in the U.S. Mainstream Rock Tracks at number 31. The song also had a 14-week run at #1 on the Sirius Radio Octane Countdown. Cinder Road's first single from Damage Control, "It Hurts" peaked in the Top 20 on Japanese International Radio Charts.

When the band went on a brief hiatus in 2011, Calvaresi became the orchestra director at his old middle school, Ridgely Middle School, in Lutherville, before moving to New York City and directing further orchestras and marching drumlines.

== Line-up ==
- Mike Ruocco - Vocals/Guitar
- Chris Shucosky - Guitar/Vocals
- Pat Dement - Guitar/Vocals
- Mac Calvaresi - Drums/Percussion/Vocals
- Dom Notaro - Bass

== Discography ==
=== as Plunge ===
- Understand (2002)
1. "Understand" - 3:01
2. "Hope" - 3:21
3. "If I" - 3:03
4. "Through Your Eyes" - 3:27
5. "Better Days" - 3:41
6. "The Way" - 3:03
- Hometown Hero (2004)
1. "Running Away" - 2:53 (Crown, 2004)
2. "Wasted on Your Love" - 3:37 (Crown, 2004)
3. "Hometown Hero" - 3:06 (Crown, 2004)
4. "Part Time Girlfriend" - 3:05 (Crown, 2004)
5. "Scared" - 3:35 (Crown, 2004)
6. "Fall Into One" - 3:24 (Crown, 2004)
7. "Ordinary Girl" - 2:36 (Crown, 2004)
8. "One More Time" - 3:13 (Crown, 2004)
9. "Stuck in Madison" - 2:39 (Crown, 2004)
10. "Understand" - 2:59 (Crown, 2004)
11. "Hope" - 3:03 (Crown, 2004)
12. "Heaven" - 3:57 (Crown, 2004)
13. "Stiff Competition" - 4:04 (Bonus Track)

=== as Plunge and Cinder Road ===
- Stand in Our Way EP (2007)
1. "Everything You Are" - 3:37
2. "Stand in Our Way" - 4:09

=== as Cinder Road ===
- Superhuman (2007)
1. "I'm So Sorry" - 3:12
2. "Bad Excuse" - 3:20
3. "Back Home to You" - 3:36
4. "Should've Known Better" - 3:39
5. "Get In Get Out" - 3:49
6. "Learning to Love" - 3:39
7. "Feels So Good to Me" - 3:32
8. "Superhuman" - 3:39
9. "One" - 4:17
10. "Drift Away" - 3:50
11. "Don't Be Scared" - 3:35
12. "Sleeping With The Enemy" * - 3:12
13. "Complete Me" * - 2:47
14. "Stand In Our Way" * - 4:08
15. "Everything You Are" * - 3:35
16. "#1 Fan" * - 3:47
- * = bonus track on Japanese edition
- Damage Control (2010)

1. "The Worst Way" - 3:29
2. "Sex Addict" - 3:39
3. "Losing Ground" - 3:32
4. "It Hurts" - 3:34
5. "Save Me" - 2:58
6. "More" - 3:28
7. "Giving Up" - 3:47
8. "Breaking Me" - 3:13
9. "2 Hearts 2 Break" - 3:34
10. "Tennessee" - 3:33
11. "I Don't Wanna" - 3:42
12. "The Devil Made Me Do It" - 3:12
13. "Without You" - 4:00
