= Bad Habits (Every Avenue album) =

Studio album by Every Avenue
- Released: August 2, 2011
- Genre: Alternative rock, pop punk, pop rock, power pop
- Length: 34:20
- Label: Fearless
- Producer: Aaron Sprinkle

Every Avenue chronology
Picture Perfect (2009)	Bad Habits (2011)

Singles from Bad Habits
- 1. "Fall Apart" Released: June 28, 2011; 2. "No One But You" Released: July 19, 2011; 3. "Tie Me Down" Released: August 1, 2011; 4. "Someday, Somehow" Released: December 30, 2011; 5. "Watch the World" Released: February 16, 2012

Bad Habits is the third studio album by American pop punk band Every Avenue, released on August 2, 2011.

== Release ==
The album was announced through a YouTube video on April, 27. The song "Whatever Happened To You" was streamed on their Facebook shortly after the album announcement. The lead single, "Fall Apart", was released to radio stations on June 28, 2011. The second single "No One But You" was released on July 19, 2011, and impacted radio on August 2. The album was released on August 2, 2011, through Fearless Records. They supported Yellowcard on their headlining US tour in October and November. In February and March 2012, the group went on a co-headlining US tour with We Are the in Crowd. They were supported by Plug in Stereo, Simple as Surgery and The Audition.

== Reception ==
The album peaked No. 63 on Billboard 200 and is the band's most successful album to date.

== Track listing ==
All songs written and composed by David Strauchman and Jimmie Deeghan.

No.	Title	Writer(s)	Length
1.	"Tie Me Down"	David Strauchman; Jimmie Deeghan; Ryan Key	3:18
2.	"Whatever Happened to You"	Strauchman; Deeghan; Chris Cron; Ricky Sans	2:48
3.	"There Tonight"	Strauchman; Deeghan	3:29
4.	"Fall Apart"	Strauchman; Deeghan; Mark Weinberg	3:20
5.	"No One But You"	Strauchman; Deeghan; Tim Pagnotta	3:14
6.	"Only Place I Call Home"	Strauchman; Deeghan; Evan Taubenfeld	3:54
7.	"Someday, Somehow"	Strauchman; Deeghan; Mark Holman	3:45
8.	"Hit Me Where It Hurts the Most"	Strauchman; Deeghan; Jeremy Popoff; A. Jay Popoff; Ryan Gilmor	2:36
9.	"I Can't Not Love You"	Strauchman; Deeghan; Robert Ellis Orrall	3:44
10.	"Watch the World"	Strauchman; Deeghan; Mark Weinberg	4:13
Total length:			34:20

iTunes bonus tracks
No.	Title	Length
11.	"If I Knew"
12.	"I Can Never Tell You No"

== Personnel ==
- David Ryan Strauchman – lead vocals, piano
- Joshua Randall Withenshaw – lead guitar
- James Francis Deeghan – rhythm guitar, vocals
- Matthew Franklin Black – bass guitar, vocals
- Dennis Wilson – drums, percussion

Production

- Aaron Sprinkle – producer, mixing, mastering
