= Politically Incorrect (disambiguation) =

Politically Incorrect is a former late-night American political talk show hosted by Bill Maher.

Politically Incorrect may also refer to:

- Politically incorrect, someone or something which does not meet a standard of political correctness
- Politically Incorrect (blog), a German political blog
- Politiskt Inkorrekt, a former Swedish news site
- /pol/ or Politically Incorrect, a discussion board on 4chan and 8chan/8kun

== See also ==
- Politically Correct (disambiguation)
