= Almost (Bowling for Soup song) =

Single by Bowling for Soup

from the album A Hangover You Don't Deserve
- Released: January 4, 2005
- Recorded: 2004
- Studio: Red Ruby Productions; Atlanta, Georgia
- Genre: Pop-punk
- Length: 3.26
- Label: FFROE/Jive/Zomba
- Songwriters: Jaret Reddick, Butch Walker
- Producer: Butch Walker

Bowling for Soup singles chronology
"1985" (2004)	"Almost" (2005)	"Ohio (Come Back to Texas)" (2005)

"Almost" is a song by the American pop-punk band Bowling for Soup. It was released on January 4, 2005, as the second single of the group's 2004 album A Hangover You Don't Deserve.

It tells the story of a young adult who goes through many "almost" experiences during his life, from almost making out with the homecoming queen to almost getting addicted to drugs. He shows remorse for not "making his move" earlier, and he "almost" wishes she loved him too.

== Music video ==
A music video was released in the week of March 7, 2005, directed by Frank Borin and Ryan Smith (also known as "Smith N Borin"). The video shows the band in high school, attempting to get into sports in order to impress the girls there. This footage is intertwined with the band performing inside a high school gymnasium.

== Charts ==
Chart (2005)	Peak position
UK Singles (Official Charts)	100
UK Rock & Metal (Official Charts)	1
US Billboard Hot 100	46
US Adult Top 40 (Billboard)	17
US Mainstream Top 40 (Billboard)	21
US Pop 100 (Billboard)	23

== Certifications ==
Region	Certification	Certified units/sales
United States (RIAA)	Gold	500,000^{^}
^{‡} Sales+streaming figures based on certification alone.

== Release history ==
Release dates and formats for "Almost"
Region	Date	Format	Label(s)	Ref.
United States	January 4, 2005	Mainstream airplay	Jive	
