= ApologetiX =

American Christian parody band

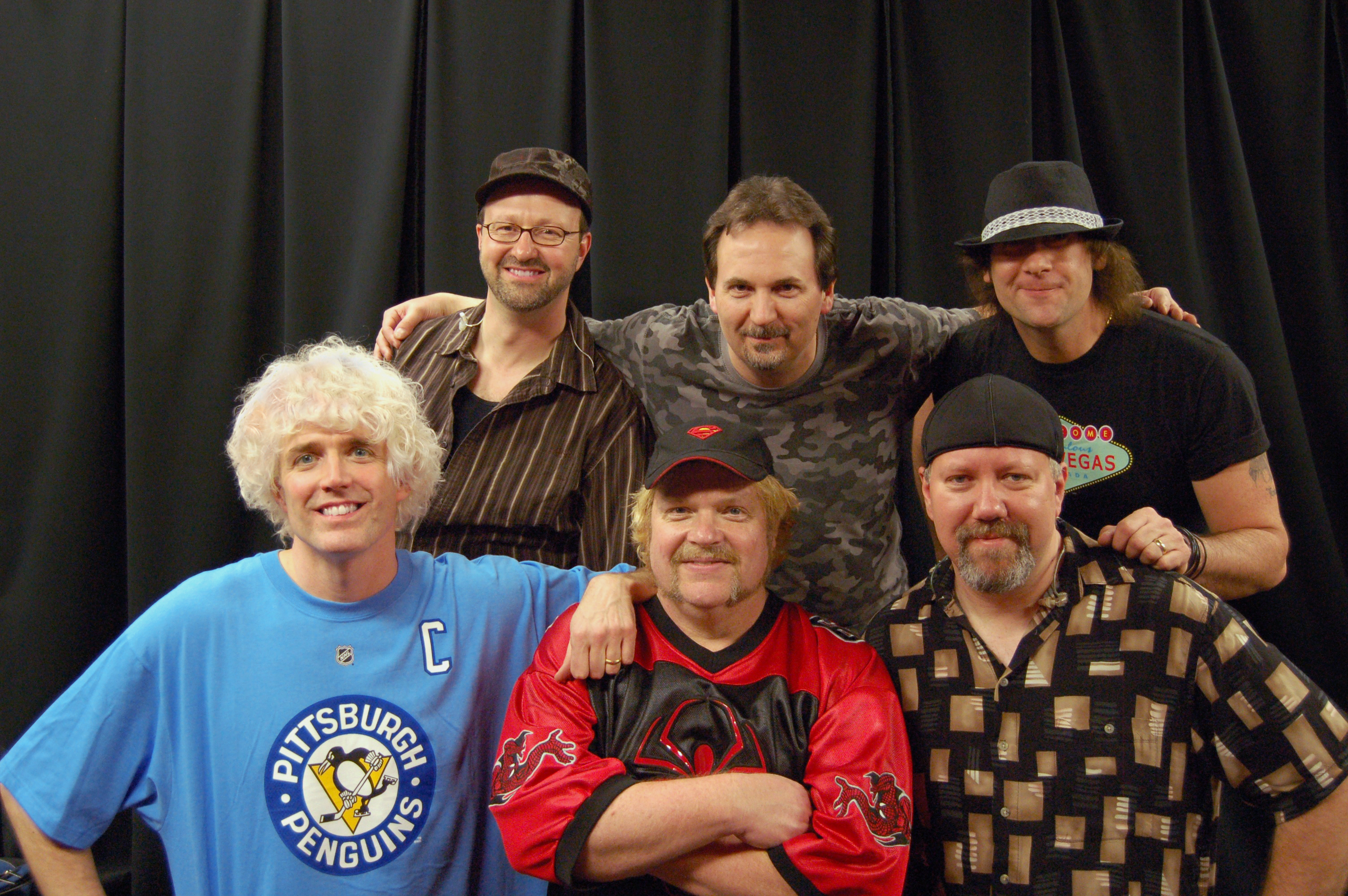
- 2009 lineup - Rear: Tom Milnes, Tom Tincha, Jimmy Tanner, Front: J. Jackson, Keith Haynie, Bill Hubauer

Background information
- Origin: Pittsburgh, Pennsylvania, U.S.
- Genres: Christian rock; CCM; comedy rock; parody
- Years active: 1990–present
- Label: Parodudes
- Members: J. Jackson; Keith Haynie; Jimmy Tanner; Bill Hubauer; Tom Milnes; Tom Tincha; Chris VonBartheld
- Past members: Karl Messner; Jerry Hayostek; Bob Flaherty; Fred Behanna; Jeff Pakula; Rick Servocky; Andy Sparks; Bill "Moose" Rieger; Todd Waites
- Website: apologetix.com

ApologetiX is an American Christian parody band from Pittsburgh, Pennsylvania. The band was founded in 1990, and since then, has played in almost all 50 states, and as of 2024 has released 75 studio albums, and built up a fan club that includes over 65,000 people. The band is currently composed of J. Jackson on vocals, Keith Haynie on bass guitar, Jimmy "Vegas" Tanner on drums, Bill Hubauer and Chris VonBartheld on keyboard, and Tom Milnes and Tom Tincha (a.k.a. "TNT"), both on lead guitar.

The name ApologetiX is a play on apologetics, the defense of a religious doctrine, in particular, Christian apologetics. The word is used in 1 Peter 3:15: "But in your hearts set apart Christ as Lord. Always be prepared to give an answer [defense or "apologia"] to everyone who asks you to give the reason for the hope that you have. But do this with gentleness and respect..." (NIV).

== History ==
ApologetiX has had six official drummers. Jeff Pakula (June 1990 – September 1993), Rick Servocky (November 1993 – April 1995), Bob Flaherty (May 1995 – September 1998), Fred Behanna (February 1999 – January 2001), Bill "Moose" Rieger (March 2001 – January 2005) and Jimmy "Vegas" Tanner (October 2005 – present).

ApologetiX has had multiple other drummers as well, including: their longtime fill-in drummer, Keith Harrold (who played on Isn't Wasn't Ain't and Keep the Change); David McKee (who played on Jesus Christ Morningstar as well as two concerts in 1998); and Jon "Bermuda" Schwartz (the drummer for "Weird Al" Yankovic), who played on seven tracks on Biblical Graffiti. Ron Zanski (two shows in 1993) and Allen Muckle (three shows in 2001) have also played with the band.

According to the band's website, Yankovic himself has told them that he thinks they do "...fabulous work".

Since 2014, the band has been following a quarterly release schedule, producing a new studio album about every three months by releasing double singles bi-weekly. From 2014 to 2017, they were able to produce four albums per year. In 2018, their studio computers started to have speed issues, which slowed down the production of their albums. So far they have released two albums, with a third album on its way.

== Musical style and lyrical themes ==
ApologetiX rewrites secular songs with Christian lyrics to create parodies with Christian messages, and, in the song "We're In A Parody Band," ApologetiX refers to itself as a cross between "Weird Al" Yankovic and Billy Graham.

The band's lyrical content is derived solely from Biblical passages and practices, frequently in a tongue-in-cheek manner. It is also noteworthy that lyrics are often embedded with Scripture references for further exploration of the song's content.

Some of their parodies include:

Song	Parody of	Original artist
"Lazy Brain"	"Crazy Train"	Ozzy Osbourne
"Don't Be Fooled"	"Don't Be Cruel"	Elvis Presley
"Hotel Can't Afford Ya"	"Hotel California"	Eagles
"Christmasnite"	"Kryptonite"	3 Doors Down
"Enter Samson"	"Enter Sandman"	Metallica
"The Real Sin Savior"	"The Real Slim Shady"	Eminem
"Smells Like Thirtysomething Spirit"	"Smells Like Teen Spirit"	Nirvana
"Bethlehemian Rhapsody"	"Bohemian Rhapsody"	Queen
"Story of a Squirrel"	"Absolutely (Story of a Girl)"	Nine Days
"More Than a Healing"	"More Than a Feeling"	Boston
"The Devil Went Down to Jordan"	"The Devil Went Down to Georgia"	Charlie Daniels Band
"We're Not Goin' to Canaan"	"We're Not Gonna Take It"	Twisted Sister
"Set Him Free"	"Let It Be"	The Beatles
"This Is From Paul"	"This Is a Call"	Foo Fighters
"One More Wall"	"Wonderwall"	Oasis
"Schoolhouse (for Prophets)"	"School's Out"	Alice Cooper
"One Night in Bethlehem"	"One Night in Bangkok"	Murray Head
"Drop Your Knife and Hurry Man"	"Rock You Like a Hurricane"	Scorpions

== Band members ==
Current

- J. Jackson - Vocals, lyricist (1990–present)
- Keith Haynie - Bass guitar (1995–present)
- Jimmy Tanner - Drums (2005–present)
- Tom Milnes - Lead guitarist (2008–present)
- Tom Tincha - Lead guitarist (2008–present)
- Rich Mannion - Keyboardist, BGV, Drum Programming (2018–present)

Former

- Chris VonBartheld - Keyboardist, Pianist, bgv's (2013–2018)
- Bill Hubauer - Keyboardist, producer (1998–2018)
- Karl Messner - Lead guitarist (1990–2007)
- Andy Sparks - Rhythm guitarist, Bass (1991–1995)
- Jerry Hayostek - Bass guitar (1992–1993)
- B.J. Collins - Keyboardist, producer (1997–1998)
- Todd Waites - Keyboardist (2011–2013)
- Jeff Pakula - Drums (1990–1993)
- Luke "Abaddon" Wienecke - Drums (1994–1996)
- Rick Servocky - Drums (1993–1995)
- Bob Flaherty - Drums (1995–1998)
- Fred Behanna - Drums (1999–2001)
- David McKee - Drums (2001)
- Bill Rieger - Drums (2001–2005)

Session

- Steve Kayner - Bass (1993)
- Keith Harrold - Drums (1993–2000)
- Jon Schwartz (drummer)|Jon "Bermuda" Schwartz - Drums (1999)
- Everlife - Vocals (2003)
- Janna Jackson - Vocals (2013-)
- Elaine Heitzer - Vocals (2014)
- Keely Singer - Vocals (2014)
- John Marcinizyn - Slide guitar (2016)

== Discography ==
=== Studio albums ===
Year	Title	Label
1993	Isn't Wasn't Ain't	Parodudes
1994	Radical History Tour	Parodudes
1997	Ticked	Parodudes
1998	Jesus Christ Morningstar	Parodudes
1999	Biblical Graffiti	Parodudes
2000	Spoofernatural	Parodudes
2001	Keep the Change	Parodudes
2002	Grace Period	Parodudes
2003	Adam Up	Parodudes
2005	Apol-acoustiX	Parodudes
2006	Wordplay	Parodudes
2008	Future Tense	Parodudes
2009	Recovery	Parodudes
2011	Wise Up and Rock	Parodudes
2012	Orchard Avenue	Parodudes
2013	Hot Potato Soup	Parodudes
2013	Handheld Messiah	Parodudes
2014	Singles Group	Parodudes
2014	Loaded 45s	Parodudes
2014	Apoplectic	Parodudes
2014	Unconditional Releases	Parodudes
2015	Easter Standard Time	Parodudes
2015	Music Is As Music Does	Parodudes
2015	Play Nice	Parodudes
2015	You Can't Say Euphrates Without The 80s	Parodudes
2016	Doves In Snakes' Clothing	Parodudes
2016	Minor League	Parodudes
2016	Quilt	Parodudes
2016	Only A Glorified Cover Band	Parodudes
2017	Very Vicarious	Parodudes
2017	Zebraic	Parodudes
2017	From Hair to Eternity	Parodudes
2017	Xit Ego Lopa	Parodudes
2018	I Know You Are But What Am I?	Parodudes
2018	Nichey	Parodudes
2018	That's Too Bad	Parodudes
2019	Double Take	Parodudes
2019	Sandwich Platter	Parodudes
2019	Conspiracy No. 56	Parodudes
2019	Prehysterical	Parodudes
2020	Alien Invasion	Parodudes
2020	Braggadocious	Parodudes
2020	Decent Alternative	Parodudes
2020	Overdue Books	Parodudes
2021	Get Rich Quick	Parodudes
2021	Never Before, But Then Again	Parodudes
2021	Apolog80s: Back From The Future	Parodudes
2022	Come See, Come Saw	Parodudes
2022	Rock's In Their Heads	Parodudes
2022	Kinda Stuffy	Parodudes
2022	Vision Gets Clearer As We Get Closer	Parodudes
2023	Eclectic	Parodudes
2023	Septuagint	Parodudes
2023	Just Reword	Parodudes
2023	Play It Again, Samson	Parodudes
2024	Unchained Medley	Parodudes
2024	Apologetix '74	Parodudes
2024	Zedekiah, Hezekiah, Jeroboam & Other Guys	Parodudes
2024	X-Tract	Parodudes
2025	Apologetix '77	Parodudes
2025	Quite Ironic	Parodudes
2025	Louder Than Plaid	Parodudes
2025	You're In The Eighties Now	Parodudes

=== EPs ===
Year	Title	Label
2012	Orchard Avenue	Parodudes
2013	Churchigo II	Parodudes
2013	Transformed Soul	Parodudes
2017	Churchigo III	Parodudes
2017	Churchigo IV	Parodudes

=== Live albums ===
Year	Title	Label
2005	Hits: The Road	Parodudes
2007	Chosen Ones	Parodudes
2009	The Boys Aren't Backin' Down	Parodudes
2010	Soundproof	Parodudes
2012	20:20 Vision	Parodudes

=== Christmas albums ===
Year	Title	Label
2002	Have Yourself A Parody Little Christmas	Parodudes
2008	The 12 Downloads of Christmas	Parodudes

=== Compilation albums ===
Year	Title	Label
1992	Rare, Not Well Done: ApologetiX Rarities, Vol. 1 & 2	Parodudes
2004	New & Used Hits: The Best of ApologetiX Vol. 1 & 2	Parodudes
2010	ApologetiX Classics -- The 60's [sic]	Parodudes
2010	ApologetiX Classics -- The 70's [sic]	Parodudes
2010	ApologetiX Classics -- The 70's [sic], Vol. 2	Parodudes
2010	ApologetiX Classics -- The 80's [sic]	Parodudes
2010	ApologetiX Classics -- The 90's [sic]	Parodudes
2010	ApologetiX Classics -- The 2000's [sic]	Parodudes
2010	ApologetiX Classics -- Oldies	Parodudes
2010	ApologetiX Classics -- Country	Parodudes
2010	ApologetiX Classics -- Lite	Parodudes
2010	ApologetiX Classics -- Heavy	Parodudes
2010	ApologetiX Classics -- Party	Parodudes
2013	ApologetiX Classics -- Christmas	Parodudes

== Filmography ==
Year	Title	Label
2003	Downer of a Sister Video	Parodudes
2005	Samson Comes Alive: An Evening With ApologetiX DVD	Parodudes
2012	20:20 Video DVD	Parodudes

== Awards ==
- 2005 Best CD Award: New & Used Hits: The Best of ApologetiX Vol. 1 & 2 (Christianity Today's Reader's Choice Awards)
- 2004 Favorite Indie Artist (CCM Magazine Reader's Choice Awards)
- 2002 Recorded Fringe Song of the Year: "The Real Sin Savior" (American Christian Music Awards/ChristianBEATS)
- 2004 American Christian Music Awards, Alternative Song of The Year: "Lifestyles of The Rich & Nameless"
- 2004 American Christian Music Awards, Outstanding Modern/College Rock Artist

== Chart positions of singles & albums ==
=== Albums ===
- Keep The Change

National Christian Retail Bestsellers Rock Chart, published by CCM (#15, November 2001)

- Adam Up

National Christian Modern/College Rock Album Chart, ChristianBEATS (#1, May/June 2004)

- New & Used Hits: The Best of ApologetiX Vol. 1 & 2

National Christian Newest Rock Album Chart, American Christian Music Journal (#1, December 2004) National Christian Modern/Alternative Album Chart, American Christian Music Journal (#1, December 2004)

=== Singles ===
Year	Title	Album	Parody of
2001	"The Real Sin Savior"	Keep The Change	"The Real Slim Shady", Eminem
2002	"Smooth Grandmama"	Grace Period	"Smooth Criminal", Michael Jackson
2002	"How You Rewind Me"	Grace Period	"How You Remind Me", Nickelback
2003	"Look Yourself"	Adam Up	"Lose Yourself", Eminem
2003	"Downer of a Sister"	Adam Up	"Chop Suey", System of a Down
2003	"Lifestyles of the Rich & Nameless"	Adam Up	"Lifestyles of the Rich & Famous", Good Charlotte
2005	"JC's Mom"	Hits: The Road	"Stacy's Mom", Fountains of Wayne
