= Here We Go Again (SR-71 album) =

Studio album by SR-71
- Released: May 21, 2004
- Recorded: 2003
- Genres: Pop-punk; alternative rock
- Length: 50:25
- Labels: Crown Japan; Matzoh-Ball
- Producer: Mitch Allan

SR-71 chronology
Tomorrow (2002)	Here We Go Again (2004)

Singles from Here We Go Again
- 1. "Axl Rose" Released: 2004

Professional ratings
Review scores
Source	Rating
Melodic	3/5 stars

Here We Go Again is the third and final studio album by American rock band SR-71, recorded during 2003 and released on May 21, 2004. It wasn't released outside Japan, although it was available on the band's website through a Japanese import. The album is most notable for containing the original version of the hit song "1985," which later became a major success when covered by the band Bowling for Soup. The album marked a return to the pop-punk sound of the band's debut album Now You See Inside, following the nu metal direction of their second album, Tomorrow.

On November 26, 2010, the album was finally released in the United States, more than six years after its initial release in Japan in May 2004, after being recorded during 2003. The North American version is available through iTunes, Amazon.com MP3, and other digital retailers and has all the tracks remastered, as well as 3 additional live bonus tracks, and a different track list order.

== Track listing ==
Japanese version track listing
No.	Title	Writer(s)	Length
1.	"Axl Rose (Where Did You Go?)"	Mitch Allan, John Allen	3:10
2.	"In Your Eyes" (Peter Gabriel cover)	Peter Gabriel	4:41
3.	"Gone"	Allan	2:58
4.	"1985"	Allan, Allen	3:41
5.	"Mosquito"	Allan	4:00
6.	"Here We Go Again"	Allan	3:03
7.	"All American"	Allan	4:09
8.	"Blue Light Special Life"	Allan	3:14
9.	"15 Minute Idol"	Allan	3:18
10.	"The One"	Allan	3:34
11.	"Everything"	Allan	3:52
12.	"Blood & Bourbon"	Allan	3:18
13.	"She Was Dead" (Demo) "Little Asshole" (Hidden track)	Allan, Kevin Kadish	7:21

- "Little Asshole" starts at 3:07 of "She Was Dead"

US version track listing
No.	Title	Writer(s)	Length
1.	"All American"	Mitch Allan	4:10
2.	"Axl Rose"	Allan, John Allen	3:11
3.	"In Your Eyes" (Peter Gabriel cover)	Peter Gabriel	4:42
4.	"Gone"	Allan	3:00
5.	"1985" (original version)	Allan, Allen	3:42
6.	"Mosquito" (original version)	Allan	4:01
7.	"Everything"	Allan	3:54
8.	"Here We Go Again"	Allan	3:05
9.	"Blue Light Special Life"	Allan	3:15
10.	"15 Minute Idol"	Allan	3:19
11.	"The One"	Allan	3:37
12.	"Blood and Bourbon"	Allan	3:18
13.	"I Want You to Want Me" (Cheap Trick cover, live – bonus track)	Rick Nielsen	3:40
14.	"In Your Eyes" (Peter Gabriel cover, live – bonus track)	Gabriel	4:51
15.	"Mosquito" (live – bonus track)	Allan	4:17

== Personnel ==
- Mitch Allan – lead vocals, rhythm guitar
- Pat DeMent – lead guitar, backing vocals
- Mike Ruocco – bass, backing vocals
- John Allen – drums, percussion, backing vocals, lead vocals on "15 Minute Idol"

== Release history ==
Country	Release date
Japan	May 21, 2004
United States	November 26, 2010
