= Shh, Just Go with It =

Studio album by Every Avenue
- Released: February 19, 2008
- Recorded: 2007–2008
- Genre: Pop punk, alternative rock, power pop, emo pop
- Length: 42:06
- Label: Fearless
- Producer: Zach Odom, Kenneth Mount

Every Avenue chronology
Ah! (2007)	Shh, Just Go with It (2008)	Picture Perfect (2009)

Singles from Shh, Just Go with It
- 1. "Where Were You?" Released: March 12, 2008; 2. "Think of You Later (Empty Room)" Released: 2008

Professional ratings
Review scores
Source	Rating
AbsolutePunk	(60%)
Melodic	2.5/5 stars

Shh, Just Go with It is the debut studio album by American pop punk band Every Avenue, released on February 19, 2008.

== Background and recording ==
On June 21, 2007, Every Avenue signed to Fearless Records, who released the band's EP Ah! two months later. In August 2007, the band went on an East Coast tour with Holiday Parade.

The album was recorded with bassist Cam Grenstiner, who left the band just before the album was released. Grenstiner is credited on the album but not included on the list of official band members.

== Release ==
In November and December 2007, the band toured the US alongside Sick City and the Mile After. While on the tour, the band's debut album Shh, Just Go with It was announced for release in early 2008. In addition, the album's track listing was revealed. On December 20, 2007, "Days of the Old" and "Where Were You?" were posted on the band's Myspace profile. In January and February 2008, the band went on the Manwhores and Open Sores Tour alongside All Time Low, Mayday Parade and Just Surrender. Shh, Just Go with It was released on February 19, 2008, through Fearless Records in the United States and on April 10, 2008, in Japan. The first single "Where Were You?" was available on March 11, 2008. The band supported the Audition on their Spring Break 08 tour in the US from mid-March until early May.

In April, the band appeared at the Bamboozle Left festival. In July, the band performed on the 2008 edition of Warped Tour. In October and November, the group went on The Compromising of Integrity, Morality & Principles in Exchange for Money tour, supporting All Time Low. In December, the band went on a brief holiday tour, titled Setting the Records Straight Tour alongside Set Your Goals, Four Year Strong and Energy. On February 1, 2009, a music video was released for "Chasing the Night". Between early February and early April, the band participated in the Take Action Tour in the US. The band appeared at The Bamboozle festival in early May.

== Reception ==
The album peaked No. 27 on the U.S. Billboard Heatseekers chart.

== Track listing ==
1. "Days of the Old" – 2:46
2. "This One's a Cheap Shot" – 2:58
3. "Where Were You?" – 2:41
4. "Think of You Later (Empty Room)" – 2:51
5. "A Story to Tell Your Friends" – 3:22
6. "Boys Will Be Boys" – 3:03
7. "Take a Step Back" – 3:08
8. "Trading Heartbeats" – 3:23
9. "Freak Out!" – 3:56
10. "Between You and I" – 4:38
11. "Chasing the Night" – 2:55

Deluxe edition bonus tracks

12. "Fame and (Mis) Fortune" – 3:12
13. "The Hell Back Home" – 3:16
14. "One More Song" – 3:00+
15. "Nothing" – 3:05†
16. "Picking Up the Pieces" – 3:09†
17. "Getting Out" – 4:12†

†From Ah!, also with "Think of You Later (Empty Room)" and "Where Were You?".

== Personnel ==
- David Ryan Strauchman - lead vocals, piano
- Joshua Randall Withenshaw - lead guitar
- James Francis Deeghan - rhythm guitar, vocals
- Cameron Joseph Grenstiner (uncredited) - bass guitar, vocals
- Michael Joseph Govaere - drums, percussion

Production

- Zach Odom, Kenneth Mount - producer, mixing, mastering

== Release history ==
Country	Date
United States	February 19, 2008
Japan	April 10, 2008
