= Absolutely (Story of a Girl) =

2000 single by Nine Days

Single by Nine Days

from the album The Madding Crowd
- Released: March 21, 2000
- Studio: Tree Sound (Atlanta, Georgia, US)
- Genre: Power pop; pop rock; alternative pop; pop-punk; jangle pop
- Length: 3:11
- Label: 550; Epic
- Songwriters: John Hampson; Brian Desveaux
- Producer: Nick DiDia

Nine Days singles chronology
"Absolutely (Story of a Girl)" (2000)	"If I Am" (2000)

Music video
- "Absolutely (Story of a Girl)" on YouTube

"Absolutely (Story of a Girl)" is a song by American rock band Nine Days for the group's fourth studio album, The Madding Crowd (2000). The song was released as the lead single from The Madding Crowd in March 2000 through 550 Music and Epic Records. The song is an upbeat power pop song written by vocalist and guitarist John Hampson for his wife, who was his girlfriend at the time it was composed. Brian Desveaux, the group's other guitarist, also receives songwriting credit. The song was recorded in Atlanta, Georgia, at Tree Sound Studios with producer Nick DiDia.

The song reached number six on the US Billboard Hot 100 chart, and it also peaked within the top 10 in Canada and New Zealand. The song's music video was directed by Liz Friedlander and received airplay on MTV and VH1. The band's follow-up single, "If I Am", became a minor Hot 100 hit, peaking at number 68. "Absolutely (Story of a Girl)" was later featured, both in audio and in dialogue, in the movie Everything Everywhere All at Once. Multiple alternate versions of the song were written by Hampson for the movie.

== Background ==
Nine Days was formed on Long Island, New York, in 1994 by vocalist/guitarists John Hampson and Brian Desveaux. For much of the decade, the band built a following by self-releasing their first three albums—Something to Listen To (1995), Monday Songs (1996), and Three (1998)—while performing frequently. The band struggled to get signed by a major label; talent scouts were reluctant as they did not hear a "hit" in their sound. "It can get very discouraging when you're giving everything you've got and you're not quite getting there. But we always felt we were inching our way along so we just kept at it," said Hampson in a 2000 interview. They put together an album to shop around to labels composed of their best songs, to little interest. Frustrated, they continued to write songs until Hampson penned "Absolutely". They recorded a three-song demo and were signed to 550 Music (then known as Sony 550 Music) in February 1999.

"Absolutely" ended up being the band's only hit single, marking their status as a one-hit wonder. "If it all ends next week, at least I'll be able to get my truck fixed up or get a new one. But if nothing, at least we accomplished this," Hampson said at the time of the song's success.

== Writing and composition ==
The song was written in August 1998 by the band's vocalist/guitarist, John Hampson, in an attempt to write in an edgier style. Though he "exaggerated things and used tons of figurative language to express something," Hampson confirmed in a 2003 interview with music magazine Impose that it was written for his wife, Teresa Savino, who was his girlfriend at the time it was composed. Its genesis stemmed from an argument the two had prior to a concert the band was playing on Long Island. After their fight, he "saw her talking to someone across the room, and she started laughing. I realized that as much as she aggravates me, I absolutely love her when she smiles." It was also inspired by Hampson's uncertainty about getting married: "I just wasn't ready. I was basically stalling her and making her cry. I was good at that."

Hampson picked up a guitar and worked out the song's chorus and chords in 15 minutes. He later completed the bulk of the song in one night, which was unusual for him. "I don't know where it came from, but everything was about a true feeling." The song first appeared as a demo on Bootleg '98, a promotional CD by radio station WLIR, who were early supporters of the band. After the band's record deal, it was re-recorded for its appearance on The Madding Crowd by producer Nick DiDia at Tree Sound Studios in Atlanta, Georgia.

== Critical reception ==
The song had positive reviews. William Ruhlmann of AllMusic deemed "Absolutely (Story of a Girl)" "catchy" and reminiscent of Barenaked Ladies. Steve Dougherty of People praised the song in 2000 for having "chunky hooks and [an] irresistible, sing-along, stop-and-start chorus". FMQB regarded the song as an "uptempo rocker with tight harmonies and an unforgettable hook" and speculated it would have appeal across multiple radio formats.

Praise continued in later years. In 2016, Bridget Fitzgerald of HuffPost called the song "effortlessly catchy" and "adorable". In 2015, Sputnikmusic's Lincoln Green called "Absolutely (Story of a Girl)" "pretty sappy and uninteresting, but at the same time, it’s catchy and there’s a little charm behind all of the cheese. It’s a harmless power pop anthem that at worst is clichéd and fun to jam out to at best." Green also said that the song encapsulated the music of the early 2000s.

However, Whitney Pastorek of Entertainment Weekly had a more negative review in 2006, calling the song derivative of "Meet Virginia", and grading the song with a C−.

== Commercial performance ==
"Absolutely (Story of a Girl)" was the band's biggest single, and it charted worldwide on multiple music charts. In the United States, it debuted at number 25 on Billboard's Modern Rock Tracks chart in the issue dated April 15, 2000; in the following weeks, the song rose to peak at number 10 on that chart on May 27, 2000. It reached number six on the magazine's all-genre Billboard Hot 100 chart on July 22, 2000. It was a number-one hit on the Mainstream Top 40 chart on August 12, which ranked the most popular songs being played on a panel of Top 40 radio stations. On August 26, it reached its peak on the Adult Top 40 Tracks chart at number two, which measured more adult-oriented alternative rock and mainstream pop. It was the 35th-best-performing single in the U.S. in 2000, according to Billboard. The single peaked the highest in Canada, reaching number three on the all-genre Top Singles chart; it also hit number 14 on the Rock/Alternative rankings.

Internationally, it was also the group's biggest hit. It fared best in New Zealand, where it reached number seven; it ranked as the 39th best-selling single of 2000 in that country. In neighboring Australia, the song reached number 31. It performed near the bottom of singles charts in other territories. In Scotland, it reached number 67; in the Netherlands, number 75. In the United Kingdom, the single only made an appearance for one week at number 83 on the UK Singles Chart dated October 10, 2000. The song was featured on the album Lizzie McGuire: Total Party! from the hit Disney Channel show Lizzie McGuire. In 2015, Billboard ranked it the tenth most popular song of the summer from 2000. By June 2004, the song had accumulated over 400,000 spins on radio in the U.S., and it received a BDS Certified Spin Award.

The song was covered by the band Four Year Strong for their cover album Explains It All (2009).

== Formats and track listing ==
U.S. 7-inch (2000)

1. "Absolutely (Story of a Girl)" (Remix – Clean) – 3:16
2. "If I Am" (Radio Edit) - 3:59

UK maxi single (2000)

1. "Absolutely (Story of a Girl)" – 3:16
2. "Absolutely (Story of a Girl)" (Acoustic) - 3:14
3. "Resolve" (Live) - 4:10

Europe CD single (2000)

1. "Absolutely (Story of a Girl)" (Remix) – 3:09
2. "Absolutely (Story of a Girl)" (Acoustic) - 3:14

Australia maxi single (2000)

1. "Absolutely (Story of a Girl)" – 3:16
2. "Resolve" (Live) - 4:10
3. "Bitter" (Live) - 5:36
4. "Absolutely (Story of a Girl)" (Acoustic) - 3:14

== Credits and personnel ==
Credits are adapted from the liner notes for The Madding Crowd.

Locations

- Recorded at Tree Sound Studios in Atlanta, Georgia
- Mixed at Image Recording in Los Angeles, California
- Mastering at A&M Mastering Studios in Hollywood, California

Personnel

- John Hampson – vocals, guitars
- Brian Desveaux – vocals, guitars
- Nick Dimichino – bass guitar
- Vincent Tattanelli – drums, percussion
- Jeremy Dean – Hammond organ, piano, keyboards
- Nick DiDia – production, recording
- Chris Lord-Alge – mixing
- Karl Egsieker – second engineer
- Shawn Grove – recording assistant
- Robert Hannon – recording assistant
- Mark Rains – recording assistant
- Matt Silva – second mixing engineer
- Stephen Marcusson – mastering engineer
- Andrew Garver – digital editing

== Music video ==
The music video was directed by Liz Friedlander in Los Angeles, California. It debuted on MTV and VH1 in the U.S. around April 17, 2000.

== Charts ==
=== Weekly charts ===
Weekly chart performance for "Absolutely (Story of a Girl)"
Chart (2000)	Peak position
Australia (ARIA)	31
Canada Top Singles (RPM)	3
Canada Adult Contemporary (RPM)	50
Canada Rock/Alternative (RPM)	14
Iceland (Íslenski Listinn Topp 40)	20
Netherlands (Dutch Top 40)	19
Netherlands (Single Top 100)	75
New Zealand (Recorded Music NZ)	7
Scottish Singles Sales (Official Charts)	67
UK Singles (Official Charts)	83
US Billboard Hot 100	6
US Adult Top 40 (Billboard)	2
US Mainstream Top 40 (Billboard)	1
US Modern Rock Tracks (Billboard)	10
US Triple-A (Billboard)	10

=== Year-end charts ===
Year-end chart performance for "Absolutely (Story of a Girl)"
Chart (2000)	Position
New Zealand (RIANZ)	39
US Billboard Hot 100	35
US Adult Top 40 (Billboard)	10
US Mainstream Top 40 (Billboard)	11
US Modern Rock Tracks (Billboard)	42
US Triple-A (Billboard)	33

Chart (2001)	Position
US Adult Top 40 (Billboard)	86

== Certifications ==
Certifications for "Absolutely (Story of a Girl)"
Region	Certification	Certified units/sales
New Zealand (RMNZ)	Gold	15,000^{‡}
United States (RIAA)	2× Platinum	2,000,000^{‡}
^{‡} Sales+streaming figures based on certification alone.

== Release history ==
Release dates and formats for "Absolutely (Story of a Girl)"
Region	Date	Format(s)	Label(s)	Ref(s).
United States	March 21, 2000	Alternative radio	550; Epic	
United States	April 3, 2000	Hot adult contemporary; modern adult contemporary radio	550; Epic	
United States	April 28, 2000	Contemporary hit radio	550; Epic	
United Kingdom	September 25, 2000	CD; cassette	Epic	
