= Right Now (SR-71 song) =

2000 single by SR-71

Single by SR-71

from the album Now You See Inside
- Released: September 9, 2000
- Genre: Pop-punk; skate punk
- Length: 2:47
- Label: RCA
- Songwriters: Mitch Allan; Butch Walker
- Producer: David Bendeth

SR-71 singles chronology
"Right Now" (2000)	"Politically Correct" (2000)

Music videos
- "Right Now" on YouTube
- "Right Now" (alternate version) on YouTube

"Right Now" is the debut single by American rock band SR-71 from their debut studio album, Now You See Inside. The song reached number two on the Billboard Modern Rock Tracks chart. It remained in the top 10 in on the chart for 11 consecutive weeks and became the biggest hit of the band's career, leading to many critics labeling the band as a one-hit wonder.

== Meaning ==
Mitch Allan explained what "Right Now" is about in a 2000 interview:

"It's about when you meet a girl and you like her and she's a great lay, and she wants more than just sex out of the relationship and you don't. You end up fighting and arguing all the time about the same thing, but also you don't want to break up with her."

== Appearances in other media ==
- The song is featured on the soundtracks to the 2000 film Loser, and the 2001 video games, Splashdown and MTV Sports: T.J. Lavin's Ultimate BMX.
- The song is featured in the game Major League Baseball 2K9.
- The song was used in the films She Gets What She Wants, Dude, Where's My Car (including its trailer), and the trailers for Harold & Kumar Go to White Castle and Old School.
- The song was used for a commercial of Fetch!.
- The song is the official theme song for the nationally syndicated radio program The Schnitt Show, hosted by Todd Schnitt. Variations of the song are played at the top of each hour, and as bumper music before and after commercial breaks.
- The band performed the song on the second episode of the short-lived 2000 NBC primetime soap opera Titans.

== Music videos ==
Two music videos for "Right Now" were shot. Version 1 features the band performing the song on a live setlist.

The second music video for "Right Now", directed by Marcos Siega, features SR-71 playing the song in front of fans, intercut with scenes of the band running from a mob of fangirls. The second video ends as it is revealed that it was all a dream. Version 2 of the video got heavier airplay on MTV than Version 1.

The first video has since officially become available online at the band's official YouTube channel.

== Charts ==
Chart (2000–2001)	Peak position
Canada (RPM Rock Chart)	23
Germany (GfK Entertainment)	73
U.S. Billboard (Bubbling Under Hot 100)	2
U.S. Billboard (Mainstream Rock Tracks)	38
U.S. Billboard (Pop Songs)	30
U.S. Billboard (Hot 100 Airplay)	81
US Alternative Airplay (Billboard)	2
