= So Happily Unsatisfied =

Studio album by Nine Days
- Released: September 17, 2002
- Genres: Alternative rock, power pop
- Length: 50:09
- Labels: Epic, 550
- Producer: Ron Aniello

Nine Days chronology
The Madding Crowd (2000)	So Happily Unsatisfied (2002)	Flying the Corporate Jet (2003)

So Happily Unsatisfied is an album that was recorded by the band Nine Days. It was intended to be the follow-up to their successful major-label debut, The Madding Crowd from 2000. The release date of the album was repeatedly delayed by Epic Records's 550 Music until the band was ultimately dropped. In the interim, the album had leaked onto the internet. The band has also put the whole album on their official website for the public to download. The producer is Ron Aniello.

The album was initially slated for release on September 17, 2002 before being shelved indefinitely.

In 2018 Sony Music released the album on Digital Download and Streaming services. the band was not notified until fans began to point it out to them via their social media platforms. they still do not own the rights to the music nor can they issue the album on CD or vinyl as many fans have wanted for over 20 years now.

== Track listing ==
All tracks are written by John Hampson and Brian Desveaux, except where noted.

No.	Title	Writer(s)	Length
1.	"Favorite Song"		4:33
2.	"Good Friend"		4:09
3.	"Emily"		3:37
4.	"Marvelous"		3:48
5.	"Still Here"		4:15
6.	"The Joneses"		3:50
7.	"Don't Look Back"	John Hampson, Waymon Boone	3:44
8.	"I Feel Fine"		3:45
9.	"Ocean"		5:51
10.	"Beautiful"		4:17
11.	"Everything"		4:27
12.	"Great Divide"		4:12

Bonus tracks
No.	Title	Length
13.	"Dirty Poet" (Available on Ninedaysmore.com)	3:29
14.	"Leelee" (Available on Ninedaysmore.com)	3:27

== Demo recordings ==
In 2013, during the relaunch of the band's website, the band released two sets of demos that were recorded during the recording sessions for the album. They made both sets available for purchase on their website.

=== SHU Demos 2001 ===
Singer John Hampson wrote on the band's website of these recordings:

In many ways, these demos "beat" the album versions. "Beautiful", "Marvelous" and "Everything" were the first three songs we had for SHU that we all really loved, and we recorded these versions with Nick Didia (producer/The Madding Crowd) in Atlanta while on tour in early 2001. These versions are much closer to what the whole album should have been like.[...]There are also a bunch of songs that never made the final cut, but probably should have.

==== Track list ====
1. Beautiful
2. Marvelous
3. Everything
4. Ocean
5. The Joneses
6. Ugly
7. Dirty Poet
8. Great Divide
9. Natalie Wood
10. Leelee Sobieski
11. Perfect
12. Clouds of Grey

=== SHU Demos 2 ===
Also released was a second set of demos. Hampson wrote:

This is the second half of all the demos we did for SHU. Most of the songs were recorded in a 2 or 3 day session we did at a studio on Long Island, NY, but "Sunspots", "American Girl" and "Angel Under The Stars" were recorded live at a rehearsal. There is also an acoustic version of "Good Friend" with alternate lyrics in the verses.

==== Track list ====
1. Good Friend (Acoustic/alternate lyrics demo)
2. American Girl (Live Rehearsal Demo)
3. Sunspots (Live Rehearsal Demo)
4. Angels Under Stars (Live Rehearsal Demo)
5. Still Here
6. Favorite Song
7. Emily
8. I Feel Fine
9. Good Friend
10. Marvelous
11. Beautiful

== Personnel ==
Adapted via Discogs.

Nine Days

- John Hampson – vocals, guitar
- Brian Desveaux – guitar, vocals, harmonica, mandolin
- Nick Dimichino – bass
- Jeremy Dean - keyboards
- Vincent Tattanelli - drums

Production

- Ron Aniello - Producer
- Chris Lord-Alge - Mixing
