= If I Am =

2000 single by Nine Days

Single by Nine Days

from the album The Madding Crowd
- Released: August 29, 2000
- Studio: Tree Sound (Atlanta, Georgia)
- Length: 4:18 (album version); 3:58 (radio edit)
- Label: 550; Epic
- Songwriter: John Hampson
- Producer: Nick DiDia

Nine Days singles chronology
| "Absolutely (Story of a Girl)" (2000) | "If I Am" (2000) | "Good Friend" (2002) |

Music video
- "If I Am" on YouTube

"If I Am" is a song by American alternative rock band Nine Days. The song was released as the second single from their fourth studio album, The Madding Crowd (2000), in August 2000. "If I Am" was a follow-up to their first single, "Absolutely (Story of a Girl)". The song was written by the band's vocalist, John Hampson.

== Song meaning ==
In September 2000, Nine Days guitarist explained the meaning of "If I Am" in an interview with MTV Radio:

"[The song] is about having patience...It's about two people in a relationship and one person wants all these things, like marriage, commitment, the whole nine yards. And the other person is kind of saying, 'Just have some patience. It will all come, but I can't do this right now. Just wait for me,' you know....Basically it's [about] two different people in two different places [in the relationship]...and the one person is saying, 'Just wait for me. I will be there and we will have all of this, but just have the patience."

== Music video ==
The single's music video, which was directed by German director Ulf Buddensieck, was filmed in September 2000. In the video, John Hampson is shown following a woman (presumably his girlfriend) through their shared apartment, into an elevator, through their building's lobby, across a busy street, and through a restaurant, before she gets onto a motorcycle, and they eventually end up back at the apartment. Interspersed are scenes of the band performing the song in a vacant store.

== Charts ==
| Chart (2000) | Peak position |
|---|---|
| US Billboard Hot 100 | 68 |
| US Adult Top 40 (Billboard) | 20 |
| US Mainstream Top 40 (Billboard) | 27 |

== Release history ==
| Region | Date | Format(s) | Label(s) | Ref(s). |
|---|---|---|---|---|
| United States | August 29, 2000 | Triple A; alternative radio | 550 Music | |
| United States | September 18, 2000 | Hot adult contemporary; modern adult contemporary radio | 550 Music | |
| United States | September 19, 2000 | Contemporary hit radio | 550 Music | |
