= Mitch Allan =

American record producer and songwriter

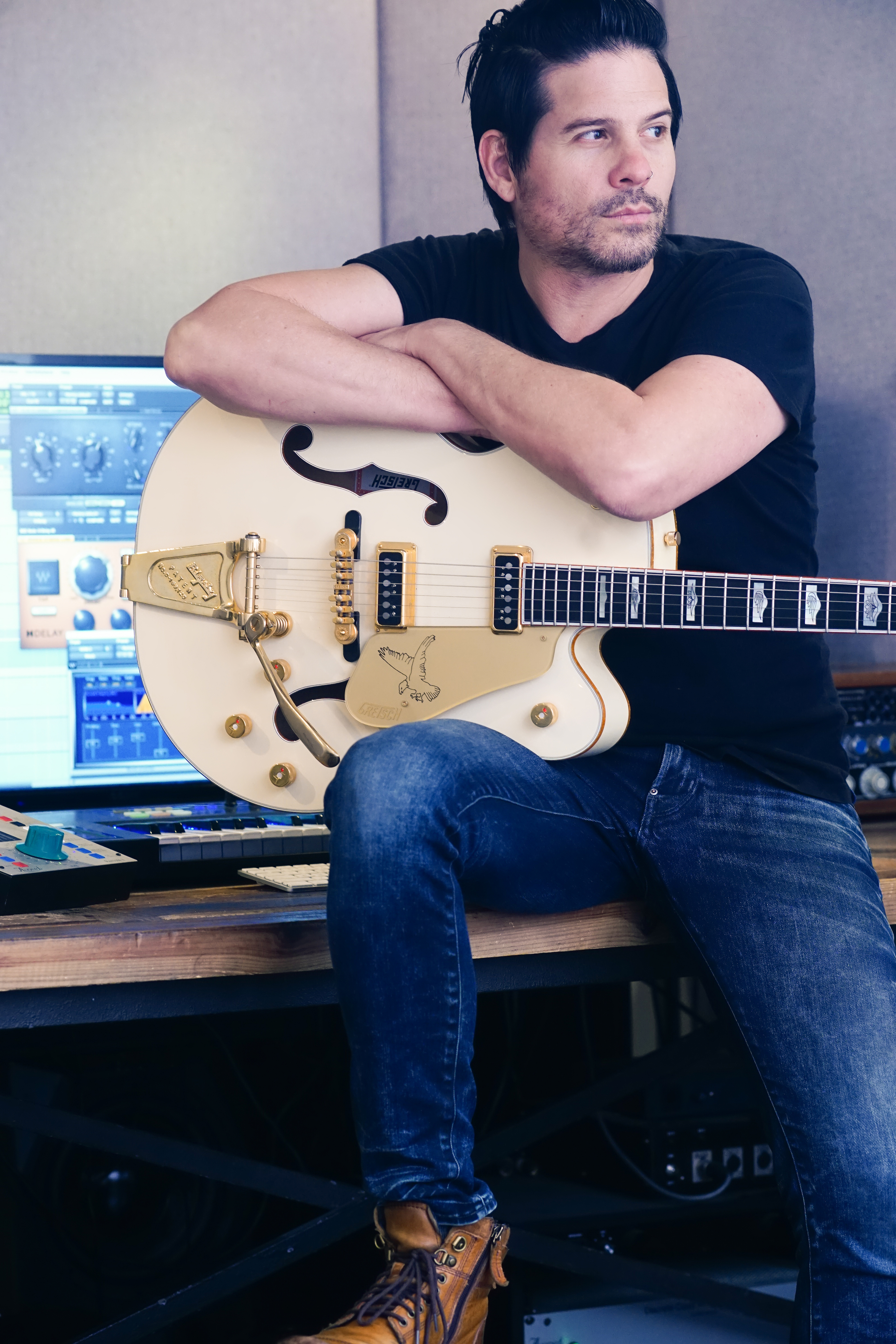
- Mitch Allan in the studio in 2020

Background information
- Born: Mitchell Allan Scherr; Baltimore, Maryland, U.S.
- Education: University of Maryland, College Park (BA)
- Genres: Alternative rock; punk rock; pop-punk; pop rock; power pop; nu metal
- Occupations: Record producer; singer-songwriter
- Instruments: Vocals; guitar; bass
- Years active: 1996–present
- Labels: Sony BMG; RCA
- Formerly of: SR-71; Satellite

Mitchell Allan Scherr is an American record producer, singer, and songwriter best known as the frontman of the rock band SR-71. He rose to fame with the hit single "Right Now" (2000). He wrote the song "1985" for SR-71, which later became a hit for Bowling for Soup.

Since the mid-2000s, he has become a go-to collaborator for major pop artists including Demi Lovato, Third Eye Blind, Miley Cyrus, Carlie Hanson, Jason Derulo, Pitbull, Lindsay Lohan, Fifth Harmony, Kelly Clarkson, Simple Plan, Faith Hill, Selena Gomez, Bowling for Soup, Jonas Brothers, and Joe Cocker. Allan received a Latin Grammy Awards nomination for Song of the Year for co-writing Belinda Peregrín's "Bella Traición".

Allan was the lead guitarist, producer, and backing vocalist of alternative project Satellite.

== Career ==
=== Production and songwriting ===
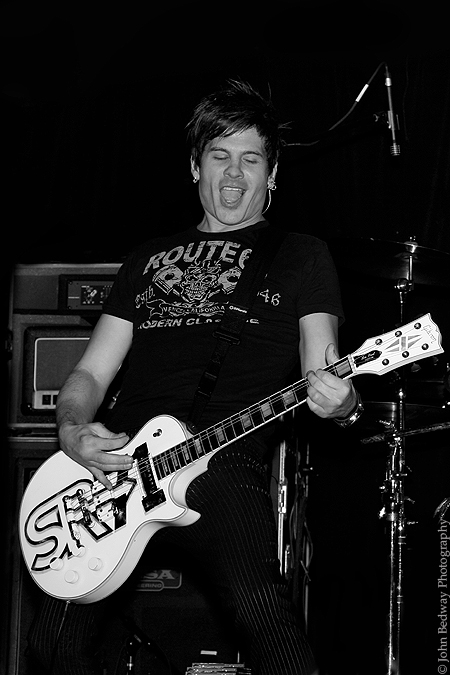
Allan performing with his band SR-71 in 2009

Allan began as a recording artist and songwriter after "1985", a song he wrote for his band SR-71, was recorded and released by pop-punk band Bowling for Soup in 2004. The track was certified Platinum and held the record for the most iTunes downloads in a single week at the time.

In 2007, Allan was nominated for a Latin Grammy Award when the song he co-penned with Kara DioGuardi and recorded by Belinda, "Bella Traición," received a Song of the Year nomination. That same year, another song written with DioGuardi, entitled "Lost," was recorded by Faith Hill and released as the first single from her Greatest Hits project. The song spent 21 weeks on the radio charts.

In 2015, Allan achieved his first worldwide #1 pop hit by co-writing Jason Derulo's "Want To Want Me". That same year, he co-wrote "Heartbeat Song" for Kelly Clarkson, which was subsequently nominated for a Grammy Award. When Allan partnered with writer-producer Jason Evigan under the moniker "The Suspex", they co-wrote and produced Demi Lovato's "Heart Attack," which reached #4 on the Mainstream Top 40 and was certified double platinum.

== Personal life ==
Allan lives in Los Angeles with his wife, Sana Yu, and their three children.

== Selected discography ==
=== With SR-71 ===
- Now You See Inside (2000)
- Tomorrow (2002)
- Here We Go Again (2004)

=== With Satellite ===
- Ring the Bells (July 2011)
- Calling Birds (February 19, 2013)

=== Songwriting/producing ===
| Year | Artist | Title | Album | Label | Credits |
|---|---|---|---|---|---|
| 2022 | Bebe Rexha | I'm Good (Blue) | Single | Warner Music Group | Vocal Producer |
| 2022 | Demi Lovato | Happy Ending | Holy Fvck | Island Records | Producer, songwriter |
| 2022 | Demi Lovato | City of Angels | Holy Fvck | Island Records | Producer, songwriter |
| 2022 | Demi Lovato | 4 Ever 4 Me | Holy Fvck | Island Records | Producer, songwriter |
| 2021 | Demi Lovato | Dancing with the Devil | Dancing with the Devil... the Art of Starting Over | Island Records | Producer, songwriter |
| 2021 | Demi Lovato | Mad World | Dancing with the Devil... the Art of Starting Over | Island Records | Producer, Mixer |
| 2021 | Demi Lovato | Met Him Last Night (with Ariana Grande) | Dancing with the Devil... the Art of Starting Over | Island Records | Vocal Producer |
| 2021 | Demi Lovato | What Other People Say (with Sam Fischer) | Dancing with the Devil... the Art of Starting Over | Island Records | Vocal Producer |
| 2021 | Demi Lovato | I.C.U. | Dancing with the Devil... the Art of Starting Over | Island Records | Vocal Producer, Mixer |
| 2021 | Demi Lovato | The Way You Don't Look at Me | Dancing with the Devil... the Art of Starting Over | Island Records | Vocal Producer |
| 2021 | Demi Lovato | Butterfly | Dancing with the Devil... the Art of Starting Over | Island Records | Vocal Producer |
| 2021 | Demi Lovato | Carefully | Dancing with the Devil... the Art of Starting Over | Island Records | Vocal Producer |
| 2021 | Demi Lovato | I'm Sorry | Dancing with the Devil... the Art of Starting Over | Island Records | Vocal Producer |
| 2021 | Demi Lovato | Change You | Dancing with the Devil... the Art of Starting Over | Island Records | Vocal Producer |
| 2021 | Demi Lovato | Sunset | Dancing with the Devil... the Art of Starting Over | Island Records | Vocal Producer |
| 2021 | Dixie D'Amelio | Roommates | Single | Hitco | Producer, songwriter |
| 2021 | Dixie D'Amelio | One Whole Day | Single | Hitco | Producer, mixer |
| 2020 | Demi Lovato | Still Have Me | Single | Island Records | Vocal Producer |
| 2020 | Marshmello and Demi Lovato | OK Not to Be OK | Single | Joytime Collective/Island Records | Vocal Producer |
| 2020 | Carlie Hanson | Good Enough | Single | Warner Records | Producer, Writer |
| 2020 | Carlie Hanson | Side Effects | Single | Warner Records | Producer, Writer |
| 2020 | JUTES | When You're Around | Single | Capitol Records | Producer, Writer |
| 2020 | Gavin Haley | The World Keeps Spinning On | Single | Red Bull Records | Producer, Writer, Mixer |
| 2019 | Gryffin | Body Back | Single | Interscope | Producer, Writer |
| 2019 | Avril Lavigne ft. Nicki Minaj | Dumb Blonde | Head Above Water | BMG | Producer, Writer |
| 2019 | Carlie Hanson | Cigarettes | Junk EP | Warner Records | Producer, Writer |
| 2019 | Carlie Hanson | Cigarettes | Single | Warner Records | Producer, Writer |
| 2019 | Shaylen | BTW | Single | Republic | Producer, Writer |
| 2019 | In Real Life | Somebody Like You | Single | Hollywood | Producer, Writer |
| 2019 | Third Eye Blind | Screamer | Screamer | MegaCollider Records | Vocal Producer (Full Record) |
| 2018 | Jonas Blue ft. Joe Jonas | I See Love | Hotel Transylvania 3 Soundtrack | Sony Pictures | Writer |
| 2018 | DJ Khaled ft. Demi Lovato | I Believe | A Wrinkle in Time Soundtrack | Epic | Vocal producer |
| 2018 | Demi Lovato | Sober | Single | Island Records | Vocal producer |
| 2018 | Demi Lovato | Tell Me You Love Me (Spanish Version) | Tell Me You Love Me (Remixes) | Island Records | Vocal producer |
| 2017 | Demi Lovato | "Tell Me You Love Me" | Tell Me You Love Me | Island Records | Vocal producer |
| 2017 | Demi Lovato | "You Don't Do It for Me Anymore" | Tell Me You Love Me | Island Records | Vocal producer |
| 2017 | Demi Lovato | "Lonely" | Tell Me You Love Me | Island Records | Vocal producer |
| 2017 | Demi Lovato | "Concentrate" | Tell Me You Love Me | Island Records | Vocal producer |
| 2017 | Demi Lovato | "Hitchhiker" | Tell Me You Love Me | Island Records | Vocal producer |
| 2017 | Demi Lovato | "No Promises" (Acoustic) | Tell Me You Love Me | Island Records | Vocal producer |
| 2017 | Demi Lovato | "Smoke & Mirrors" | Tell Me You Love Me | Island Records | Vocal producer |
| 2017 | Rachel Platten | "Perfect For You" | Waves | Columbia Records | Producer, writer |
| 2017 | Jack & Jack | "Beg" | Single | Island Records | Vocal producer |
| 2017 | Marina Kaye | "Miracle" | Explicit | Capitol France | Producer, writer |
| 2017 | Isac Elliot | "She" | Faith | Sony Finland | Producer, writer |
| 2017 | Bebe Rexha | "Atmosphere" | All Your Fault: Pt. 1 | Warner Bros. Records | Producer, writer |
| 2017 | Pitbull ft. Stephen Marley | "Options" | Climate Change | RCA | Writer |
| 2017 | Jorge Blanco | "Risky Business | Risky Business | Hollywood | Vocal producer |
| 2016 | POWERS | "Sunshine" | Single | Republic | Vocal producer |
| 2016 | The Score | "Going Home" | Unstoppable | Republic | Producer, writer |
| 2016 | Britt Nicole | "Concrete" | Britt Nicole | Capitol Records | Producer, writer |
| 2016 | Sofia Carson | "I'm Gonna Love You" | Single | Hollywood | Producer, writer |
| 2015 | Kelly Clarkson | "Heartbeat Song" | Piece by Piece | RCA/19 | Writer |
| 2015 | Jason Derulo | "Want to Want Me" | Everything Is 4 | Beluga Heights/Atlantic | Writer |
| 2015 | R5 | "Do It Again", "I Can't Say I'm In Love", "Nine Lives" | Sometime Last Night | Hollywood Records | Producer, writer |
| 2015 | Fall Out Boy ft. Demi Lovato | "Irresistible" | Single | Island Records | Vocal producer |
| 2015 | Demi Lovato | "Waitin for You", "Wildfire", "Old Ways" | Confident | Hollywood Records | Vocal producer |
| 2015 | Matt McAndrew | "Counting On Love" | Single | Republic Records | Vocal producer |
| 2015 | Sabrina Carpenter | "Eyes Wide Open" | Eyes Wide Open | Hollywood Records | Producer |
| 2015 | Bea Miller | "I Dare You", "Perfect Picture" | Not An Apology | Hollywood Records | Producer, writer, mixer |
| 2014 | GRL | "Don't Talk About Love" | GRL (EP) | Kemosabe/RCA | Producer, writer |
| 2014 | Jena Irene | "We Are One" | Single | Interscope | Producer, writer |
| 2014 | Caleb Johnson | "Change" | Testify | Interscope | Producer, writer |
| 2014 | Justice Crew | "Fly" | Live by the Words | Sony Music Australia | Producer, writer |
| 2014 | Prince Royce ft. Snoop Dogg | "Stuck On A Feeling" | Double Vision | RCA Records | Vocal producer |
| 2013 | Scott Stapp | ("Break Out") | Proof of Life | Wind Up | Writer |
| 2013 | Big Time Rush | "Like Nobody's Around" | 24/Seven | Nick/Columbia | Producer, writer |
| 2013 | Fifth Harmony | "Miss Movin' On" | Better Together | Epic/Syco | Producer, writer |
| 2013 | Selena Gomez | "Save the Day" | Stars Dance | Hollywood Records | Producer, writer |
| 2013 | Demi Lovato | "Heart Attack", "Two Pieces" | Demi | Hollywood Records | Producer, writer |
| 2013 | Satellite | "Say The Words", "Brooklyn", "Turning On My Own", "Saving Us Tonight", "Silhouette", "Come And Get Me", "Ring The Bells", "God Save The Dream", "You & Me", "What You Need", "Till I Return" | Calling Birds | Descendant Records/Sony Music | Producer, writer |
| 2013 | Zendaya | "Bottle You Up" | Zendaya | Hollywood Records | Producer, writer |
| 2013 | Kat Graham | "Power" | Single | A&M Octone Records | Producer, writer |
| 2011 | Ross Lynch | "A Billion Hits" | Austin & Ally Soundtrack | Walt Disney Records | Writer |
| 2010 | David Archuleta | "Good Place" | The Other Side of Down | Jive/19 | Producer, writer |
| 2010 | Bowling for Soup | "Dear Megan Fox" | Fishin' for Woos | Que-So Records/Brando Records | Producer, writer |
| 2010 | Demi Lovato | "Brand New Day" | Camp Rock 2: The Final Jam | Walt Disney | Producer, writer |
| 2010 | Katharine McPhee | "Had It All" | Unbroken | Verve Forecast Records | Writer |
| 2010 | Hannah Montana | "I'll Always Remember You" | Hannah Montana Forever | Walt Disney Records | Producer, writer |
| 2010 | School Gyrls | "Uncool" | School Gyrls | Island Records | Producer, writer |
| 2009 | Kris Allen/Adam Lambert | "No Boundaries" | Single | Sony Music | Writer |
| 2009 | Daughtry | "Learn My Lesson", "One Last Chance" | Leave This Town | RCA/19 | Writer |
| 2009 | Every Avenue | | Picture Perfect | Fearless | Producer |
| 2009 | Demi Lovato and Selena Gomez | "One and the Same" | Princess Protection Program | Walt Disney Records | Producer |
| 2009 | Hannah Montana | "He Could Be the One", "Don't Wanna Be Torn" | Hannah Montana 3 | Walt Disney Records | Producer, writer |
| 2009 | Jessie James | "Wanted" | Jessie James | Mercury, Island Def Jam | Producer, writer |
| 2008 | Anberlin | "Soft Skeletons" | New Surrender | Universal Republic | Writer |
| 2008 | Diego González | "Losing Me" | Indigo | EMI | Producer, writer |
| 2008 | Jonas Brothers | "Play My Music" | Camp Rock | Walt Disney | Producer, writer |
| 2008 | Lesley Roy | "Make It Back" | Unbeautiful | Jive | Producer, writer |
| 2007 | Alex Band | "Coming Home" | Alex Band EP | RCA | Writer |
| 2007 | Backstreet Boys | "Something That I Already Know" | Unbreakable | Jive Records | Producer, writer |
| 2007 | Hilary Duff | "Happy" | Dignity | Hollywood | Writer |
| 2007 | Faith Hill | "Lost" | The Hits | Warner Bros. Nashville | Writer |
| 2006 | Belinda | "Bella Traición", End of The Day, and "Alguien Más" | Utopía | EMI Televisa Music | Producer, writer |
| 2006 | Bowling for Soup | "Much More Beautiful Person," feat. Lesley Roy | The Great Burrito Extortion Case | Jive/Zomba | Writer |
| 2006 | Cowboy Mouth | "Joe Strummer" | Voodoo Shoppe | Verve Forecast | Producer, writer |
| 2006 | Daughtry | "All These Lives" | Daughtry | RCA/19 | Writer |
| 2006 | Lovehammers | "Casualty" | Marty Casey and Lovehammers | Epic | Producer, writer |
| 2006 | JParis | "Here We Go Again" | Call It What You Want | Emanon | Producer, writer |
| 2005 | Bo Bice | "My World" | The Real Thing | RCA/19 | Producer, writer |
| 2005 | Lindsay Lohan | "Fastlane" | A Little More Personal (Raw) | Casablanca | Writer |
| 2005 | Monty Are I | | The Red Shift | Island | Producer |
| 2004 | Bowling for Soup | "1985" | A Hangover You Don't Deserve | Jive/Zomba | Writer |
| 2004 | SR-71 | "Axl Rose (Where Did You Go?)", "In Your Eyes" (Peter Gabriel cover), "Gone", "1985", "Mosquito", "Here We Go Again", "All American", "Blue Light Special Life", "15 Minute Idol", "The One", "Everything", "Blood & Bourbon", "She Was Dead" (Demo), "Little Asshole" | Here We Go Again | Crown Japan | Producer, writer |
| 2002 | SR-71 | "They All Fall Down", "Tomorrow", "My World", "Hello Hello", "Truth", "Goodbye", "She Was Dead", "The Best Is Yet to Come", "Broken Handed", "Lucky", "In My Mind", "Non-Toxic (Remix)", "My World (Acoustic version)" | Tomorrow | RCA | Producer, writer |
| 2000 | SR-71 | "Politically Correct", "Go Away", "Non-Toxic", "Right Now," "Another Night Alone", "Alive" | Now You See Inside | RCA | Writer |
