= Something to Listen To (Nine Days album) =

Something To Listen To

Studio album by Nine Days
- Released: 1995
- Genres: Alternative, Power Pop
- Length: 71:36
- Label: Dirty Poet Records

Nine Days chronology
Something To Listen To (1995)	Monday Songs (1996)

Something to Listen To is the first album from the American rock band Nine Days. It was released in 1995 on the label Dirty Poet Records, before their major label debut The Madding Crowd. The band's name is "Nine Days" because it took nine days to make this album.

== Track listing ==
All songs written by John Hampson and Brian Desveaux

1. "Castles Burning" – 3:24
2. "Shipwreck Water" – 4:37
3. "Lost You...." – 4:28
4. "Her Own Two Feet" – 4:20
5. "7 Windsor Ct." – 3:39
6. "Outside Yourself" – 4:03
7. "Cap Le'moine" – 5:46
8. "9 Days Of Rain" – 3:50
9. "Things We Said" – 4:23
10. "All My Reasons" – 4:47
11. "Miss Alva Maria" – 8:42
12. "Muddy Water" – 4:41
13. "A Bit of Truth" – 5:07
14. "Making Amends" – 6:03

== Personnel ==
Adapted via Discogs.

Nine Days
- John Hampson – vocals, guitar
- Brian Desveaux – guitar, vocals, harmonica
- Nick Dimichino – bass
- Jeremy Dean - piano, keyboards, saxophone
- Keith Zebroski - drums (tracks: 1–7)
- Vincent Tattanelli - drums (tracks: 9–14)
