= Every Avenue =

American pop-punk band

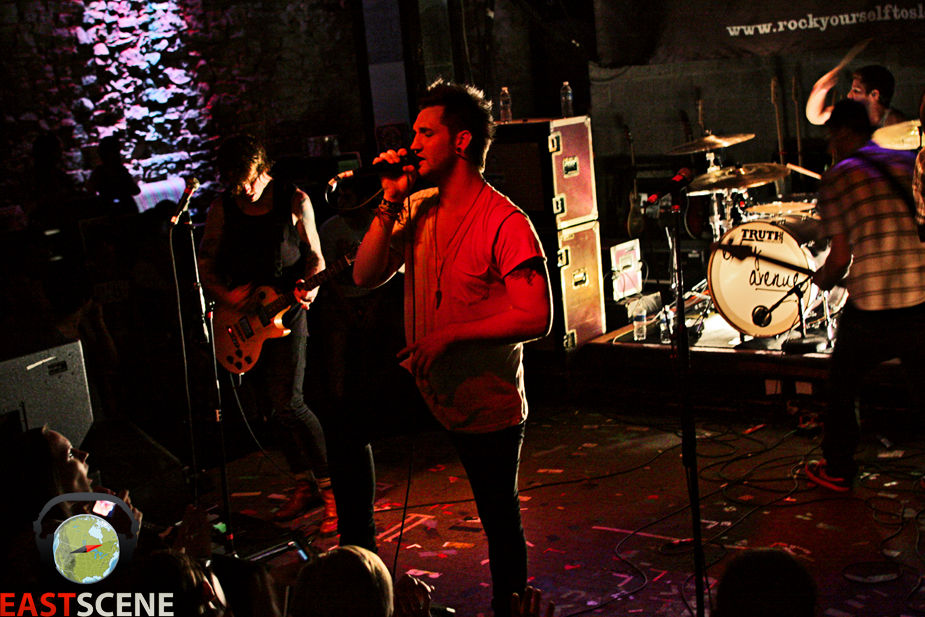
- Every Avenue playing in Atlanta, Georgia at The Masquerade in 2010

Background information
- Origin: Marysville, Michigan
- Genre: Pop-punk · power pop · alternative rock
- Years active: 2003–2012 (hiatus), 2018, 2023–present
- Label: Fearless
- Members: David Strauchman; Gavin Langley; Tommy Porter; Austin Kole; Joe Ragnone
- Past members: Joshua Withenshaw; Cameron Grestiner; Jason Letkiewicz; Michael Govaere; James Deeghan; Matthew Black; Dennis Wilson

Every Avenue is an American pop-punk band from Marysville, Michigan, formed in 2003. The group's most prevalent line-up consisted of David Ryan Strauchman (lead vocals, piano), Joshua Randall Withenshaw (lead guitar), James Francis Deeghan (rhythm guitar, backing vocals), Matthew Franklin Black (bass, backing vocals) and Michael Joseph Govaere (drums, percussion). The band is signed to Fearless Records and released their debut album, Shh, Just Go with it in 2008. It was followed up by their second album, Picture Perfect, in 2009, which reached no. 136 on the Billboard 200 chart. In 2011, the band's third and latest album, Bad Habits, was released, peaking at no. 63 on the Billboard 200 – the band's highest chart position. Every Avenue has toured with bands such as Boys Like Girls; Mayday Parade, The Maine, and All Time Low on the latter's The Compromising of Integrity, Morality and Principles in Exchange for Money Tour; and have also been a part of the Vans Warped Tour. As of 2023, Strauchman is the sole member of Every Avenue.

== History ==
=== Formation and early years (2003–2008) ===
Every Avenue formed in Marysville, Michigan in 2003.

They self-released two EPs in 2004 and 2006 before signing to Fearless Records in 2007 and releasing an EP in the summer of that year. Just before signing, guitarist Jason Letkiewicz left the band when he got a film making scholarship. Jimmie Deeghan replaced him and quickly became a principal songwriter.

=== Shh, Just Go with it (2008) ===
In February 2008, their first full-length album, Shh, Just Go with it, was released and hit No. 27 on the U.S. Billboard Heatseekers chart. They then began touring nationally with bands such as Hit the Lights, Farewell, Mayday Parade, All Time Low, and The Maine. They also appeared on the Vans Warped Tour in 2008.

"Where Were You?" not only received play on Yahoo! Radio and AOL Radio, but was also featured on MTV's Real World/Road Rules Challenge: The Gauntlet and received more than 150,000 downloads on Mark Hoppus' "Hi My Name is Mark" blog on iTunes.

"One More Song" was featured on MTV's The Real World: Hollywood (in the episode "Mexi-Loco"), as well as on MTV's The Island. Their video for their song "Think of You Later (Empty Room)" was released in November 2008.

=== Picture Perfect (2009–2010) ===
On April 11, 2009, it was announced that the band was in the studio recording their second album with producer Mitch Allan as well as Mike Green. A few days later on April 14, Govaere announced he would be leaving the band to move forward with his recording studio, Downbeat Studio.

The band's second album, Picture Perfect, was released November 3, 2009 on Fearless Records. The first single from the album, "Tell Me I'm a Wreck", was uploaded to Every Avenue's Myspace on October 9, 2009. It was also made available for download on the iTunes Store and for free listening on Spotify. Its music video was released online on August 12, 2009. The song "Picture Perfect" was featured in a montage during CBS's coverage of the 2010 NCAA Men's Basketball Championship game on April 6, 2010. The group also appeared on the Alternative Press tour in 2010.

Every Avenue was featured on Punk Goes Classic Rock (the 9th installment to the Punk Goes... series), doing their rendition of the Eddie Money song "Take Me Home Tonight" featuring Juliet Simms from Automatic Loveletter. The album was released on April 27, 2010.

=== UK Tours ===
Every Avenue made their first trip to the UK in January 2009, being the opening support for Boys Like Girls – alongside Metro Station. During the summer, the band toured with Philadelphia's Valencia. In January 2012, it was announced that they would be returning to the UK the co-headline with We Are the in Crowd on their UK tour in April, alongside The Summer Set. It was later announced a few weeks before tour was due to start that Every Avenue would not be on this tour due to an illness.

=== Bad Habits (2011) ===
On March 23, the band tweeted that they had officially entered their studio in order to record their third full-length album and on April 29 officially announced its completion. The band's third full-length album, Bad Habits, was released in summer 2011. On June 3, 2011, the band announced that Bad Habits would be released on August 2 through Fearless Records. The first single set to spawned from Bad Habits is 'Whatever Happened to You' which was released via Every Avenue's Facebook page on June 20, 2011.

The band appeared on the 2011 Warped Tour and toured as a supporting act for Yellowcard with labelmate Go Radio in the fall of 2011.

=== Last tour and hiatus ===
On October 24, 2012, Every Avenue announced that its upcoming tour will be their last. Frontman David Strauchman said, "As we have always said, this is see you later. We're not into goodbyes. We are not breaking up and are not on bad terms. We have all reached a new chapter in our lives and we are excited about exploring new possibilities."

=== Reunion (2018) ===
On October 1, 2018, the band announced a reunion, with two shows to take place at the end of the year in Detroit and Chicago.

=== A Light in the Dark Tour (2023) ===
In 2023, the band began a tour, with 20+ shows to take place around the United States.

== Members ==
Current

- Dave Strauchman – lead vocals, piano (2003–2012, 2018, 2023–present)

Touring Members

- Gavin Langley
- Tommy Porter
- Austin Kole
- Joe Ragnone

Former

- Josh Withenshaw – lead guitar (2003–2012, 2018)
- Jimmie Deeghan – rhythm guitar, backing vocals (2007–2012, 2018)
- Matt Black – bass guitar, backing vocals (2008–2012, 2018)
- Dennis Wilson – drums, percussion (2009–2012, 2018)
- Jason Letkiewicz – rhythm guitar, backing vocals (2003–2007)
- Cameron Grenstiner – bass, backing vocals (2003–2008)
- Michael Govaere – drums, percussion (2003–2009)

Timeline

== Discography ==
=== Studio albums ===
List of studio albums, with selected chart positions
Title	Album details	Peak chart positions				
Title	Album details	US	US Alt.	US Heat	US Indie	US Rock
Shh, Just Go with It	Released: February 19, 2008; Label: Fearless; Formats: CD, DL	—	—	27	—	—
Picture Perfect	Released: November 3, 2009; Label: Fearless; Formats: CD, DL	136	—	2	20	—
Bad Habits	Released: August 2, 2011; Label: Fearless; Formats: CD, DL	63	10	—	8	14
"—" denotes a recording that did not chart or was not released in that territory.

=== Extended plays ===
List of extended plays
Title	Details
Every Avenue	Released: 2004; Label: Self-released; Formats: CD
This is Why We Don't Have Nice Things	Released: March 14, 2006; Label: Self-released; Format: CD
Ah	Released: August 14, 2007; Label: Fearless; Format: CD, DL, streaming

=== Compilations ===
List of compilation albums
Title	Details
Every Avenue	Released: October 17, 2007; Label: Kick Rock Invasion; Formats: CD

=== Singles ===
List of singles, with selected chart positions
Title	Year	Peak chart positions	Album
Title	Year	US Pop Ind.	Album
"Where Were You"	2008	—	Shh, Just Go With It
"Think of You Later (Empty Room)"	2008	—	Shh, Just Go With It
"Tell Me I'm a Wreck"	2009	27	Picture Perfect
"For Always, Forever"	2009	—	Picture Perfect
"Picture Perfect"	2009	—	Picture Perfect
"Saying Goodbye"	2009	—	Picture Perfect
"Fall Apart"	2011	—	Bad Habits
"No One But You"	2011	—	Bad Habits
"Tie Me Down"	2011	—	Bad Habits
"Someday, Somehow"	2011	—	Bad Habits
"Watch the World"	2012	—	Bad Habits
"—" denotes a recording that did not chart.
