= Politically Correct (song) =

2001 single by SR-71

Single by SR-71

from the album Now You See Inside
- Released: 2001
- Recorded: 2000
- Genre: Pop-punk
- Length: 3:19
- Label: RCA
- Songwriter: Mitch Allan
- Producer: Gil Norton

SR-71 singles chronology
"Right Now" (2000)	"Politically Correct" (2001)	"Another Night Alone" (2001)

"Politically Correct" is the second single by American rock group SR-71 from their debut studio album, Now You See Inside. The song reached number 22 on the Billboard Modern Rock Tracks chart. The song was less successful than their breakthrough hit single "Right Now".

== Background and lyrics ==
The song is about social behavior and presidential politics, according to frontman Mitch Allan. The song was inspired by the 1974 western comedy film Blazing Saddles, which Allan saw while studying film at University of Maryland. He said the song was written after he had gotten into a political argument with his girlfriend, who was reportedly offended by the film's language and racial themes. Allan wrote the chorus "on the spot" using her guitar after she had gone to sleep. He recalled the incident to ABC News:

"She's laughing and laughing and laughing, but she's intimidated because of the language and how it was so over the top about racial issues. [...] I come from the Mel Brooks era, where you could say exactly how you felt and people understood. If someone asked your opinion, you could tell them and didn't have to butter them up — not like today, where you have to measure everything before you say it."

== Music video ==
The music video contains clips from the 2000 US presidential election.

== Chart positions ==
Chart (2001)	Peak position
U.S. Alternative Songs	22
