= Slow Motion Life (Part One) =

EP by Nine Days
- Released: 2007
- Genre: Alternative
- Length: 21:57
- Label: Dirty Poet Records
- Producer: Paul Umbach

Nine Days chronology
Flying the Corporate Jet (2003)	Slow Motion Life (Part One) (2007)	Slow Motion Life (Part Two) (2013)

Slow Motion Life (Part One) is an EP album recorded by American rock band Nine Days. It contains six new tracks. It was released in 2007 on the label Dirty Poet Records.

The band's pianist, Jeremy Dean, explains why Slow Motion Life was made into two separate projects in an interview with AlternativeAddiction.com. "“The name of the EP is Slow Motion Life (Part One), that means that there is going to be a part two, what we basically did is recorded a full album in two parts. The reason we did this is because it allowed us to A) to get some new music out to the people, and B) it allows us to get some money back to record the second half even better than the first half.” He also said, "We actually love the idea because usually when people hear a record they usually listen to the first 6 or 7 songs and that’s all they have time to listen to."

Slow Motion Life (Part Two) was eventually released by the band but only as MP3s sold directly through their website for a limited window. The band revealed that only demos had been recorded: "All That I'll Be Wrong", "Bri Song Version 1", "Symphony (No Vocals)", "Slow Motion Life (Edit)", "Easy (1 Piano Overdub)", "Absolutely Everything", and "The Heart You Squeeze".

== Reception ==
Alternative Addiction gave the album 4 1/2 stars out of 5. The reviewer writes, "the harmonies between John Hampson and Brian Desveux are some of the best around; and the chemistry that made Hampson, Desveux, and the rest of Nine Days a great band is still their bread and butter." He also writes, "the rest of the band is great too. Vincent Tatanelli stays in the pocket and is the perfect drummer for the type of band Nine Days is. Jeremy Dean’s keys add another dimension to the songs, and Nick Dimichino fills the other part of the rhythm section with some great bass work."

== Track listing ==
All songs written by John Hampson and Brian Desveaux

1. A Girl in California - 3:28
2. Suddenly (A Brown Eyed Girl) - 3:24
3. Worth Fighting For - 3:58
4. Just As Through With You - 3:53
5. New Shoes - 3:10
6. Brand New Me - 4:04

== Personnel ==
Nine Days
- John Hampson – vocals, guitar
- Brian Desveaux – guitar, vocals,
- Nick Dimichino – bass
- Jeremy Dean - piano, keyboards, organ, photography, cover art
- Vincent Tattanelli - drums

Production

- Paul Umbach - producer
- Brian Malouf - additional production (track 6)
- Dave McNai - mastering
