= Tomorrow (SR-71 album) =

Studio album by SR-71
- Released: October 22, 2002
- Recorded: 2001–2002
- Studios: The Mix Room, Burbank, California
- Genres: Nu metal; alternative rock; hard rock; post-grunge; punk rock
- Length: 46:14
- Label: RCA
- Producers: Neal Avron; Butch Walker; David Bendeth; Mitch Allan

SR-71 chronology
Now You See Inside (2000)	Tomorrow (2002)	Here We Go Again (2004)

Singles from Tomorrow
- 1. "Tomorrow" Released: August 2002; 2. "My World" Released: 2003; 3. "Goodbye" Released: 2003

Professional ratings
Review scores
Source	Rating
AllMusic	2/5 stars
Melodic	4/5 stars
Melodicrock.com	8.3/10
Music-critic.com	2/5

Tomorrow is the second album by American rock band SR-71, featuring the top 30 hit "Tomorrow". Released on October 22, 2002, through RCA Records, the album marked a stylistic shift for the band. While their debut album, Now You See Inside, was rooted in pop-punk, Tomorrow leaned into a darker sound often categorized as nu metal or alternative rock. It was the first SR-71 album with John Allen on drums, since Dan Garvin left after Now You See Inside.

"My World" would later be re-recorded by Bo Bice for his debut album The Real Thing, in which frontman Mitch Allan played guitar and bass. The song was re-recorded and re-made once again in 2007 and released as a single in January 2008 by Allan, initially as promotion for his canceled solo album Clawing My Way to the Middle. His solo version of the song was softer and more relaxed and was renamed "Makes Me High".

This is the last album featuring guitarist Mark Beauchemin, who left the band for personal reasons; and bassist Jeff Reid, for medical reasons. He was diagnosed with lung cancer, and died on June 11, 2004.

== Reception ==
Tomorrow has been described by AllMusic as "a vain attempt at cashing in on the booming success that such acts as Linkin Park and Papa Roach", while also noting that lead singer Mitch Allan sound similar to Linkin Park singer Chester Bennington.

== Track listing ==
No.	Title	Writer(s)	Length
1.	"They All Fall Down"	Mitch Allan	3:24
2.	"Tomorrow"	Allan	3:48
3.	"My World"	Mitch Allan, John Allen	3:35
4.	"Hello Hello"	Allan	4:02
5.	"Truth"	Allan, Allen, Mark Beauchemin	3:48
6.	"Goodbye"	Allan, Butch Walker	3:40
7.	"She Was Dead"	Allan, Kevin Kadish	2:31
8.	"The Best Is Yet to Come"	Allan	4:33
9.	"Broken Handed"	Allen	3:48
10.	"Lucky"	Allan, Walker, Beauchemin	3:17
11.	"In My Mind"	Allan	5:24
12.	"Non-Toxic" (Remix)	Allan	4:17

Japanese Bonus tracks
No.	Title	Writer(s)	Length
13.	"My World" (Acoustic version)	Allan, Allen	3:35

== Chart positions ==
Chart (2002)	Peak position
US Billboard 200	138

== Personnel ==
SR-71

- Mitch Allan – vocals, rhythm guitar, producer, engineer
- Jeff Reid – bass, backing vocals
- John Allen – drums, backing vocals
- Mark Beauchemin – lead guitar, backing vocals

Production

- Neal Avron – producer, engineer, mixing
- Butch Walker – producer, engineer
- David Bendeth – producer
- Ted Jensen – mastering
