= The Madding Crowd =

Studio album by Nine Days
- Released: May 16, 2000
- Recorded: Tree Sound (Atlanta, Georgia)
- Genre: Alternative rock; roots rock
- Length: 53:45
- Label: 550; Epic
- Producer: Nick DiDia

Nine Days chronology
Three (1998)	The Madding Crowd (2000)	So Happily Unsatisfied (2002)

Singles from The Madding Crowd
- 1. "Absolutely (Story of a Girl)" Released: March 21, 2000; 2. "If I Am" Released: August 29, 2000

The Madding Crowd is the debut major-label album by the American rock band Nine Days, released on May 16, 2000, by Epic Records. It spawned the major hit "Absolutely (Story of a Girl)" and another single, "If I Am". It peaked at number 67 on the US Billboard 200.

== Reception ==
=== Critical reception ===
Professional ratings
Review scores
Source	Rating
AllMusic	4.5/5 stars
MTV	Positive
People	Positive

AllMusic rated the album 4.5 out of five stars, with William Ruhlmann calling it "an album's worth of songs about personal relationships that are often rocky, but always involved and involving." For MTV, Alexandra Flood praised the album as "clean, frill-less, fruitful rock". People named The Madding Crowd "Album of the Week" for August 28, 2000, with Steve Dougherty praising Hampson and Desveaux as "highly talented" and the songs for containing "a literate muse".

=== Commercial performance ===
"The Madding Crowd" debuted at number 87 on the US Billboard 200, on June 3, 2000. It peaked at no. 67 on July 22, 2000. The album was certified Gold in the United States with 500,000 album copies sold.

== Track listing ==
The Madding Crowd
No.	Title	Writer(s)	Length
1.	"So Far Away"	Hampson; Desveaux	3:56
2.	"Absolutely (Story of a Girl)"	Hampson	3:09
3.	"If I Am"	Hampson	4:18
4.	"End Up Alone"	Hampson; Desveaux	3:57
5.	"Sometimes"	Desveaux	5:14
6.	"Bob Dylan"	Desveaux; Bob Dylan	4:35
7.	"257 Weeks"	Hampson	4:04
8.	"Bitter"	Desveaux	6:21
9.	"Back to Me"	Desveaux	4:00
10.	"Crazy"	Hampson; Desveaux	4:14
11.	"Revolve"	Hampson	3:54
12.	"Wanna Be"	Desveaux	6:03
Total length:			53:45

== Personnel ==
- Brian Desveaux – vocals, guitar
- John Hampson – vocals, guitar
- Nick Dimichino – bass guitar
- Jeremy Dean – keyboards
- Vincent Tattanelli – drums

== Charts ==
Chart (2000)	Peak position
US Billboard 200	67

== Certifications ==
Region	Certification	Certified units/sales
United States (RIAA)	Gold	500,000
