= Wake-up call =

Telephone service allowing one to wake up at a specified time

A wake-up call (alarm call in the United Kingdom, morning call in east Asia) is a service provided by lodging establishments allowing guests to request a telephone call at a pre-specified time, thus causing the guest to wake up at that time. It is similar in concept to an alarm clock, but is instead conducted via a telephone.

The phrase has also been used to describe an alert someone may receive regarding the consequences of negative circumstances or dangerous behavior.

Wake-up calls are also used in aircraft crew rests during long-haul flights to wake up resting flight attendants or pilots from their controlled rest.

== See also ==
- Knocker-up
