= Now You See Inside =

Studio album by SR-71
- Released: June 20, 2000
- Genres: Pop-punk; pop rock; power pop; post-grunge
- Length: 42:23
- Label: RCA
- Producers: Gil Norton; David Bendeth; John Shanks

SR-71 chronology
Now You See Inside (2000)	Tomorrow (2002)

Singles from Now You See Inside
- 1. "Right Now" Released: September 9, 2000; 2. "Politically Correct" Released: 2001; 3. "Another Night Alone" Released: 2001

Professional ratings
Review scores
Source	Rating
AllMusic	3/5 stars
Melodic	3.5/5 stars
Ox-Fanzine	Favorable
PopMatters	Favorable

Now You See Inside is the debut studio album by American rock band SR-71. It was released on June 20, 2000, with "Right Now" being its lone radio hit single. The title comes from a line in the bridge of "What a Mess". In December 2000, SR-71 toured the U.S. East Coast with American Hi-Fi.

== Music ==
Now You See Inside has been described as pop-punk, pop rock, power pop and post-grunge with elements of indie rock.

== Reception ==
Now You See Me Inside divided music critics, with most of them citing a lack of musical variety after the first few tracks and criticizing the lyrical content. Some critics found the band's polished look and radio-friendly pop-punk sound as shallow, while others highlighted the album's catchiness. Whitney Z. Gomes of AllMusic gave the album a score of 3 out of 5 and said, "Rather than attempting to maintain the velocity of opening one-two combo "Politically Correct" and "Right Now", the quartet soars into several airwave-friendly dimensions: "Last Man on the Moon" deserves heavy rotation, "Fame" features downright wondrous keys with a clever Kinks reference, and closer "Paul McCartney" owes more musically to Venus and Mars than Sgt. Pepper. SR-71 also swipes from the Stones, but the Spin Doctors aside in "Non-Toxic" seems closer to home. Take the time to see inside SR-71's debut. Like any commercial band, SR-71 morphs into whatever is on the radio, so the sophomore effort chases nauseously neurotic nu-metal; luckily, the delectably disposable Now You See Inside delivers pure pop for now people, and they need it now.".

== Track listing ==
No.	Title	Writer(s)	Length
1.	"Politically Correct"	Mitch Allan	3:19
2.	"Right Now"	Allan; Butch Walker	2:47
3.	"What a Mess"	Allan; Mark Beauchemin; Jeff Reid	3:42
4.	"Last Man on the Moon" (listed on some copies as "Last Moon on Monday")	Allan; Kevin Kadish	3:47
5.	"Empty Spaces"	Allan; John Shanks	4:28
6.	"Another Night Alone"	Allan; Reid; Beauchemin	3:33
7.	"Alive"	Allan; Beauchemin	4:12
8.	"Fame (What She's Wanting)"	Allan; Shanks	2:46
9.	"Go Away"	Allan	4:20
10.	"Non-Toxic"	Allan	4:04
11.	"Paul McCartney"	Allan; Reid; Dan Garvin	5:25

Japanese bonus tracks
No.	Title	Writer(s)	Length
12.	"Right Now" (acoustic)	Allan; Walker	2:58
13.	"Last Excuse" (demo version)	Allan	4:18
14.	"Right Now" (Enhanced video)	Allan; Walker	3:10

== Charting positions ==
Year	Chart	Position
2000	Billboard 200	81
2000	Billboard Heatseekers Chart	2

Single

Year	Single	Chart	Position
2000	"Right Now"	Billboard Modern Rock Tracks	2
2000	"Right Now"	Billboard Hot 100	102
2000	"Right Now"	Billboard Mainstream Rock Tracks	38
2000	"Right Now"	Billboard Hot 100 Airplay	81
2000	"Politically Correct"	Billboard Modern Rock Tracks	22

== Personnel ==
=== SR-71 ===
- Mitch Allan – vocals, rhythm guitar
- Dan Garvin – drums, percussion, backing vocals
- Jeff Reid – bass, keyboards, backing vocals
- Mark Beauchemin – lead guitar, keyboards, backing vocals

=== Additional personnel ===
- John Shanks – producer, guitars
- Gil Norton – producer, keyboards
- David Bendeth - producer
- John Allen – backing vocals
- Kevin Kadish – backing vocals
- Mark Pythian – keyboards
- Patrick Warren – keyboards
- Rob Ladd – percussion
- Richard George – violin
- Chris Tombling – violin
- Audrey Riley – cello
- Richard Bissell – French horn
- Graham Dominy, Brandon Mason, Bradley Cook, Richard Ash - engineering
- Jack Joseph & Neal Avron - mixing
- Ted Jensen - mastering
