= Nine Days =

American rock band

- Origin: Long Island, New York, U.S.
- Genres: Alternative rock, pop rock
- Years active: 1994–present
- Members: John Hampson; Brian Desveaux; Jeremy Dean; Nick Dimichino; John Miceli
- Website: ninedaysband.com
- Logo

Nine Days (stylized as ninedays) is an American rock band from Long Island, New York. It was formed in the hamlet of St. James, Suffolk County, New York in 1994 by John Hampson and Brian Desveaux, and released three independent albums in the 1990s before their mainstream debut album, The Madding Crowd, released in 2000. The band scored a hit in the United States from the album The Madding Crowd, with the single "Absolutely (Story of a Girl)".

== History ==
Prior to creating the group, John Hampson and Brian Desveaux played in a heavy metal band, and were also members of a cover band with drummer Vincent Tattanelli called Wonderama. In 1993, the duo took time off from those bands and began writing more poppy songs, with a focus on strong songwriting: "If the song didn't work on acoustic guitar, then it wasn't a good song," said Desveaux. The band's influences were Bob Dylan, Bruce Springsteen and Neil Young. They joined with bassist Nick Dimichino and recorded eight songs with a studio drummer. Tattanelli joined the new project and the band gained Jeremy Dean as keyboardist. They recorded their debut album, Something to Listen To (1995) in nine days, which they used as their band name. The group, from St. James, began playing weekly at the Village Pub, which was regularly frequented by Midshipman from the U.S. Merchant Marine Academy, in Port Jefferson, New York. They released their second album Monday Songs in 1996, and won several local radio contests.

After recording their third effort, 1998's Three, the band contacted producer Pat Thrall to create a four-song demo to circulate among record labels. The process was exhausting for the musicians, according to Desveaux, who estimated that they performed at showcases for each major record label and were "passed up twice by each." They more frequently began performing in New York City and continued to write, with Hampson adopting an edgier songwriting style. He wrote the song "Absolutely (Story of a Girl)", and the band recorded a three-song demo to once again shop around to labels. They were signed by 550 Music (then known as Sony 550 Music) in February 1999, and began working on their major-label debut album with producer Nick DiDia. The Madding Crowd was released in May 2000, and was the band's highest-selling album, shipping over 500,000 copies in the US. "Absolutely (Story of a Girl)" became a radio hit single, reaching number six on the Billboard Hot 100 chart in the US and within the top ten in Canada and New Zealand. "If I Am" was the album's second single, but performed poorer than its predecessor.

So Happily Unsatisfied, the band's follow-up and fifth album, saw a limited promotional release in November 2002 but did not see a full commercial release until 2006. The release date was repeatedly delayed by 550 Music until the band was ultimately dropped. In the interim, the album had leaked onto the internet. In 2003, the band recorded and self-released their sixth effort, Flying the Corporate Jet. Their next release was an extended play, Slow Motion Life (Part One) (2007). Slow Motion Life (Part Two), released in 2013 (the incomplete demos), was intended to comprise the two as a full album. That year, the band released their seventh main album, Something Out Of Nothing, following it up with Snapshots in 2016.

In February 2024, the band appeared in a television ad for Travel South Dakota (a division of the South Dakota Department of Tourism) performing a rewritten version of "Absolutely (Story of a Girl)" titled "Absolutely (Story of a State)." The ad debuted in South Dakota and neighboring states during the Super Bowl.

Outside of music, Hampson is currently an English teacher in Wantagh, New York. He wrote and recorded alternate versions of "Absolutely (Story of a Girl)" for the 2022 film Everything Everywhere All At Once.

== Members ==
- John Hampson – lead vocals, rhythm guitar
- Brian Desveaux – lead vocals, lead guitar
- Jeremy Dean – keyboards, backing vocals
- Nick Dimichino – bass guitar, backing vocals
- John Miceli – drums, percussion

== Discography ==
=== Studio albums ===
Title	Details	Peak chart positions	Certifications
Title	Details	US	Certifications
Something to Listen To	Release date: 1995; Label: Dirty Poet; Formats: CD, digital	—	
Monday Songs	Release date: 1996; Label: Dirty Poet; Formats: CD, digital	—	
Three	Release date: 1998; Label: Dirty Poet; Formats: CD, digital	—	
The Madding Crowd	Release date: May 16, 2000; Label: 550 Music; Formats: CD, digital	67	RIAA: Gold
So Happily Unsatisfied	Release date: November 12, 2002; Label: 550 Music; Formats: CD, digital	—	
Flying the Corporate Jet	Release date: 2003; Label: Dirty Poet; Formats: CD, digital	—	
Something Out Of Nothing	Release date: 2013; Label: Madding Music; Formats: CD, digital	—	
Snapshots	Release date: July 8, 2016; Label: Digitally Sound; Formats: CD, digital	—	
"—" denotes releases that did not chart

=== Extended plays ===
Title	Details
Slow Motion Life (Part One)	Release date: 2007; Label: Dirty Poet; Formats: CD, digital
Slow Motion Life (Part Two)	Release date: 2013; Formats: Digital

=== Singles ===
Title	Year	Peak chart positions										Certifications	Album
Title	Year	US	US Adult	US Alt	US Pop	AUS	CAN	NLD	NZ	SCO	UK	Certifications	Album
"Absolutely (Story of a Girl)"	2000	6	2	10	1	31	3	75	7	67	83	RIAA: 2× Platinum; RMNZ: Gold	The Madding Crowd
"If I Am"	2000	68	20	—	27	—	—	—	—	—	—		The Madding Crowd
"Good Friend"	2002	—	26	—	—	—	—	—	—	—	—		So Happily Unsatisfied
"Goodbye"	2003	—	—	—	—	—	—	—	—	—	—		Flying the Corporate Jet
"—" denotes releases that did not chart

=== Music videos ===
Title	Year	Director
"Absolutely (Story of a Girl)"	2000	Liz Friedlander
"If I Am"	2000	Ulf
