= Shine (Pat McGee Band album) =

Studio album by Pat McGee Band
- Released: April 11, 2000
- Genre: Rock
- Length: 1:06:29
- Label: Giant Records
- Producer: Jerry Harrison

Pat McGee Band chronology
General Admission (1998)	Shine (2000)	Drive-By Romance (2004)

Shine is the second studio album and major label debut for the Richmond, VA based Pat McGee Band, released on April 11, 2000.

On the heels of successful independent releases in Revel and General Admission, the band inked an album contract with Warner Bros. subsidiary Giant Records. Shine was composed mostly of new material written for the record, though two previously recorded songs were reworked: "Haven't Seen for a While," which originally appeared on McGee's 1996 solo From the Wood, and "Rebecca", from Wood and Revel.

Singles from the album were "Runaway" and "Rebecca".

Professional ratings
Review scores
Source	Rating
Allmusic	3/5 stars

== Track listing ==
1. "Runaway" - 3:57
2. "Rebecca" - 4:56
3. "Anybody" - 4:08
4. "Drivin'" - 4:13
5. "Haven't Seen for a While" - 5:32
6. "Hero" - 3:59
7. "Lost" - 4:24
8. "Fine" - 4:18
9. "What Ya Got" - 3:31
10. "Gibby" - 4:12
11. "Minute" - 4:09
12. "I Know" - 6:25
13. "Shine" - 4:44

There is a hidden track immediately following the conclusion of "Shine" that instrumentally reprises the twelfth track, "I Know".

== Personnel ==
The Pat McGee Band

  - Pat McGee - lead vocals, guitars
  - Al Walsh - acoustic guitar
  - Jonathan Wiliams - keyboards, backing vocals
  - Chardy McEwan - percussion
  - Chris Williams - drums
  - John Small - bass guitar
  - Brian Fechino - electric guitar on "Hero" and "What Ya Got"
- Michael Ghegan - saxophone
- Warren Haynes - slide guitar on "Anybody" and "Shine"
