= Vintage Stages Live =

Live album by Pat McGee Band

Live album by Pat McGee Band
- Released: February 20, 2007
- Recorded: WorkPlay Theater and Studios, Birmingham, Alabama
- Genre: Rock
- Length: 76:08
- Label: Kirtland Records
- Producer: David Castell, Michael Grady. Pat McGee Band

Pat McGee Band chronology
Save Me (2004-2005)	Vintage Stages Live (2007)	These Days (The Virginia Sessions) (2007)

Vintage Stages Live is the title of a live album and concert DVD from the Richmond, Virginia based Pat McGee Band. It is the sixth full-length CD released by the band; it is also their second live release (the first being General Admission) and their second effort under Kirtland Records. The concerts were filmed at the WorkPlay Theater and Studios in Birmingham, Alabama, and The Barns at the Wolf Trap National Park for the Performing Arts in Vienna, Virginia. The WorkPlay performance is also the last recorded performance with Chris Williams, who died in October 2006 during the DVD post-production.

Stages was released as a CD/DVD combination. It was first available for pre-order in November 2006 through the Aware Records online store, and achieved wide release in February 2007. Two online-only bonuses were available with the purchase of a hard copy of the album. The first offer was from the Aware store, where preorder customers were e-mailed a link to three exclusive acoustic song downloads, and the second was a similar offer to BestBuy.com customers that was available during the first week of the album's official release.

== CD content ==
The CD only contains the WorkPlay show. Due to the length of the performance, "Shine" had to be left off the CD, though it can be seen and heard on the DVD. Conversely, "Who Stole Her From Heaven," which appears on the CD, is nowhere in the DVD performance.

=== Track listing ===
1. Intro 1:34
2. "Runaway" 5:41
3. "Now" 4:00
4. "Must Have Been Love" 4:08
5. "Minute" 4:49
6. "Beautiful Ways" 3:57
7. "Haven't Seen For a While" 6:11
8. "Who Stole Her From Heaven" 4:30
9. "Annabel" 4:58
10. "Girl From Athens" 6:42
11. "Lost" 6:23
12. "Set Me Free" 4:01
13. "You and I" 4:14
14. "Passion" 7:30
15. "Rebecca" 7:30

== DVD content ==
The DVD consists of two performances: a full band show at the WorkPlay, and a stripped down short set at The Barns at Wolf Trap.

=== WorkPlay ===
During the final stages of editing this DVD, we suffered a crushing blow. We lost our brother, friend and bandmate Chris Williams. Chris was one of the founding members of Pat McGee Band; in fact, we were not a 'band' until we signed Chris on as our drummer in March 1996. Over the past decade we became closer than any family could dream of. Chris was as kind and caring a person as you could wish to meet. As Jonathan [Williams] put it so well... when CW looked at you, you could see in his eyes that he loved you.

We feel so fortunate to have loved and laughed so much with him. We will continue to do just that. Every day.

If you wish to make a memorial donation in honor of Chris Williams, please go to www.progeriaresearch.org.

==== Chapter listing ====
1. "Runaway"
2. "Now"
3. "Must Have Been Love"
4. "Minute"
5. "Beautiful Ways"
6. "Haven't Seen For a While"
7. "Annabel"
8. "Girl From Athens"
9. "Lost"
10. "Set Me Free"
11. "You and I"
12. "Passion"
13. "Shine"
14. "Rebecca"

=== Wolf Trap ===
Live Acoustic from The Barns

Live album by Pat McGee Band
- Released: May 8, 2007
- Recorded: The Barns at Wolf Trap, Vienna, Virginia
- Genre: Rock
- Length: 42:50
- Label: Kirtland Records
- Producer: Jeremy Schultz, Brian Fechino, Pat McGee Band

Recorded shortly after the WorkPlay performance, the session at The Barns at Wolf Trap served as a sort of ten-year reunion for the band. Almost everyone who had contributed to a McGee recording project showed up to play a little; noticeably absent from the set were Chris Williams and original PMB bassist John Small. The short set could either be played on the DVD as a whole, or interspersed with interviews with McGee that gave background stories to the writing of the songs and the band's formation.

On May 8, 2007, the set minus the "Haven't Seen" tease was released as a digital EP under the moniker Live Acoustic from The Barns. It was an iTunes exclusive but has since been removed.

==== DVD chapter listing ====
1. Interview: Intro
2. Interview: "Fine"
3. "Fine"
4. Interview: "On Your Way Out of Here"
5. "On Your Way Out of Here"
6. Interview: "Never Around"
7. "Never Around"
8. Interview: "Girl From Athens"
9. "Girl From Athens"
10. Interview: "Flooding Both of Us"
11. "Flooding Both of Us"
12. Interview: "I Know"
13. "I Know"
14. Interview: "Elegy for Amy"
15. "Elegy for Amy"
16. "Haven't Seen For a While" (used as outro)

==== Digital EP track listing ====
Songs appear on the EP in a different order from the DVD, with truncated names.

1. "Athens" 5:28
2. "Fine" 4:46
3. "Flooding" 8:27
4. "Never Around" 4:40
5. "On Your Way Out of Here" (currently mislabeled as "Rebecca") 8:21
6. "Elegy" 4:38
7. "I Know" 6:30

== Personnel ==
- Pat McGee: lead vocals, guitar
- Brian Fechino: lead guitar
- Jonathan Williams: keyboards, backup vocals
- Chardy McEwan: percussion
- Chris Williams: drums
- "Crix" Reardon: bass guitar, backup vocals
- Michael Ghegan: saxophone
- Todd Wright: keys. guitar, backup vocals
- Hugh McGee: backup vocals
- Chris Bashista: drums
