= Carry On (EP) =

EP by People on Vacation
- Released: November 24, 2011 (US); February 13, 2012 (UK, download); March 26, 2012 (UK, CD)
- Recorded: 2010–2011; The Daycare (Jaret Reddick's home studio); Highland Village, TX; The Tackle Box; Hollywood, CA; The Lair; Los Angeles, CA
- Genre: Indie rock; pop punk
- Length: 23:24
- Label: Brando
- Producer: Jaret Reddick, Ryan Hamilton, Linus of Hollywood

People on Vacation chronology
Carry On (2011)	The Summer and the Fall (2012)

Carry On (stylized as Carry_On) is the debut extended play released by People on Vacation, a supergroup composed of Ryan Hamilton from indie rock band Smile Smile and Jaret Reddick from pop punk band Bowling for Soup. The EP was released on November 24, 2011, in the United States both on CD and as a digital download. The EP was released in the United Kingdom for download on February 13, 2012, and was released on CD as a split with Bowling for Soup bassist Erik Chandler's solo project on March 26, 2012. The group released their full-length album, The Summer and the Fall, on November 22, 2012, featuring the same recordings of "Rainy Day," "It's Not Love," and "Where Do We Go" from The Carry on EP.

== Track listing ==
All tracks are written by Jaret Reddick and Ryan Hamilton.

No.	Title	Length
1.	"Better Off Dead"	3:20
2.	"It's Not Love"	2:37
3.	"Alone With You"	3:51
4.	"Rainy Day"	3:49
5.	"She Was the Only One"	3:24
6.	"Where Do We Go"	3:26

Digital Download Edition
No.	Title	Length
7.	"Cheer Up (It's Christmas)"	2:57

Pre-order bonus tracks
No.	Title	Length
1.	"Mistake (Away from Me)" (Demo)	2:39
2.	"Cheer Up (It's Christmas)"	2:57

=== B-sides ===
- "ADV Club" – 1:33
- "It Must Be Christmas" (Released on The Light Connected: A Holiday Music Collection, a Kirtland Records holiday compilation^{[B]}) – 4:59

== People on Vacation ==
- Jaret Reddick – vocals, guitar, producer
- Ryan Hamilton – vocals, guitar, keyboards, producer
- Additional musicians:
  - Linus of Hollywood – guitar, keyboards, producer
  - Tom Polce (of Letters to Cleo) – drums
  - Erik Chandler (of Bowling for Soup) – bass
- Recorded at The Daycare in Highland Village, Texas
- Additional recording at The Tackle Box in Hollywood and The Lair in Los Angeles, California
- Mixed by Tom Polce
- Mastered by Dave Collins
- Package Design by Brad Bond
- Photos by Will Bolton
- Photo of Ryan and Jaret by Melissa Reddick
- Management: Rainmaker Artists
