= High School Never Ends =

2006 single by Bowling for Soup

Single by Bowling for Soup

from the album The Great Burrito Extortion Case
- Released: September 19, 2006
- Recorded: May 15 – June 14, 2006; Ruby Red Productions; Atlanta, Georgia; Pulse Recording; Silverlake, California; Rosewater Studios; Tulsa, Oklahoma
- Genre: Pop-punk
- Length: 3:28
- Label: Jive; Zomba; A&G
- Songwriters: Jaret Reddick; Adam Schlesinger
- Producers: Russ-T. Cobb; Jaret Reddick; Adam Schlesinger

Bowling for Soup singles chronology
"Ohio (Come Back to Texas)" (2005)	"High School Never Ends" (2006)	"When We Die" (2007)

"High School Never Ends" is a song by American pop-punk band Bowling for Soup. The song was the first single from the group's sixth album, The Great Burrito Extortion Case, and was released on September 19, 2006. The song deals with the frustration of graduating from high school and seeing that modern popular culture is very similar to the obnoxiously superficial and materialistic culture in high school.

The tune had a prominent outside songwriter, Adam Schlesinger of Fountains of Wayne and Tinted Windows, working with the band. It was used in the promos for The Goldbergs spinoff, Schooled.

== Song references ==
The song contains many references to the pop culture of the time. Specific celebrities mentioned include Jessica Simpson (you'll never guess what Jessica did), Mary-Kate Olsen (specifically, her alleged eating disorder - How did Mary Kate lose all that weight?) Tom Cruise and Katie Holmes (Katie had a baby so I guess Tom's straight, also a reference to his litigation against journalists/paparazzi who questioned his sexuality), Reese Witherspoon (Reese Witherspoon, she's the prom queen), Bill Gates (Bill Gates, captain of the chess team), Jack Black (Jack Black, the clown) and Brad Pitt (Brad Pitt, the quarterback). The song satirizes many aspects of American society and its scrutiny of celebrity lives.

== Music video ==
The video focuses on the band members going to their twenty-year high school reunion at Borin High School (named after the video's director Frank Borin), while another version of them performs the song onstage. They arrive, instantly recognizing people from the past that bullied them. During a montage, the band gets revenge on their former bullies in situations similar to their high school past.

The first flashback shows drummer Gary Wiseman getting a wedgie by some bullies, who hang him on the flagpole by his underwear. Gary takes his revenge by grabbing the underwear of one of the bullies and pulling it over his head while he is still wearing it.

The next flashback involves bassist Erik Chandler getting a note reading "kick me" taped to his back by a jock. Erik gets him back by sticking the punch bowl sign (which simply reads "PUNCH") on his back; this starts a queue of people ready to punch the jock, including a nun, a pimp, a cowboy, and a knight in armor (possibly in homage to a similar scene in the movie Airplane!).

After a sequence of celebrities references, vocalist Jaret Reddick invites a guy onstage who had embarrassed him in high school by pulling down his pants in front of a girl he was obviously attracted to, revealing his pink underwear. Jaret pulls the bully's pants down onstage as his act of revenge. He then explodes in embarrassment after a sign stating "TOO SMALL FOR TV" appears strategically over his crotch.

Finally, guitarist Chris Burney has a flashback of him being slipped a laxative by a cheerleader and manages to get his own back by consuming a massive sub sandwich, a chili removed from his pants, a white mouse, gasoline, and a goldfish. After jiggling around, he then confronts the popular girl and projectile vomits the contents of his stomach upon her. After Chris' revenge, the band finishes the song, Jaret sticks his guitar pick to his rather sweaty forehead and the video ends with a disclaimer that states "No animals or children under 15 were harmed in the making of this video".

== Chart performance ==
On the week of November 25, 2006, "High School Never Ends" debuted and peaked at number 97 on the Billboard Hot 100, before leaving the chart completely. For the week ending January 28, 2007, the song debuted at number 70 on the UK Singles Chart. It peaked at number 40 the next week and remained on the chart for four weeks.

=== Weekly charts ===
Chart (2006–2007)	Peak position
UK Singles (Official Charts)	40
US Billboard Hot 100	97
US Pop 100 (Billboard)	79
US Adult Pop Airplay (Billboard)	30

== Certifications ==
Region	Certification	Certified units/sales
United Kingdom (BPI)	Silver	200,000^{‡}
United States (RIAA)	Gold	500,000^{‡}
^{‡} Sales+streaming figures based on certification alone.

== Release history ==
Release dates and formats for "High School Never Ends"
Region	Date	Format	Label(s)	Ref.
United States	September 19, 2006	Mainstream airplay	Silvertone; Jive; Zomba	
