= The Summer and the Fall =

Studio album by People on Vacation
- Released: November 22, 2012
- Recorded: 2010–2011; Jaret Reddick's home studio Dallas, Texas
- Genre: Indie rock; pop punk
- Length: 33:25
- Label: Brando
- Producer: Jaret Reddick, Ryan Hamilton, Linus of Hollywood

People on Vacation chronology
Carry On (2011)	The Summer and the Fall (2012)	Holiday Vacation (2012)

The Summer and the Fall is the first studio album by People on Vacation, a supergroup composed of Ryan Hamilton from the indie rock band Smile Smile and Jaret Reddick from the pop punk band Bowling for Soup. The group released their debut EP on November 24, 2011 before releasing The Summer and the Fall on November 22, 2012. The songs "Rainy Day", "It's Not Love" and "Where Do We Go" were previously released on The Carry On EP and "This Is Me" was previously released on the Crappy Records compilation album, Crappy Records Presents: Have a Crappy Summer.

== Track listing ==
All tracks are written by Jaret Reddick and Ryan Hamilton.

No.	Title	Length
1.	"Because of the Sun"	4:02
2.	"We Are the Lucky Ones"	3:32
3.	"Prettiest Girl in the World"	3:49
4.	"I Get You"	2:32
5.	"Back to Being Friends"	3:07
6.	"Lonely Fish"	3:04
7.	"Rainy Day"	3:50
8.	"It's Not Love"	2:39
9.	"This Is Me"	3:27
10.	"Where Do We Go"	3:23

Pre-order bonus tracks
No.	Title	Length
1.	"Give Your Heart a Break" (Demi Lovato cover)	3:30
2.	"Blow Me (One Last Kiss)" (Pink cover)	4:12

=== B-sides ===
- "Mistake (Away from Me)"
- "Punk Rock World"

== Personnel ==
People on Vacation

- Jaret Reddick — vocals, guitar, producer
- Ryan Hamilton — vocals, guitar, keyboards, producer
- Additional musicians:
  - Linus of Hollywood – guitar, keyboards, producer
  - Tom Polce (of Letters to Cleo) – drums
  - James Stant – cello on "Back to Being Friends"
  - Beau Wagener – bass guitar
  - Todd Harwell – drums
