= General admission (disambiguation) =

General admission is a ticketing arrangement for events.

General Admission may also refer to:

- General Admission (Machine Gun Kelly album)
- General Admission (Pat McGee Band album)
