= When We Die =

Single by Bowling for Soup

from the album The Great Burrito Extortion Case
- Released: March 13, 2007
- Recorded: May 15 – June 14, 2006; Pulse Recording; Silverlake, California
- Length: 4:13
- Label: Jive; Zomba
- Songwriters: Jaret Reddick; Butch Walker
- Producer: Butch Walker

Bowling for Soup singles chronology
"High School Never Ends" (2006)	"When We Die" (2007)	"I'm Gay" (2007)

"When We Die" is the second single from the 2006 album The Great Burrito Extortion Case by Bowling for Soup. It was first released in the US officially, during this time "I'm Gay" was released in the UK only. In October 2007, "When We Die" was released in the UK but on download sales only. The song is a departure from the band’s previous comedy-based work, instead featuring a more serious tone.

This song was #68 on MTV Asia's list of Top 100 Hits of 2007. The single spent 13 weeks on the US Adult Pop Airplay chart, peaking at no. 30.

== Music video ==
In the video the soloist's (Jaret Reddick) relationship with his father (played by Lee Majors) since he was a young boy, until this time is seen. At the beginning of the video Jaret is seen sleeping with his pregnant wife (played by Meredith Barnett) in his bed, while waking he is seeing that the day is his father's birthday, and after a few hesitations he makes a phone call. In the phone call his mother answers, and his father refuses to talk with him. After a few scenes some scenes from their past are seen. The young elementary-schooler Jaret, and the high-schooler Jaret. In the first scene Jaret is seen asking his father, while his father is fixing the car, to come and play basketball with him. However, his father refuses and tells him to play by himself. Jaret accidentally hits his father with the basketball while playing and his father immediately shouts at him to leave. In the second scene, Jaret's father is seen sitting on the front porch inviting his son to come and drink cold lemonade with him. Jaret was about to accept the invitation but is interrupted by his band's van pulling over and inviting him in. Jaret leaves his father and enters the band's van. In the ending of the video clip, Jaret had gone with his band back home to make a performance. His parents come to visit him and his wife who just had the baby. Jaret and his father first give each other a long stare until Jaret's father sees his new grandchild and is proud of his son. Jaret's father gives him a pat on the back for the first time in years.

== Charts ==
Chart (2007)	Peak position
US Adult Pop Airplay (Billboard)	30

== Release history ==
Release dates and formats for "When We Die"
Region	Date	Format	Label(s)	Ref.
United States	March 13, 2007	Mainstream airplay	Jive	
