= Save Me (Pat McGee Band album) =

Studio album by Pat McGee Band
- Released: April 6, 2004
- Studio: Avatar Studios, New York City; Sound Station 7, Providence, Rhode Island
- Genre: Rock
- Length: 44:31
- Label: Warner Bros.
- Producer: Gregg Wattenberg, Marti Frederiksen

Pat McGee Band chronology
| Drive-By Romance (2004) | Save Me (2004) | Vintage Stages Live (2007) |

Save Me is the third studio album recorded by the Richmond, Virginia, based Pat McGee Band. It is a marked departure from the band's previous records as the familiar acoustic guitars and three part harmonies were eschewed in favor of a more raw, electric sound. Four tracks were produced in California with Marti Frederiksen, who had collaborated on their writing. The remainder of the album was laid down in Avatar Studios during late 2003.

== WBR release ==
The Warner Bros. Records version of Save Me was released on April 6, 2004. It was at once both praised and criticized by long-term fans of the band. "Beautiful Ways" was the lead single from the album and was released to radio in July; it failed to break into the Billboard Hot 100 but climbed as high as #36 on the Billboard adult top 40 chart.

Professional ratings
Review scores
| Source | Rating |
|---|---|
| Allmusic | link |

=== Track listing ===
1. "Beautiful Ways" - 3:53
2. "Must Have Been Love" - 4:27
3. "You and I" - 3:59
4. "Now" - 3:43
5. "Don't Give Up" - 4:24
6. "At It Again" - 3:24
7. "Annabel" - 3:58
8. "Never Around" - 4:23
9. "Wonderful" - 3:11
10. "Set Me Free" - 3:53
11. "Shady" - 4:55

=== Enhanced content ===
Save Me is an Enhanced CD that contains a twelve-minute QuickTime video showing the making of the album. It is a mix of behind-the-scenes studio footage and live concert excerpts that were filmed at the Paradise Rock Club in Boston. Guitarist Brian Fechino mixed the audio for the film.

Save Me (Kirtland)

Studio album by Pat McGee Band
- Released: June 28, 2005
- Recorded: Avatar Studios, New York City; Sound Station 7, Providence, RI
- Genre: Rock
- Length: 68:16
- Label: Kirtland Records
- Producer: Gregg Wattenberg, Marti Frederiksen, Brian Fechino

== Kirtland re-release ==
In the fall of 2004, WBR officially stopped supporting Save Me and the Pat McGee Band was dropped from the label. The band was still allowed ownership of the tapes and used them to shop for a new label. Kirtland Records signed the band in April 2005 and repackaged and re-released Save Me on June 28, 2005, with five new acoustic bonus tracks. "Must Have Been Love" was remixed and became the album's second single, released in May approximately one month ahead of the album's street date. A music video was also filmed for "Must Have Been Love" but it has not been seen much outside of internet music sites.

Professional ratings
Review scores
| Source | Rating |
|---|---|
| Allmusic | link |

=== Track listing ===
1. "Beautiful Ways" - 3:53
2. "Must Have Been Love" - 4:05
3. "You and I" - 3:59
4. "Now" - 3:43
5. "Don't Give Up" - 4:24
6. "At It Again" - 3:24
7. "Annabel" - 3:58
8. "Never Around" - 4:23
9. "Wonderful" - 3:11
10. "Set Me Free" - 3:53
11. "Shady" - 4:55
12. "Annabel" (Acoustic) - 4:20
13. "Don't Give Up" (Acoustic) - 4:17
14. "Now" (Acoustic) - 3:45
15. "You and I" (Acoustic) - 3:54
16. "At It Again" (Acoustic) - 3:24

=== Enhanced content ===
The Kirtland Save Me is also an enhanced CD, but has entirely different content from the WBR version. A new Flash menu, similar in design to the new album cover, has a small Flash video containing one of the first cuts of the "Must Have Been Love" music video.

== Personnel ==
- Pat McGee – lead vocals, guitar
- Chardy McEwan – percussion
- Chris Williams – drums
- Brian Fechino – lead guitar
- Jonathan Williams – keyboards, backing vocals
- John Small – bass guitar
- Marti Frederiksen – Hammond organ on "Annabel"
- Allison and Laura Veltz of Cecilia – backing vocals
- String section on "You and I":
  - Adam Grabois – cello
  - Joyce Hammann – violin
  - Conay Kuo – viola
  - Victor Lawrence – cello
  - Ale Mahave – viola
  - Todd Reynolds – violin
  - Mary Rowell – violin
  - Laura Seaton – violin
  - Marti Sweet – violin
  - Paul Woodiel – violin
