= The Great Burrito Extortion Case =

Studio album by Bowling for Soup
- Released: November 7, 2006
- Recorded: May 15 – June 14, 2006
- Studios: Ruby Red Productions (Atlanta, Georgia); Pulse Recording (Silverlake, California); Rosewater Studios (Tulsa, Oklahoma)
- Genre: Pop-punk
- Length: 64:42
- Labels: Jive; Zomba
- Producers: Russ-T Cobb; Jaret Reddick; Butch Walker; Adam Schlesinger (add.)

Bowling for Soup chronology
Bowling for Soup Goes to the Movies (2005)	The Great Burrito Extortion Case (2006)	Bowling for Soup: Live and Very Attractive (2008)

Bowling for Soup studio chronology
A Hangover You Don't Deserve (2004)	The Great Burrito Extortion Case (2006)	Sorry for Partyin' (2009)

Singles from The Great Burrito Extortion Case
- 1. "High School Never Ends" Released: September 19, 2006; 2. "When We Die" Released: 2007; 3. "I'm Gay" Released: 2007

The Great Burrito Extortion Case is the sixth studio album by American rock band Bowling for Soup, released on November 7, 2006 under Zomba and Jive Records.

== Background ==
According to the band on their official website "there are at least 12 verses' worth of total joy for every sort-of-sad chorus about an ex-girlfriend on this record."

== Release ==
In June and July, the band were set to tour with Flashlight Brown, however Flashlight Brown pulled out of the tour due to parting with their label.

This album's first single to be released was "High School Never Ends", which is available on iTunes. It was released on November 7, 2006, through Jive Records. It was originally set to be titled All My Rowdy Friends Are Still Intoxicated or We're Not Fat, We Just Have Small Heads. The album's title originated from the news ticker on the bottom of a TV screen that the group saw when in a hotel bar. The headline said "Burrito Extortion Case," which intrigued the band members.

In July and August 2007, the group went on tour with Mêlée, Quietdrive and Army of Freshmen. They toured Australia in April 2008 with Pennywise, Sum 41, and the Vandals.

== Reception ==
Professional ratings
Review scores
Source	Rating
AbsolutePunk	6.2/10
AllMusic	3/5 stars
Entertainment Weekly	B−
Melodic	3.5/5 stars
Rolling Stone	2/5 stars

AllMusic senior editor Stephen Thomas Erlewine said that the record was "still proudly goofy, poppy punk, stuff that's fun without quite being memorable", but found the band's humor outdated with its '80s pop culture references, saying their "pandering a little bit, trying to deliver what they believe today's teens want," concluding that "even when they're coming across like Gen-X cranks, they're still nimble and melodic, so it's easy enough to listen to The Great Burrito Extortion Case and enjoy it – it sure is hard to get worked up about it, though." Gary Susman from Entertainment Weekly said the album "starts out fun but turns self-indulgent", concluding with, "Still, at least two tunes will lodge forever in your skull. One day, you’ll recall them fondly, and BFS, trafficking in insta-nostalgia, will be there to write a catchy number about that feeling." Rolling Stone's Christian Hoard said that "between the we're-happy-to-be-happy "I'm Gay" and the laudatory "Val Kilmer," the dozens of not really clever jokes about crazy girls and John Mellencamp, and whined harmonies and chug-a-chug guitars that blend together, the songs wear out their charm with a quickness."

The album got an 'Honorable Mention' on Ultimate-Guitar's top ten albums of 2006, and debuted at number 88 on the Billboard 200.

== Track listing ==
All tracks are written by Jaret Reddick, with additional songwriters listed.

No.	Title	Writer(s)	Length
1.	"Epiphany"	Zac Maloy	4:12
2.	"High School Never Ends"	Adam Schlesinger	3:31
3.	"Val Kilmer"	Maloy	3:34
4.	"I'm Gay"		3:29
5.	"Why Don't I Miss You?"	Stacy Jones	3:51
6.	"A Friendly Goodbye"		3:30
7.	"Luckiest Loser"	Jones	3:50
8.	"Love Sick Stomach Ache (Sugar Coated Accident)"	Maloy	4:08
9.	"Much More Beautiful Person" (with Lesley Roy)	Mitch Allan	3:27
10.	"Friends Like You"		2:33
11.	"When We Die"	Butch Walker	4:15
12.	"99 Biker Friends"	Maloy	3:17
13.	"Don't Let It Be Love"	Maloy	3:28
14.	"If You Come Back to Me" (includes "Outro" hidden track)	Maloy	20:13
Total length:			64:42

Bonus tracks

UK Edition
No.	Title	Writer(s)	Length
15.	"Everyday's a Saturday"	Maloy	3:32
16.	"No Opinion" (Acoustic)		3:30
Total length:			71:44

Japan Edition
No.	Title	Writer(s)	Length
15.	"...Baby One More Time"	Max Martin	3:30
16.	"No Opinion" (Acoustic)		3:30
Total length:			71:42

Hastings Edition
No.	Title	Writer(s)	Length
15.	"Home Alone"	Allan	3:26
Total length:			68:16

iTunes Edition
No.	Title	Writer(s)	Length
15.	"Not a Love Song"	Coplan	3:36
Total length:			68:25

Napster Edition
No.	Title	Writer(s)	Length
15.	"Straight to Video"	Walker	2:48
Total length:			67:29

Rhapsody Edition
No.	Title	Length
15.	"No Opinion" (Acoustic)	3:30
Total length:		68:12

Wal-Mart Edition
No.	Title	Length
15.	"Good to Be Me"	2:32
Total length:		67:25

Many of the bonus tracks were released in 2008 on the Japanese 2008 Re-Issue of Bowling for Soup Goes to the Movies.

=== B-sides ===
No.	Title	Writer(s)	Length
1.	"Much More Beautiful Person (Acoustic Version)" (UK "High School Never Ends" single b-side)		3:41
2.	"Ride of a Lifetime" (UK "I'm Gay" single b-side)		2:58
3.	"London Bridge (Radio Edit)" (UK "I'm Gay" single b-side)		3:37
4.	"Got Beat Up By a Girl^{[A]}" (demo)		4:27
5.	"Are You Kidding Me?^{[B]}" (demo)	Maloy	4:04
6.	"Hey Hey Joline^{[C]}" (demo)		4:09
7.	"Everyday's a Saturday^{[D]}" (live demo)		3:39

== Personnel ==
Bowling for Soup

- Jaret Reddick — lead vocals, guitars
- Erik Chandler — bass, vocals
- Chris Burney — guitars, backing vocals
- Gary Wiseman — drums

Production

- Russ-T Cobb — producer, mixing, engineering
- Jaret Reddick — producer
- Butch Walker — producer on "When We Die"
- Adam Schlesinger — additional production on "High School Never Ends"
- Casey Diiorio — engineering
- Sean Loughlin and James Salter — assistant engineers
- Karl Egsieker — recording and engineering
- Rob Mathes — strings arrangement and conduction
- Mark Mandelbaum — recording
- Alex Veneguer — assisting
- Tom Lord-Alge — mixing on "High School Never Ends"
- Howie Weinberg — mastering

Additional performers

- Russ-T Cobb — "Make Mine a Decaf," "So ugh...you got my money"
- Casey Diiorio — "Someone drank my birthday present," "That's what happens man"
- Zac Maloy — "you guys aren't going to be seeing much of me for the rest of the week," "pretty, pretty good!!!"
- Butch Walker — guitar, keyboards, and percussion on "When We Die"
- Adam Schlesinger – guitar and vocals on "High School Never Ends"
- Joey Huffman – additional organ, piano and moog
- Lesley Roy — vocals on "Much More Beautiful Person"
- Rob Mathes (piano), Sandra Park, Tomas K. Carney, Michael Casteel, Vivek Kamath, Shmuel Katz, Lisa E. Kim, Maria Kitsopoulos, Elizabeth Lim-Dutton, Suzanne Ornstein, Larua J. Seaton, Sarah J. Seiver, Sharon H. Yamada, Jung Sun Yoo, Rebecca H. Young — orchestra on "When We Die"
- Greg Lobdell, Neal Tiemann, BRANDO, Bryan Jewett, Andy Skib, Alexis "Lyndsay" Skib, Josh Center, Davey Danger — gang vocals, whistling, drinking, laughing, poking and prodding
- Nikki Messing, Niki Smith, Kira Von Sutra, Lindsey Campbell, April Farmer — vocals on "Friends Like You"

Crew

- Greg Lobdell — drum technologist, monitors and the Chiefs
- Edo Levi — front of house, stage manager, DJ and the Star of David
- Sean Bailey — tour manager, one liners and bus pooper
- Bobby-Wayne — guitar tech, bass tech and Beelzebub
- Dave "Mrs. Garrett" Hale — merch, taker upper of slack, anxiety and lifetime
- Pablo Mathiason — A&R
- Mike Swinford, Paul Nugent and Randy Miller — management at Rainmaker Artists
- Andy Somers for The Agency Group/Paul Bolton from Helter Skelter (UK/Europe) — booking
- Michael L. McKoy, Esq., for Serling Rooks and Ferrara — legal

Locations

- Mixed at Ruby Red Productions
- "High School Never Ends" mixed at South Beach Studios, Miami, FL
- Mastered at Masterdisk, NYC
- Gang vocals & various recorded in Tulsa, OK
- Assisted at Legacy Recording Studios, NYC

== Charts ==
Chart performance
Chart (2006–2007)	Peak position
Scottish Albums (Official Charts)	46
UK Albums (Official Charts)	43
UK Album Downloads (Official Charts)	50
UK Physical Albums (OCC)	44
US Billboard 200	88

== Release history ==
Release history
Region	Date
United States	November 7, 2006
United Kingdom	February 5, 2007

== Notes ==
- A Featured in frontman Jaret Reddick's second Bowling for Soup podcast, released November 30, 2009.
- B Featured in frontman Jaret Reddick's third Bowling for Soup podcast, released December 16, 2009.
- C Featured in frontman Jaret Reddick's fourth Bowling for Soup podcast, released January 7, 2010.
- D Featured in frontman Jaret Reddick's seventh Bowling for Soup podcast, released March 10, 2010.
