= Drive-By Romance =

Live album by Pat McGee Band

Live album by Pat McGee Band
- Released: February 24, 2004
- Recorded: Boston, Massachusetts
- Genre: Rock
- Length: 29:37
- Label: Warner Bros. (2004)
- Producer: Pat McGee Band

Pat McGee Band chronology
Shine (2000)	Drive-By Romance (2004)	Save Me (2004-2005)

Drive-By Romance is the title of a digital-only EP released by the Richmond, Virginia, based Pat McGee Band.

Romance was released in February 2004 in support of the single "Beautiful Ways" which had been released to radio earlier in the year. The single version of the song is the lead track of the EP, followed by four live tracks performed in Boston during the summer of 2003.

The title of the EP comes from a lyric in the PMB song "Wonderful," which can be found on Save Me.

== Track listing ==
1. "Beautiful Ways" – 3:53 (single version)
2. "Runaway" – 8:26
3. "Set Me Free" – 4:06
4. "Lost" – 6:07
5. "Shine" – 7:05

== Personnel ==
Pat McGee – acoustic and electric guitars, vocals
Brian Fechino – electric and lap steel guitars
Crix Reardon – bass
Chris Williams – drums
Chardy McEwan – percussion
Michael Ghegan – saxophone
Unknown? - keyboards
