= Pat McGee Band =

American rock band

- Lead singer Pat McGee performing in 2006

Background information
- Origin: Richmond, Virginia
- Genres: Rock, folk
- Years active: 1996–present
- Labels: Giant; Warner Bros. Kirtland
- Members: Brian Fechino; Chardy McEwan; Pat McGee; Chris "Crix" Reardon; Jonathan Bryan Williams; Patrick "Trick" McAloon
- Past members: John Small; Al Walsh; Chris Williams; Todd Wright
- Website: www.patmcgee.net

The Pat McGee Band is a rock band from Richmond, Virginia. Formed by frontman Pat McGee, who attended Longwood College in Farmville, Virginia. After a brief stint learning the piano, he started to play the left-handed guitar owned by his brother, Hugh.

On the heels of his solo release From the Wood in 1995, the Pat McGee Band signed with Warner Bros. Records subsidiary Giant Records in 1999. Shine, the band's major-label debut, was released in 2000 with the national singles "Runaway" and "Rebecca". After two years of delays, the band released their second album with Warner, Save Me, in 2004. The band was dropped from the label that year and picked up by Kirtland Records. An enhanced Save Me is now being distributed through Kirtland with the radio single "Must Have Been Love".

Former guitarist and vocalist Al Walsh left the band in an amicable split at the end of 2001. Keyboardist and vocalist Jonathan Bryan Williams left in 2003 but rejoined the band in late 2005. Both were significant contributors to the band's sound, particularly in the form of backing vocals. The band didn't add another background vocalist until the 2003 addition of keyboardist/guitarist Todd Wright.

Longtime bassist John Small left the band in 2004. With Jonathan's return, Todd Wright left the band. Wright became the front man of his own band, Getaway Car, where he's backed by guitarist Matt Miceli and bass player Crix Reardon (who is still also a member of the Pat McGee Band).

Drummer Chris Williams died in his home October 28, 2006 from complications due to a heart condition.

By June 2007, the band had severed ties with Kirtland Records and was once again recording independently.

By 2008, Matt "Chew" Calvarese had increasingly sat in as the band's new drummer.

== Discography ==
- 1995: From the Wood (Pat McGee solo release)
- 1997: Revel (independent release)
- 1999: General Admission (independent release)
- 2000: Shine U.S. #181
- 2004: Save Me
- 2004: Drive-By Romance iTunes and Napster-only EP of mostly live tracks to promote Save Me
- 2005: Save Me (Kirtland re-release)
- 2006: Vintage Stages Live live concert CD/DVD set
- 2007: These Days (The Virginia Sessions) (independent release)
- 2009: These Days (The Virginia Sessions) (Rock Ridge Music as Pat McGee solo)
- 2009: Live From The Southland (Rock Ridge Music as Pat McGee solo)
- 2011: No Wrong Way to Make it Right (independent release)
- 2015: Pat McGee (independent release)
- 2020: Sugar Packet (independent release)

Additional appearances

- 2000: Live in the X Lounge III "Shine" (live)
- 2000: Cities 97 Sampler Volume 12 "Runaway" (live)
