= The Hourly Radio =

- Origin: Dallas, Texas, USA
- Genres: Indie rock
- Years active: 2003–2008
- Labels: Kirtland Records
- Members: Aaron Closson; Ryan Short; Adam Vanderkolk; Tim Jansen
- Website: Official site

The Hourly Radio was a Dallas based band consisting of Aaron Closson (vocals and guitar), Ryan Short (guitar), Adam Vanderkolk (drums) and Tim Jansen (bass).

== Origin ==
The band was formed by Aaron Closson and Ryan Short in 2003 when the two met and began writing songs together. After just a few months they managed to borrow the requisite gear from friends and recruited the rest of the line up, which included one of Short's old high school friends, Adam Vanderkolk. After the original bassist Nick Flatt left the band Tim Jansen replaced him in August 2004.

The Hourly Radio toured the United States and England from 2006–2007 with numerous acts including Shiny Toy Guns, Stellastarr*, VHS or Beta, Radio 4 and IAMX.

The band was "Artist of the Day" on July 21, 2006, at Spin.com.

Billboard critic Jason MacNeil named the album History Will Never Hold Me as the No. 1 record of 2006.

In January 2008 Short announced he had left the band, and in July 2008 the band has announced that they had stopped making music together.

Aaron Closson is currently working on a new musical project named The Blessed Isles.

In October 2016 the band reunited for 3 shows celebrate the 10-year anniversary of their debut album, History Will Never Hold Me. The reunion shows were held in Dallas, TX, Fort Worth, TX and New York, NY.

== Discography ==
=== Albums ===
- History Will Never Hold Me (2006, Kirtland Records)

=== EPs ===
- Lure Of The Underground (2005, Self-released)
- Gun In Hand (2007, Self-released)
