= Pop Drunk Snot Bread =

Studio album by Bowling for Soup
- Released: April 22, 2022
- Recorded: 2019–2021
- Studios: Soundmine Recording Studio, East Stroudsburg, PA; The Daycare, Prosper, TX; Frog Cabin, Frogtown, CA
- Genre: Pop-punk
- Length: 48:45
- Labels: Brando; Que-so
- Producers: Jarinus (Jaret Reddick & Linus of Hollywood)

Bowling for Soup chronology
A Nice Night for an Evening (2019)	Pop Drunk Snot Bread (2022)	Don't Mind If We Do (2023)

Bowling for Soup studio chronology
Drunk Dynasty (2016)	Pop Drunk Snot Bread (2022)

Singles from Pop Drunk Snot Bread
- 1. "Alexa Bliss" Released: February 6, 2020; 2. "Getting Old Sucks (But Everybody's Doing It)" Released: May 7, 2021; 3. "Killin' 'Em With Kindness" Released: November 19, 2021; 4. "I Wanna Be Brad Pitt" Released: February 25, 2022

Professional ratings
Review scores
Source	Rating
Kerrang!	4/5 stars
Distorted Sound	7/10

Pop Drunk Snot Bread is the eleventh studio album by the American rock band Bowling for Soup, released on April 22, 2022, by Brando and Que-so Records. The album's title is a play on the term "pop punk's not dead". It is their first studio album in nearly 6 years, following 2016's Drunk Dynasty, marking the longest gap between studio albums to date. It is also the first to feature Rob Felicetti on bass and backing vocals, following former bassist Erik Chandler's departure from the band in 2019, and the last to be recorded as a quartet, as lead guitarist Chris Burney retired in January 2025.

Pop Drunk Snot Bread was the first Bowling for Soup studio album to not make it onto any US Billboard charts, although the album was successful in the UK.

== Background and production ==
Following the band's 2016 effort Drunk Dynasty, they originally intended to just release singles, as singer Jaret Reddick stated, "that's what people listen to now". However, they recorded a full album in the Poconos to be able to spend more time together.

The album's debut single, "Alexa Bliss" (based on the WWE wrestler of the same name), came to be when Reddick found out Bliss' favorite band was Bowling for Soup. After some back-and-forth friendly exchanges, and asking his neighbor for bulletpoints on her and her career, Reddick and Linus of Hollywood wrote the song in a night. Bliss appears in the music video, which released on February 6, 2020; as of August 2026, the video has over 6.4 million views on YouTube. The band were set to perform the song during WrestleMania 36, but it was cancelled due to COVID-19. The single charted at #94 on the UK OCC Singles Sales chart, and #72 on the Official Scottish Singles Sales chart.

The second single, "Getting Old Sucks (But Everybody's Doing It)", released on May 7, 2021, incorporated by a music video made by the Roche family the same day, which depicts the band as puppets; the video has over 3.7 million views as of August 2026. On November 19, 2021, the third single, "Killin' 'Em With Kindness", released, with which Reddick said “Watching the news these days is a nightmare for me. It seems that everyone ‘believes’ so greatly on certain issues, that we forget the people on the other side are still human beings. It’s so easy to be kind to one another. And a little kindness does go a very long way.” The album announcement coincided with the release of the fourth single "I Wanna Be Brad Pitt" on February 25, 2022.

== Track listing ==
Pop Drunk Snot Bread track listing
No.	Title	Writer(s)	Length
1.	"Greatest of All Time"	Jaret Reddick; Linus Dotson	2:38
2.	"I Wanna Be Brad Pitt"	Reddick	2:51
3.	"Hello Anxiety"	Reddick; Dotson	2:35
4.	"Getting Old Sucks (But Everybody's Doing It)"	Reddick; Rob Felicetti	3:44
5.	"Bowling for Soup Pee Break"		0:42
6.	"The Best We Can"	Reddick; Dotson	4:12
7.	"Alexa Bliss"	Reddick; Dotson	3:07
8.	"Burn Out"	Reddick; Dotson	3:35
9.	"June Carter Cash (Lost and Found)"	Reddick; Felicetti	3:04
10.	"Public Service Announcement"		0:39
11.	"Killin' 'Em with Kindness"	Reddick	3:11
12.	"Wouldn't Change a Thing"	Reddick; Zachary Maloy	3:32
13.	"The Letter 3 (Sitcom Song)"	Reddick; Dotson; Felicetti	3:49
14.	"After All These Beers"	Reddick; Joe Ragosta; Dotson	3:18
15.	"Greatest of All Time (Reprise)" (Song ends at 1:01. Afterwards is silence until 4:00, at which point the hidden track "Belgium" begins.)	Reddick; Erik Chandler; Eric Delegard	7:48
Total length:			48:45

== Personnel ==
=== Bowling for Soup ===
- Jaret Reddick – lead vocals, rhythm guitar
- Chris Burney – lead guitar, backing vocals
- Rob Felicetti – bass, backing vocals
- Gary Wiseman – drums, backing vocals

=== Production ===
- Jarinus – producers, engineering
- Linus of Hollywood – mixing, additional music and vocals
- A.J. Larsen – engineering
- Paul Logus – mastering
- Christopher Harrison – editing
- Dave Pearson – artwork
- Chris Shary – inside cover character illustrations
- Bowling for Soup, Ted Felicetti, A.J. Larsen, Diane Small, Dave Hale, Linus of Hollywood – gang vocals

== Charts ==
Chart performance for Pop Drunk Snot Bread
Chart (2022)	Peak position
UK Album Sales (OCC)	80
UK Album Downloads (Official Charts)	27
UK Independent Albums (Official Charts)	37
UK Physical Albums (OCC)	73
UK Rock & Metal Albums (Official Charts)	13
