= These Days (The Virginia Sessions) =

Album released by Pat McGee Band

Studio album by Pat McGee Band
- Released: July 6, 2007
- Recorded: Richmond, Virginia, US
- Length: 36:21
- Label: independent release
- Producer: Todd Wright

Pat McGee Band chronology
Vintage Stages Live (2007)	These Days (The Virginia Sessions) (2007)

These Days (The Virginia Sessions) is an album released by the Richmond, Virginia, based Pat McGee Band. It was produced by former keyboardist Todd Wright and was officially released at their July 6, 2007, concert at the Wolf Trap National Park for the Performing Arts, though it had been available on compact disc and via digital download beginning July 1.

The record and the lyrics to "End of October" were dedicated to Chris Williams, who died October 29, 2006.

== Track listing ==
1. "Guess We Were" 3:45
2. "I Don't Think I'm Listening" 3:32
3. "Elizabeth" 3:48
4. "Come Back Home" 4:09
5. "All Over You" 4:07
6. "Maybe It's Time" 5:20
7. "The Hand That Holds You" 4:43
8. "You Want It All" 3:06
9. "The End of October" 3:51

== Personnel ==
- Pat McGee: guitars, lead vocals
- Brian Fechino: guitars, backing vocals
- Crix Reardon: bass, backing vocals
- Jonathan Williams: keyboards, backing vocals
- Chardy McEwan: percussion, backing vocals
- Chris Williams: drum loops
- Chris Bashista: drums
- Michael Ghegan: tenor saxophone
- Todd Wright: "lots of things cool"
- Nate Brown: drums
- Al Walsh: backing vocals
- Hugh McGee: backing vocals
- Mike Meadows: cello

== Reception ==
Professional ratings
Review scores
Source	Rating
AllMusic	3.5/5 stars

William Ruhlmann of AllMusic said Pat McGee's performance on These Days created a deeper album than previous Pat McGee Band albums.
