= Punk Rock Saves Lives =

Nonprofit organization

- Formation: 2019; 7 years ago
- Founders: Rob Rushing, Tina Rushing
- Type: Non-profit
- Tax ID no.: 84-3093371
- Headquarters: Denver, Colorado, U.S.
- Region served: United States
- Website: www.punkrocksaveslives.org

Punk Rock Saves Lives (PRSL) is a nonprofit organization that seeks to raise mental health awareness, support bone marrow donations through registration, and promotes harm reduction through the distribution of Narcan and fentanyl testing strips to those in the punk community. As of June 2026, PRSL is active in 23 cities within the United States, and to date, has added more than 25,000 participants to the national bone-marrow registry.

== History ==
PRSL was co-founded in November 2019 by Rob and Tina Rushing in Denver, Colorado. The pair started PRSL after being laid off from their roles at another Denver nonprofit, Love, Hope, Strength. In addition to his nonprofit experience, Rob is a former roadie, band manager, and tour organizer. He is the former tour driver for Anti-Flag, and has toured with other bands, like Anberlin. Tina has also toured with bands like New Found Glory and Yellowcard. Jaret Reddick, lead vocalist of Bowling for Soup, serves on the board of directors for PRSL.

During the COVID-19 pandemic, PRSL established a mental health group, allowing the nonprofit to continue to operate despite the lack of a physical presence. In addition to this, the nonprofit put on an outdoor concert series at the end of the pandemic, called Positive Mental Attitude, inspired by the same concept written about by self-help author Napoleon Hill and popularized by the punk band Bad Brains.

In 2022, PRSL returned to physical events, appearing at Lollapalooza.

In 2023, PRSL toured with Flogging Molly, taking cheek swabs at shows for potential bone marrow donors.

In 2024, PRSL appeared at the Bonnaroo Music and Arts Festival, having a presence in the festival's Non-Profit Village.

In 2025, PRSL co-hosted "The Femmes Are Giving", a San Francisco concert featuring femme-fronted punk bands.

=== Punk Rock Saves Lives festival ===
In 2022, PRSL debuted the Punk Rock Saves Lives Festival in Denver, and created a compilation album to pair with the event. The festival was previously headlined by Bad Cop/Bad Cop, and has included femme punk, queer, trans, and BIPOC punk bands as part of its lineup.
