= Dude, We're Getting the Band Back Together =

- Phineas and Ferb episode
- For their wedding anniversary, Linda and Fawrence recreate their first kiss at Love Händel's reunion concert.
- Episode no.: Season 1 Episode 14
- Directed by: Dan Povenmire
- Written by: Bobby Gaylor, Martin Olson (story); Chris Headrick, Chong Lee (storyboards)
- Production code: 114
- Original air dates: March 8, 2008 (Disney Channel); October 2, 2008 (Toon Disney); February 13, 2009 (Disney XD)

Guest appearances
- Jaret Reddick as Danny; Carlos Alazraqui as Bobbi Fabulous; Steve Zahn as Swampy/Sherman

Episode chronology
| ← Previous "The Ballad of Badbeard" | Next → "Ready for the Bettys" |
- Phineas and Ferb (season 1)

"Dude, We're Getting the Band Back Together" is the 14th episode of the American animated television series Phineas and Ferb. It originally aired on Disney Channel on March 8, 2008, and later aired on Toon Disney on October 2, 2008 in the United States. It was also the first program to air on Disney XD immediately following Toon Disney's closure at midnight on February 13, 2009. The plot concerns an attempt by stepbrothers Phineas and Ferb to reform the band Love Händel for their parents' wedding anniversary.

The story was written by Bobby Gaylor and Martin Olson, and storyboarded by Chris Headrick and Chong Lee. It was directed by series co-creator Dan Povenmire. The episode's central characters, the members of Love Händel, are parodies of three of the production staff, Gaylor, Povenmire, and Jeff "Swampy" Marsh. Jaret Reddick, Carlos Alazraqui, and Steve Zahn guest starred as Love Händel members Danny, Bobbi Fabulous and Sherman/Swampy, respectively.

"Dude, We're Getting the Band Back Together" was well received and is considered a fan favorite. It has been referred to by the Phineas and Ferb co-creators as one of their favorite episodes in several different interviews. The episode garnered a Primetime Emmy Award nomination for the song "Ain't Got Rhythm" in the category "Outstanding Original Music and Lyrics."

== Plot ==
External videos
- Dude, We're Getting the Band Back Together S1 E14 Full Episode Phineas and Ferb @disneyxd — Official upload of the episode onto YouTube

Phineas and Ferb's parents, Linda and Lawrence, are arguing over something Lawrence has forgotten. Linda goes out alone for the afternoon, leaving Lawrence confused; then Candace informs him that today is his wedding anniversary. Lawrence goes to the garage to search for a gift and discovers an old album by Love Händel: he explains to the children that he and Linda shared their first kiss at the band's farewell concert. Lawrence despairs of recapturing the moment, but Candace, Phineas, and Ferb watch a Where Are They Now?-type special about Love Händel, and decide to reform the band. Candace tries to keep Linda away from the house while Phineas and Ferb are looking for the members of the band.

Meanwhile, Perry breaks into Dr. Doofenshmirtz's hideout, only to discover that he is only putting a birthday party for his 16-year-old daughter Vanessa. Doofenshmirtz explains that he has been trying to give out the best birthday parties for her, but failed for some reasons, as she felt so extremely unhappy about her birthdays all her life (this was evident of several birthday photos that Doofenshmirtz shows to Perry in his wallet). Seeing this, Perry agrees to set aside his rivalry and help Doofenshmirtz prepare for the party.

Phineas and Ferb set out to convince the members of Love Händel—lead singer Danny, bassist Bobbi Fabulous, and drummer Swampy (whose real name is Sherman)—to reform. Danny alone agrees immediately, with a song; Bobbi and Swampy needed convincing (as Danny wished them luck on it), through song as well. At the same time, Isabella and the Fireside Girls are starting the stage building. Lawrence, at the same time, tries to cater a small dinner and hires a singing telegram; unfortunately, the dinner catches fire, and Lawrence's hastily planned evening goes up in smoke. Phineas and Ferb arrive and assure Lawrence that all is well, explaining that the band has agreed to reform. Meanwhile, Candace continues keeping Linda away from the house by taking her to the mall to try on some dresses.

Doofenshmirtz, back at his lair, ties Perry to a giant firecracker rocket, explaining that he will end the party with fireworks and explode Perry at the same time. When Vanessa arrives, however, she hates the childish, "girly" theme Doofenshmirtz has chosen and sits down to mope at a table, fearing that this would embarrass her in front of her arriving goth friends. At Phineas and Ferb's house, Love Händel's rehearsal descends into infighting; sure that no one will want to hear them anymore, the band are again on the verging of breaking up when they hear the roar of the crowd. Meanwhile, Doofenshmirtz mopes of failing another attempt of giving Vanessa a good party, so he decides to ignite Perry's rocket to cheer himself up, but Perry frees himself and a fight ensues, during which Doofenshmirtz becomes tied to the rocket by accident instead. At the same moment, the band begins to play; Candace and Linda arrive home. Linda reunites with her husband, and eventually kiss, thanks to some motivation from Ferb, who yells to Lawrence to kiss her.

The explosion as Doofenshmirtz's firecracker rocket launches leaves the lair filthy and partly destroyed; the creepy look thrills Vanessa's arriving goth friends (including her boyfriend Johnny), who find it to be cool. Touched by this, Vanessa happily thanks both her father for getting one birthday party right for her and Perry for helping her father out. As the rocket ascends, Doofenshmirtz is himself cursing Perry, as usual, but pauses to notice Love Handel singing below. The band finish their song just as Doofenshmirtz's rocket explodes with a heart-shaped flare. The episode ends with Love Handel singing "Music Makes Us Better" and with everyone (including Doofenshmirtz, who has survived the explosion unscathed) dancing during the end credits.

== Production ==
"Dude, We're Getting the Band Back Together" was written by Bobby Gaylor and Martin Olson, with storyboards by Chris Headrick and Chong Lee. Series co-creator Dan Povenmire directed the episode. Povenmire and Headrick had previously collaborated on a direct-to-video Looney Tunes short entitled Hare and Loathing in Las Vegas.

Each member of Love Händel was inspired by a member of the production team, who had previously been musicians themselves. Danny was named after and based on Povenmire, Bobbi Fabulous on Gaylor, and Swampy on co-creator Jeff "Swampy" Marsh. Povenmire and Marsh each played in different bands in Los Angeles for over a decade. Gaylor was a spoken word performer who played pop and rock music; he recorded an album titled Fuzzatronic Dreams.

As well as the show's regular voice actor cast members, "Dude, We're Getting the Band Back Together" featured guest stars in the roles of the three band members. Jaret Reddick (the leader of the Grammy-nominated band Bowling for Soup, who also perform the show's Emmy-nominated theme song), Carlos Alazraqui, and Steve Zahn portrayed each of the bandmates (Reddick as Danny, Alazraqui as Bobbi and Zahn as Swampy respectively).

== Reception ==
"It's our [the co-creators] favorite episode. We just love it. We like all the songs. The story has a really good feel to it and it's sort of touching in the end."

— Dan Povenmire

The episode received critical acclaim from critics and fans. Newsarama reporter Steve Fritz called the episode a fan favorite. Fritz praised it for demonstrating "incredible ways to play within the walls of [the show's] formula, constantly coming up with refreshingly different plot lines."

The episode was also popular among the production staff: Povenmire named it as his and Marsh's favorite, citing the quality of the songs, the "sort of touching" ending, and the "really good feel" of the story. In April 2009, Marsh cited "Rollercoaster" as his favorite, tying "Dude, We're Getting the Band Back Together" in second place with "The Chronicles of Meap".

One of the episode's songs, "Ain't Got Rhythm", was nominated for a Primetime Emmy Award in the category "Outstanding Original Music and Lyrics" later in 2008. The nomination credited Danny Jacob, Marsh, Povenmire, Olson, and Robert Hughes for the song. This was the series' second Emmy nomination for songwriting.

=== Further appearances ===
Love Händel made a cameo appearance in the season two episode "Thaddeus and Thor". In this episode, Doofenshmirtz sings about his childhood to the tune of the song "Snuck Your Way into My Heart", then introduces the band to finish the song. He then gloats to Perry about having the band appear in his "back story". Three songs featured in the episode ("Ain't Got Rhythm," "Fabulous," and "You Snuck Your Way Right Into My Heart") are available on the self-entitled Phineas and Ferb soundtrack. "Danny's Story" and "Music Make Us Better" are not included. "Ain't Got Rhythm" was voted #8 on Phineas and Ferb's Musical Cliptastic Countdown, a viewer-voted countdown of the best songs from the first season of the show. The band is also shown in "Just Passing Through" as well as "Hip Hip Parade" and also sang two songs in the episode "Phineas and Ferb: Summer Belongs to You!": "Bouncin' Around the World" and "The Ballad of Klimpaloon", the latter only available on the soundtrack. They also made an appearance in the "Carpe Diem" song in "Rollercoaster: The Musical!"
