= Disney XD =

American pay television channel

- Logo used since June 1, 2015
- Country: United States
- Broadcast area: Nationwide
- Headquarters: Burbank, California, U.S.

Programming
- Languages: English; Spanish (via SAP audio track, a Spanish language simulcast of the channel is also available)
- Picture format: HDTV 720p (downscaled to center cut 480i for the SD feed)

Ownership
- Owner: Disney Entertainment; (The Walt Disney Company)
- Parent: Disney Kids & Family
- Sister channels: List: ABC; Disney Channel; Disney Jr.; Freeform; FX; FXX; FXM

History
- Launched: February 13, 2009; 17 years ago
- Replaced: Toon Disney; Jetix

Links
- Webcast: Watch live
- Website: DisneyNOW portal

Availability

Streaming media
- Affiliated Streaming Service: Disney+
- Sling TV, YouTube TV, Hulu + Live TV, FuboTV, DirecTV Stream, Vidgo

Disney XD is an American pay television channel owned by the Disney Kids & Family and Disney Entertainment units of The Walt Disney Company. The channel is aimed primarily at older children ages six to eleven years old.

Disney XD's programming consists of original first-run television series, current and former original series and made-for-television films inherited from sister network Disney Channel, theatrically released films, and acquired programs from other distributors, along with a primetime block of programming involving competitive gaming.

As of November 2023, Disney XD is available to approximately 44,000,000 pay television households in the United States, down from its 2013 peak of 82,000,000 households. In recent years, Disney XD's carriage has declined with the growth of streaming alternatives including its parent company's Disney+, and has generally been depreciated by Disney in current retransmission consent negotiations with cable and streaming providers. Notably, the channel was removed in negotiations with Verizon Fios in 2025, and was unavailable on Charter Spectrum from 2023 to 2025.

== History ==
Logo used from February 13, 2009 to June 1, 2015

Disney XD was launched on February 13, 2009, at 12:00 a.m. Eastern Time, with the Phineas and Ferb episode "Dude, We're Getting the Band Back Together" being the first show to air on the channel. The channel premiered its first original series, Aaron Stone, at 7:00 p.m. New animated series included in the channel's initial lineup were Kid vs. Kat and Jimmy Two-Shoes.

The network replaced Toon Disney, an animation-focused channel that was launched on April 18, 1998, which eventually launched a live-action/animation block called Jetix in 2004. Jetix channels outside of the United States were relaunched under the Disney XD banner starting with the France-based service on April 1, 2009. Many of the channel's programs (particularly animated series) previously aired on Toon Disney, mainly as part of the Jetix programming block, which ran on Toon Disney until that channel's shutdown. Disney XD carries the same name as an unrelated mini-site and media player on Disney.com, which stood for Disney Xtreme Digital. According to Gary Marsh, President of Entertainment for Disney Channel Worldwide, "XD" does not have an actual meaning and was chosen simply because it looked "cool." Marsh notes that "the letter X has many cool associations" and that "the beauty of it is the audience can imbue it with all sorts of positive attributes." "XD" is also an emoticon for laughter.

The channel's first original television movie, Skyrunners, premiered on November 27, 2009. On April 1, 2012, Disney XD launched a block called "Marvel Universe", as a result of Disney's 2009 acquisition of Marvel Entertainment. By June 2014, Disney XD agreed to a multi-picture development deal with Two 4 the Money and MarVista Entertainment with MarVista having global rights.

On November 17, 2016, it was announced that the Pokémon anime series would be moving to Disney XD from its previous broadcaster, Cartoon Network. The twentieth season, Pokémon the Series: Sun & Moon, was the first season to air and was first broadcast as a sneak peek on December 5, 2016. Pokémon began its regular broadcast on May 12, 2017.

On August 12, 2017, Disney XD premiered a reboot of DuckTales. In 2018, through a series of promos and news announcements, Disney announced that four of Disney XD's original series (those being Star vs. the Forces of Evil, Milo Murphy's Law, DuckTales, and Big Hero 6: The Series) would be moving their premieres over to Disney Channel, while Disney XD would continue to air reruns. In 2020, DuckTales and Big Hero 6: The Series both returned to Disney XD for their final seasons, both of which ended in 2021.

== Programming ==
Disney XD's schedule consists largely of animated and live-action programs aimed at pre-teens and young teenagers. Disney XD content is a mixture of former original series as well as programs inherited from sister network Disney Channel. In addition to full-length live-action and animated original series, the channel also airs short series similar to those seen on Disney Channel during commercial breaks (such as Two More Eggs), which serve as filler for programs scheduled to end during the half-hour and last usually around one to three minutes.

In addition, Disney XD airs Disney Channel Original Movies and theatrically released feature films.

Unlike Disney Channel (and similarly, fellow sister network Disney Jr.), whose advertising comes in the form of program promotions, underwriter sponsorships, and interstitials for Disney films, home video, and game releases produced by the channel, Disney XD operates as an advertiser-supported service running traditional television commercials in addition to promotions for the channel's shows.

=== Sports ===
Sister network ESPN has produced sports-oriented content for Disney XD; for a period, the channel produced an interstitial program known as the SportsCenter High-5, which featured a countdown of sports highlights. As part of a deal with ESPN, Disney XD carried coverage of the 2018 Overwatch League as part of its D|XP block.

In 2019, Disney XD began to air the NFL's Pro Bowl, in a simulcast alongside ESPN and ABC.

In March 2023, the channel participated in another sports broadcast as part of ESPN's NHL coverage, with Disney Channel and Disney XD airing a 3D animated, Big City Greens-themed presentation of a game.

=== Programming blocks ===
- Randomation Animation – Randomation Animation was a morning animation block on Saturdays from 8:00 to 11:00 a.m. Eastern Time, which debuted on July 13, 2013. Programs featured in the block included Pac-Man and the Ghostly Adventures, Xiaolin Chronicles, Packages from Planet X, Camp Lakebottom, Max Steel, Randy Cunningham: 9th Grade Ninja, and Phineas and Ferb.
- Show Me the Monday – Show Me the Monday was a Monday night programming block that premiered in late 2013. The block presented new episodes of Disney XD original series such as Lab Rats, Mighty Med, Gravity Falls and others.
- Animacation – Animacation was a morning animation block that aired weekdays from 10:00 a.m. to 1:00 p.m. during the summer of 2014. The block featured new episodes and reruns of original animated programming, as well as the premieres of Doraemon: Gadget Cat from the Future, Boyster and The 7D.
- D|XP – a prime-time block that featured video gaming-related programming aimed at teens; the block was introduced on July 15, 2017, and ran from 9:00 p.m. to. 3:00 a.m. Eastern Time. The block draws upon resources from sister properties, such as the Disney-owned multi-channel network Maker Studios (who produced the weekly Polaris Primetime, and curates content from its member personalities for other programming on the block), ESPN (for e-sports coverage), and Vice Media's Waypoint, as well as outside producers and sources such as IGN. On July 16, D|XP presented coverage of the finals of the Super Smash Bros. for Wii U and Street Fighter V tournaments at Evo 2017, complementing coverage of the event across ESPN networks and Twitch. On July 11, 2018, ESPN announced a multi-year deal with Blizzard Entertainment to air Overwatch League matches on ABC, Disney XD (as a part of the D|XP block) and the ESPN networks, beginning with the 2018 playoffs.
- Anime Block – a block showcasing various anime programs featured on the channel, such as Pokémon, Yo-kai Watch and Beyblade Burst. It launched on February 18, 2017, and aired every Saturday. It was discontinued in 2020 following Netflix's acquisition of the streaming rights to Pokémon.
- Marvel on Disney XD – a block of animated series produced by Marvel Animation that aired Sunday mornings from 8:00 to 9:30 a.m. Eastern Time, which resulted from The Walt Disney Company's 2009 acquisition of Marvel Entertainment. The block launched on April 1, 2012, as Marvel Universe with the premiere of Ultimate Spider-Man, followed by returning series The Avengers: Earth's Mightiest Heroes. It also featured five short series using short-form animated and live-action interstitials. Programs that were featured in the block included Spider-Man (2017), Avengers Assemble, Guardians of the Galaxy, "Marvel Mash-Up" (which features classic Marvel cartoons mashed up with new twists) and "Fury Files".

== Related services ==
Service	Description
Disney XD HD	Disney XD HD is a high definition simulcast of the Disney XD channel that broadcasts in the 720p resolution; the HD feed launched with the standard definition feed of the channel on February 13, 2009. Disney XD's original programming is produced and broadcast in HD, along with feature films, Disney Channel original movies made after 2005 and select episodes, films and series produced before 2009. The HD feed is carried through most providers, excluding Dish.
Disney XD On Demand	Disney XD On Demand is the channel's video-on-demand service, offering select episodes of Disney XD's original series and certain acquired programs to pay television providers.
DisneyNOW	On September 28, 2017, the Disney Channel app was relaunched as DisneyNOW, which combines the apps of Disney Channel, Disney Junior, Disney XD and Radio Disney into one universal app featuring access to all four services. The Disney XD app was discontinued on February 15, 2018.
Former services
Disney XD App	Formerly known as "WATCH Disney XD" until a June 2016 rebranding, the mobile app and digital media player apps for Disney XD offer live and on-demand streaming of Disney XD content online. These apps require users to authenticate with a login from a participating television service provider for access to live video or the newest episodes of a series, though a limited selection of free episodes also are available without a login. The app closed on February 15, 2018.

== International channels ==
Disney XD, similarly born of a merger between Jetix and Toon Disney, was formerly available around the world. Most of the international Disney XD networks have been closed since 2019, due to the launch of Disney+.

On January 6, 2019, Disney XD closed in Australia and New Zealand with programs moving to Disney Channel for that network's last year before shutting down itself with its content being subsumed into Disney+. In India, the channel was rebranded as Marvel HQ on January 9, 2019 which was later rebranded as Super Hungama on March 1, 2022. On October 1, 2019, Disney XD closed in Italy following the non-renewal of its Sky carriage agreement.

The Spanish and German versions were closed on April 1, 2020, followed by France's network a week later. XD in Singapore closed on June 1, 2020, then the British and continental Africa domestic feeds on October 1, 2020. The Southeast Asian, Scandinavian, and Middle Eastern feeds closed on December 31, 2020. The Japanese and Turkish channels also closed on January 31, 2021. The Latin American feed closed on March 31, 2022. The Netherlands feed closed on May 1, 2025.

The latest closure was in Canada on September 1, 2025. Since then, Disney XD only has one international channel operating in Poland.

== See also ==
- Disney Channel - the main channel counterpart to Disney XD
- Toon Disney - predecessor channel to Disney XD
- Jetix - an international brand that aired on Toon Disney
