= People on Vacation =

American rock band

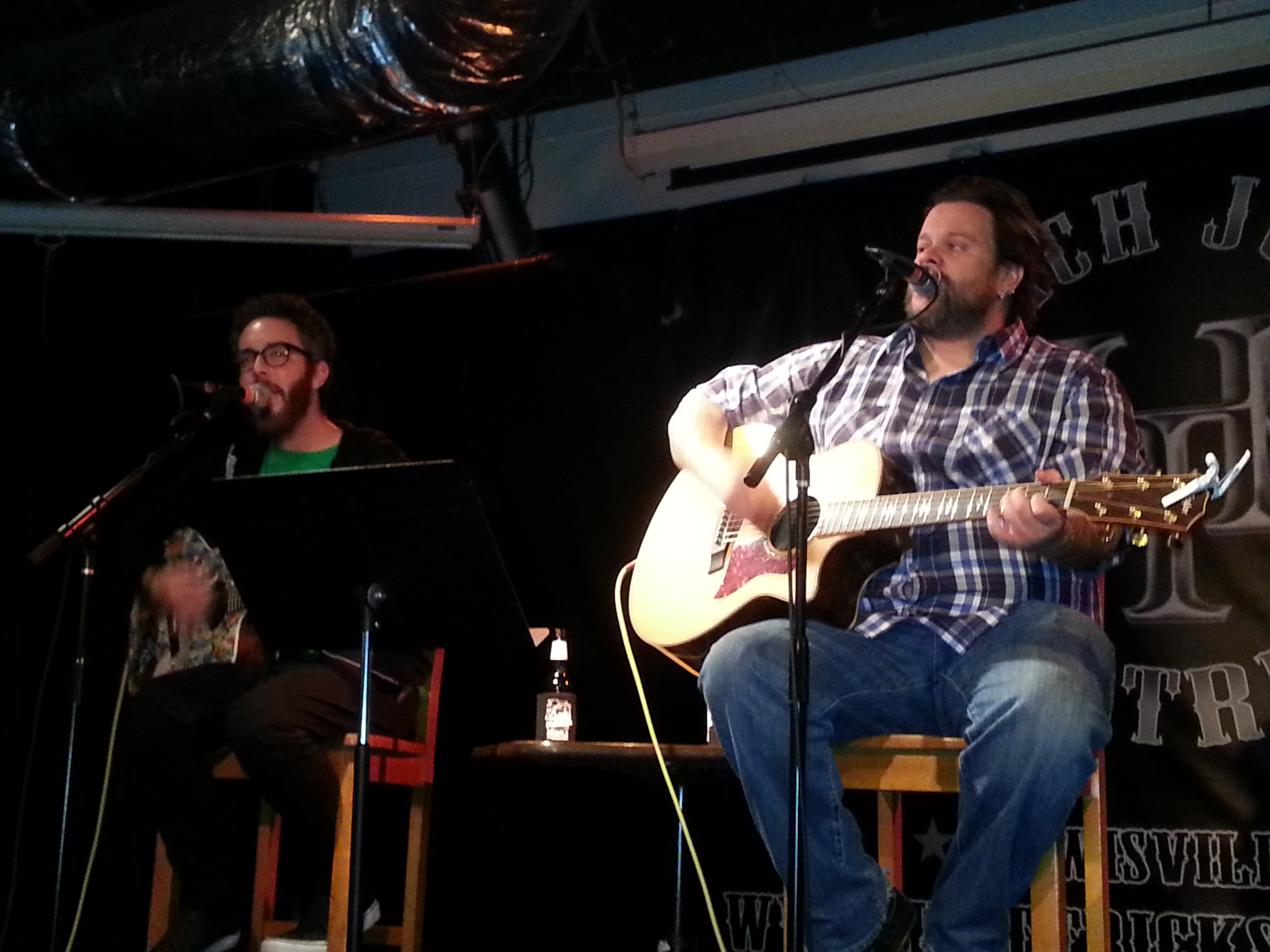

Background information
- Also known as: POV
- Origin: Dallas, Texas, U.S.
- Genres: Indie rock, pop punk
- Years active: 2010–2016
- Labels: Brando, Kirtland
- Members: Ryan Hamilton; Jaret Reddick
- Website: People on Vacation

People on Vacation (often abbreviated as POV) was a collaboration composed of Ryan Hamilton from the indie rock band Smile Smile and Jaret Reddick from the pop punk band Bowling for Soup. The duo's concept is to "tell a story" and to "avoid typical topics such as relationships". The duo describe their genre as indie rock.

== History ==
=== 2010–2012: Formation and Carry On ===
Ryan Hamilton and Jaret Reddick decided to start writing songs together after Hamilton's band, Smile Smile, opened for Reddick's band, Bowling for Soup, on a few of their tour dates. After four days of writing, the duo had written six songs, which later resulted in the formation of the band People on Vacation. The band began streaming a song, "Better Off Dead," on their official site in late 2010. During his eleventh Bowling for Soup podcast regarding the band's newly announced side projects, Reddick played a demo that he described as "the first People on Vacation song," titled "Rainy Day."^{[A]} The band has since announced they have written and recorded fifteen songs and planned to release album in Fall 2011, through Kirtland Records. The band released another song, titled "She Was the Only One," as a free download via Twitter as a "Tweet for a Track" promotion, in addition to streaming it on their official site in January 2011. The band's music video for "Better Off Dead" premiered on the Dallas Observer website on January 19, 2011. In an interview with aduioADD, Hamilton jokingly named the album Buskin' & Name Droppin'. Another song, "Because of the Sun", was played live on 102.1 FM for the first time in March 2011. In order to promote the project, the band joined Bowling for Soup's 2011 UK Acoustic Tour as an opening act, alongside Linus of Hollywood and Erik Chandler and the Mulberry Street Socialites. In July 2011, Reddick explained the band expects "a long EP out around the end of November, with a full length album hoping to be out by next summer with all new material," stating the band has fifteen songs that are "written, recorded, done" except for drums while they have written six to eight other songs that have yet to be recorded. The band had its CD release show for Carry On on November 24, 2011, at the Kessler Theater in Dallas, Texas. Reddick announced in a recent podcast that People on Vacation would be making a music video for the song "Where Do We Go," which the duo filmed with Built By Ninjas in January 2012.

=== 2012-2013: The Summer and The Fall and Holiday Vacation ===
The Summer and the Fall is the debut studio album by People on Vacation. The group released their debut EP on November 24, 2011, before releasing The Summer and the Fall on November 22, 2012. The songs "Rainy Day," "It's Not Love," and "Where Do We Go" were previously released on Carry On and "This Is Me" was previously released on the Crappy Records compilation Crappy Records Presents: Have a Crappy Summer.

People on Vacation announced that they would be headlining their first ever UK show at Borderline in London on March 25, 2012 with Erik Chandler, being the only support act; this event got cancelled due to poor ticket sales.

In 2012 People on Vacation started another Kickstarter project called Holiday Album, which later became Holiday Vacation. The project started in October and was completed in December that year with nine songs. People who pledged $30 or more would get their picture on the album cover and be mentioned in the song "What Would Be Your Christmas Wish". The album was given away for free during the winter of 2014.

=== 2013-2016: The Chronicles of Tim Powers and split ===
The Chronicles of Tim Powers is the second studio album from People on Vacation. Originally scheduled for release on 8 December 2014 and funded through PledgeMusic, the album was released through Brando Records on 3 February 2015. The ensemble offered EP Holiday Vacation to hold fans over until the work was released. The Tim Powers of the title was one of those who pledged and helped fund the album's recording.

Hamilton posted a video on his new bands Pledge Music page, explaining that he and Reddick have gone their separate ways but no explanation as to why they split.

== Band members ==
Former members

- Ryan Hamilton – lead vocals, guitar, keyboards (2010–2016)
- Jaret Reddick – lead vocals, guitar, keyboards (2010–2016)

Touring members

- Linus of Hollywood – keyboards, guitar, backing vocals (2010–2016); also performed on The Carry On EP (2011) and The Summer and the Fall (2012)
- Beau Wagener – bass, backing vocals (2011–2016); also performed on The Summer and the Fall (2012)
- Todd Harwell – drums (2011–2016); also performed on The Summer and the Fall (2012)
- Rob Lane – bass, backing vocals (2013–2016); (UK dates)
- Mickey Richards – drums

Studio members

- Tom Polce – drums on The Carry On EP (2011) and The Summer and the Fall (2012)
- Erik Chandler – bass on The Carry On EP (2011)
- James Stant – cello on "Back to Being Friends" from The Summer and the Fall (2012) cello (2012 (touring guest))

== Discography ==
=== Studio albums ===
- The Summer and the Fall (2012)
- The Chronicles of Tim Powers (2015)

=== Compilation albums ===
- Crappy Records Presents: Have a Crappy Summer (2012)
- Holiday Vacation (2012)

=== Extended plays ===
- Carry On (2011)

=== Music videos ===
Year	Title	Director(s)	Album
2011	"Better Off the Dead"		Carry On
2012	"Where Do We Go"	Built By Ninjas	Carry On; The Summer and the Fall
2012	"Because It's Christmas"		Holiday Vacation
2013	"I Get You (You Got Me)"	Built By Ninjas	The Summer and the Fall
2014	"Punk Rock World"	Ryan Hamilton	The Chronicles Of Tim Powers

== Notes ==
- A Featured in Jaret Reddick's eleventh Bowling for Soup podcast, released November 18, 2010.
