= The Chronicles of Tim Powers =

The Chronicles Of Tim Powers

Studio album by People on Vacation
- Released: February 3, 2015
- Genre: Indie rock, pop punk
- Length: 34:52
- Label: Brando
- Producer: People on Vacation; Linus of Hollywood

People on Vacation chronology
Holiday Vacation (2012)	The Chronicles Of Tim Powers (2015)

The Chronicles Of Tim Powers is the second and final studio album by the American rock duo People on Vacation. Originally scheduled for release on 8 December 2014 and funded through PledgeMusic, the album was released by Brando Records on 3 February 2015. The ensemble offered an EP, Holiday Vacation, to hold fans over until the work was released.

The Tim Powers of the title was one of those who pledged and helped fund the album's recording. A Denton, Texas, criminal defense attorney he has represented numerous radio and music personalities in the Dallas Fort Worth area and is a friend of all of the band members of People on Vacation and Bowling for Soup. His likeness was drawn by Marvel Comics artists.

== Track listing ==
No.	Title	Length
1.	"Don’t Ask The Question"	2:29
2.	"I’ve Got Your Back"	3:14
3.	"You May Not Believe In God"	3:14
4.	"All I Ever Really Wanted"	3:29
5.	"We Shoulda Made It"	2:45
6.	"We All Want What We Can’t Have"	3:11
7.	"She’s Not You"	3:02
8.	"I Might Change My Mind"	2:54
9.	"The Girl I Used To Love"	3:44
10.	"Punk Rock World"	3:12
11.	"Journey To The End"	3:31
Total length:		34:52
