= General Admission (Pat McGee Band album) =

1999 live album by Pat McGee Band

Live album by Pat McGee Band
- Released: 1999
- Venue: The Birchmere, Alexandria, Virginia; The Bayou, Washington, D.C.
- Genre: Rock
- Length: 1:08:37
- Label: Crossman Street, Inc.
- Producer: Pat McGee Band

Pat McGee Band chronology
Revel (1997)	General Admission (1999)	Shine (2000)

Professional ratings
Review scores
Source	Rating
AllMusic	3/5 stars

General Admission is a live acoustic rock album by the Pat McGee Band released on June 15, 1999. It was recorded live without overdubbing at The Bayou in Washington, D.C. and The Birchmere in Alexandria, Virginia. It features ten songs from previous albums Revel and From the Wood.

== Track listing ==
1. "The Story" 5:09
2. "Nobody Knows" 4:57
3. "Who Stole Her From Heaven" 4:41
4. "Flooding Both of Us" 8:42
5. "Could Have Been a Song" 5:27
6. "Pride" 6:00
7. "Can't Miss What You Never Had" 9:22
8. "Haven't Seen For a While" 5:10
9. "Straight Curve" 6:45
10. "Rebecca" 12:23

== Personnel ==
- Pat McGee - Acoustic Guitar, electric guitar, vocals
- Al Walsh - Acoustic Guitar, Vocals
- John Small - Bass
- Chris Williams - drums
- Jonathan Williams - Organ, piano, Vocals
- Chardy McEwan - percussion
