= Jaret Reddick =

American musician (born 1972)

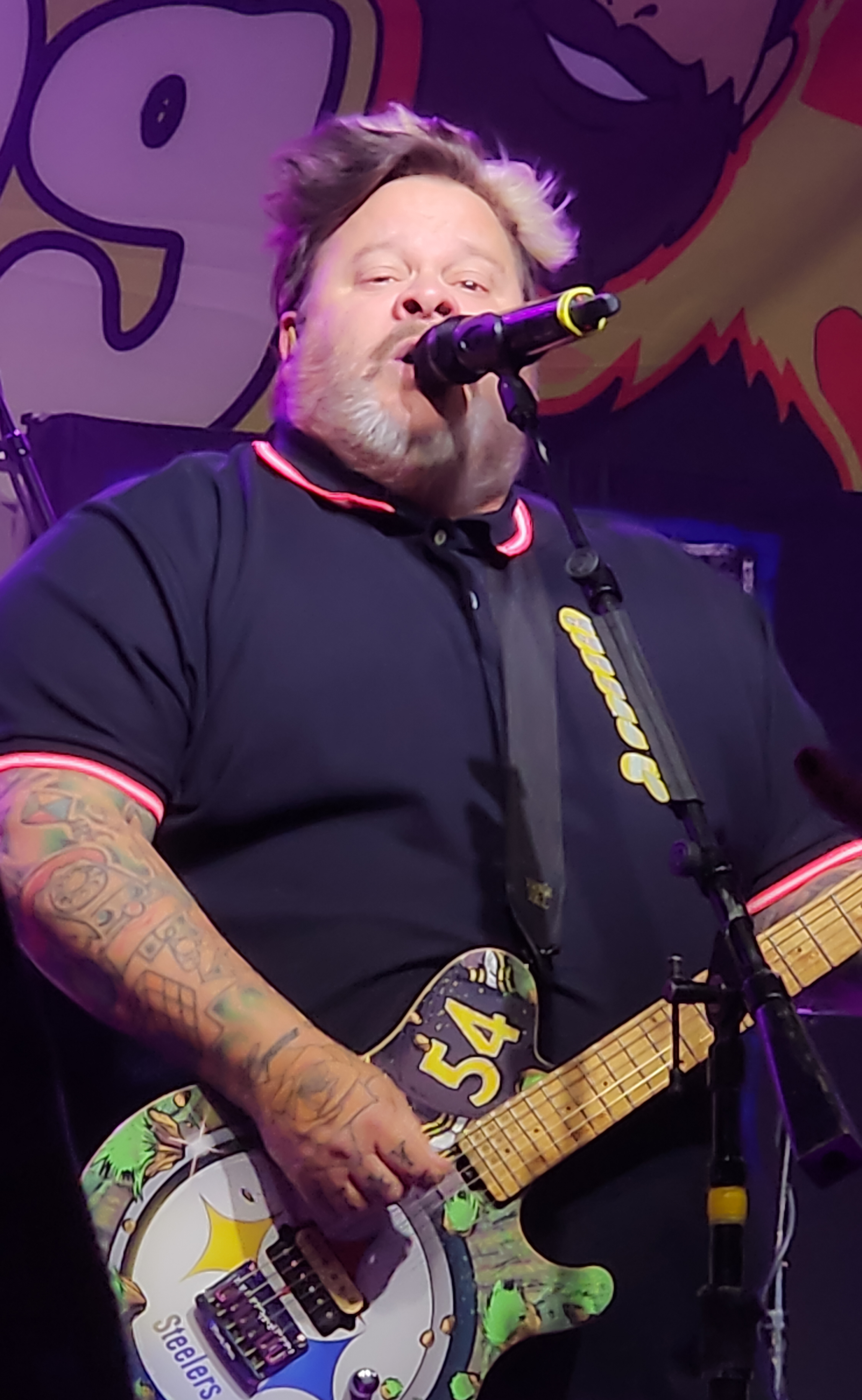
- Reddick performing with Bowling for Soup in 2023

Background information
- Also known as: J.R., Jaret Von Erich
- Born: Jaret Ray Reddick; March 6, 1972 (age 54); Grapevine, Texas, U.S.
- Genres: Pop-punk; alternative rock; power pop; punk rock; country
- Occupations: Singer; musician; songwriter; voice actor
- Instruments: Vocals; guitar
- Years active: 1985–present
- Member of: Bowling for Soup; Jarinus; Jaret and Kelly; Love Händel
- Formerly of: People on Vacation
- Website: bowlingforsoup.com

Jaret Ray Reddick (born March 6, 1972) is an American musician and voice actor. He is the lead vocalist, guitarist, and primary songwriter of the pop-punk band Bowling for Soup. He also voices Danny from Phineas and Ferb and has voiced Chuck E. Cheese since 2012.

== Early and personal life ==
Jaret Ray Reddick is the youngest of six children, with four sisters and a brother. He went to Cunningham Elementary School, Wichita Falls, Texas. He graduated from S. H. Rider High School in Wichita Falls. In high school, he played snare drum in the marching band, until age seventeen when he started playing guitar.

Reddick was diagnosed with ulcerative colitis when he was 19.

Reddick was previously married to Melissa Schaeffer; they divorced around 2007. They had 2 children. She died on October 23, 2026. In 2016, Reddick married hair stylist Casey Yant; they have one child together.

== Career ==
=== Bowling for Soup ===
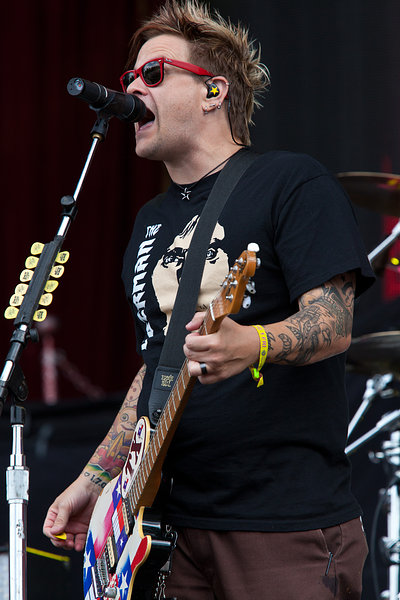
Jaret Reddick in 2010

Bowling for Soup formed in 1994 in Wichita Falls, Texas. Their name derives from the phrase "bowling for shit" from a comedy act by Steve Martin. Reddick is the songwriter for the band, penning such BFS hits as "Punk Rock 101", as well as playing guitar. After the departure of guitarist Chris Burney in 2025, Reddick is the only remaining original member.

His primary guitar is a Music Man Axis that has a Miller Lite design on it; his former primary guitar until 2018 was similarly a Music Man Axis with a flag of Texas design on it.

=== Phineas and Ferb ===
Reddick voices the lead singer of the fictional band Love Händel on the television show Phineas and Ferb. It started with Bowling for Soup providing the series' theme song "Today is Gonna Be a Great Day," (nominated for Outstanding Original Main Title Theme Music Emmy in 2008) and later Reddick's character Danny was introduced in the episode "Dude, We're Getting the Band Back Together". Reddick has since written several songs for the show and made a handful of appearances, both as Danny from Love Händel, and once with cartoon versions of the other members of Bowling for Soup performing "Today is Gonna Be a Great Day."

=== Sonic Unleashed ===
Reddick also worked with Sega for the song "Endless Possibility", which is featured as the theme to the Sonic the Hedgehog videogame, Sonic Unleashed. The song was written by Sonic game composer, Tomoya Ohtani.

=== Jarinus ===
Jarinus is a songwriting/production team composed of Reddick and Linus of Hollywood. The two have worked together co-writing songs and co-producing Bowling for Soup albums since Sorry for Partyin' (2009), as well as co-founding Crappy Records, and co-producing all of People on Vacation's releases. In late 2011, Jarinus announced that they would be making their debut album and that they would be seeking funding for recording it through Kickstarter, and have since reached their goal of over $18,000. The duo began releasing demo recordings as free downloads, as a "song of the week" promotion, on SoundCloud. However, Reddick later stated these songs would not appear on the album. The album, titled Rhymes with Vaginus, was released on March 26, 2013, with the only single, "Clear Your Browser History", being released prior on March 7.

On March 5, 2023, Jarinus released their first single in a decade, titled "Shit, Shower and Shave".

=== Crappy Records ===
Crappy Records is an independent record label started by Reddick and Linus of Hollywood as a partnership with Oglio Records. The label has released albums from Kurt Baker, The Leftovers, Linus of Hollywood, MC Lars, and Skyfox. The label has been largely inactive since 2012.

=== Built By Ninjas ===
Built By Ninjas is a music video production group formed by Reddick and Heath Balderston. The group has produced music videos for MC Lars, Patent Pending, Palmdale, and Skyfox, as well as Bowling for Soup's music video for the song "Turbulence" and People on Vacation's video for the song "Where Do We Go."

=== Producing Darlington singles ===
In 2008, Reddick produced, co-wrote, and co-arranged two singles with solo artist Christy Darlington. SUV & Girls + Summer = Fun! were subsequently recorded at Valve Studios with Reddick producing. Reddick also sung backing vocals and performed guitar parts on the songs, with Christy performing lead vocal parts and guitar parts. Erik Chandler performed the bass parts and also backing vocals, and Gary Wiseman performed the drum parts. These two singles were later released digitally. This collaboration was a result of Reddick & Bowling for Soup having known Darlington & performed concerts together in Dallas in the late 1990s, and a mutual liking and respect for each other's music.

=== People on Vacation ===
In 2010, Reddick started a side project band, called People on Vacation, with Ryan Hamilton from the indie rock band Smile Smile. The duo have since released two songs online. The first, "Better Off Dead" was released in late 2010, and a second, "She Was the Only One" was released in early 2011. A video for "Better Off Dead" has also been released. The duo released their debut EP, Carry On on November 24, 2011, through Brando Records. People on Vacation's debut album, The Summer and the Fall, was released a year later on November 22, 2012, with three tracks from Carry On being re-recorded for the album. In 2012, the Christmas release, Holiday Vacation, was released, being completely funded by fans on Kickstarter.

On February 3, 2015, the group's follow-up album, The Chronicles of Tim Powers, was released, this time being funded by fans on PledgeMusic. The Tim Powers of the title was one of those who pledged and helped fund the album's recording.

=== Chuck E. Cheese ===
In 2012, Chuck E. Cheese chose Reddick to be the new voice of their mascot, as part of a revamp for the character. He replaced Duncan Brannan in the role.

=== Jaret Goes to the Movies ===
In October 2015, Reddick started a podcast with family friend, Rich Coleman, called Jaret Goes to the Movies where they discuss a popular movie from their past each week. The show's cast was later expanded to include Reddick's wife, Casey Yant, as well as Eric Wade, Wil Vark and Sean Timothy. In 2016, the show was nominated for People's Choice Podcast Awards in the TV/Film category. The show ran regularly until July 2022, with Reddick announcing the show's end in February 2023.

=== Jaret Ray Reddick ===
Reddick released his debut country album, titled Just Woke Up, on March 11, 2022 through Brando Records, being produced by longtime collaborator Zac Maloy. Two tracks from the album made it to the top 30 on Texas and Red Dirt Radio, with the track "Royal Family" being in the top 20. Reddick received a TCMA nomination for "Emerging Artist of the Year" in 2023.

In 2024, Reddick announced plans for a second country album titled Already In Texas, releasing the single "Lone Stars" in February of that year. Originally slated for a May release, Reddick ended up announcing a delay for it instead that month. In June, the single "There Is You" was released, a song about mental health.

In September 2025, Reddick announced that the project would be put on hold, citing Bowling for Soup being busy again alongside his desire to focus on that, as well as family and voice acting, also stating he has "a bunch of [JRR] music recorded that I'll be sharing asap." The last Jaret Ray Reddick show for the time being took place on December 30, with Reddick opening for the Toadies.

=== Punk Rock Saves Lives ===
Reddick serves on the board of directors for Punk Rock Saves Lives, a nonprofit organization that supports bone marrow donor registration, mental health awareness, and harm reduction practices in the punk community.

== Discography ==
=== Jaret Ray Reddick ===
- Just Woke Up (2022)

=== Bowling for Soup ===
- Bowling for Soup (1994)
- Cell Mates (1996)
- Rock on Honorable Ones!! (1998)
- Tell Me When to Whoa (1998)
- Let's Do It for Johnny!! (2000)
- Drunk Enough to Dance (2002)
- A Hangover You Don't Deserve (2004)
- Bowling for Soup Goes to the Movies (2005)
- The Great Burrito Extortion Case (2006)
- Sorry for Partyin' (2009)
- Fishin' for Woos (2011)
- Lunch. Drunk. Love. (2013)
- Songs People Actually Liked (Vol 1) (2015)
- Drunk Dynasty (2016)
- Pop Drunk Snot Bread (2022)
- Don't Mind If We Do (2023)
- Songs People Actually Liked (Vol 2) (2023)

=== Phineas and Ferb and Love Händel ===
Year	Artist	Song	Release	Notes
2008	Danny and Phineas Flynn	"History of Rock"	Phineas and Ferb, episode: "Dude, We're Getting the Band Back Together"	Reddick as Danny from Love Händel and Vincent Martella as Phineas.
2008	Love Händel	"You Snuck Your Way Right Into My Heart"	Phineas and Ferb, episode: "Dude, We're Getting the Band Back Together"	Reddick as Danny from Love Händel.
2008	Love Händel	"Music Makes Us Better"	Phineas and Ferb, episode: "Dude, We're Getting the Band Back Together"	Reddick as Danny from Love Händel.
2009	Love Händel and Dr. Heinz Doofenshmirtz	"Couldn't Kick My Way Right Into Her Heart"	Phineas and Ferb, episode: "Thaddeus and Thor"	Reddick as Danny from Love Händel and Dan Povenmire as Doofenshmirtz.
2009	Love Händel	"You Snuck Your Way Right Into My Heart"	Phineas and Ferb soundtrack	Reddick as Danny from Love Händel.
2010	Love Händel	"Tri-State Area Unification Day"	Phineas and Ferb, episode: "Hip Hip Parade"	Reddick as Danny from Love Händel.
2010	Carmen Carter	"Izzy's Got the Frizzies"	Phineas and Ferb, episode "Robot Rodeo"	Songwriter
2010	Love Händel	"Bouncin' Around the World"	Phineas and Ferb, "Summer Belongs to You" episode and soundtrack	Reddick as Danny from Love Händel; also songwriter
2010	Love Händel	"The Ballad of Klimpaloon"	Phineas and Ferb, "Summer Belongs to You" soundtrack only	Reddick as Danny from Love Händel.
2010	Dan Povenmire, Jeff "Swampy" Marsh, Martin Olson, and Jaret Reddick	"Robot Riot" – Demo	Original demo written for Phineas and Ferb the Movie: Across the 2nd Dimension	Also songwriter
2010	Love Händel	"Santa Claus Is Coming to Town"	Phineas and Ferb: Holiday Favorites	Reddick as Danny from Love Händel.
2010–2011	Jaret Reddick	Take Two with Phineas and Ferb theme	Take Two with Phineas and Ferb	
2011	Love Händel	"Robot Riot"	Phineas and Ferb the Movie: Across the 2nd Dimension and soundtrack	Reddick as Danny from Love Händel; also songwriter
2025	Love Händel	"The Song of the Summer"	Phineas and Ferb, episode: "Cloudy With a Chance of Mom"	Reddick as Danny from Love Händel.

=== Jarinus ===
- Rhymes with Vaginus (2013)

Demo recordings released

- "18395" – 1:05
- "!@#$%" (Clean Version) – 1:14
- "The Day After Valentine's Day" – 1:40
- "Don't Be a Jerk" – 1:32
- "DVB" – 2:17
- "Farting at Staples" – 1:05
- "Happy Holidays Asshole" – 0:36
- "Happy New Year Asshole" – 1:12
- "It's Parry Gripp's Birthday!" – 0:38
- "Jarinus Kickstarter Theme" – 0:42
- "Jarinus Rhymes with Vaginus" – 1:30
- "Tweet for a Track" – 1:56

=== People on Vacation ===
- The Carry On EP (2011)
- The Summer and the Fall (2012)
- Holiday Vacation (2012)
- The Chronicles of Tim Powers (2015)

=== Jaret and Kelly ===
- Sittin' in a Tree (2019)

=== Other work ===
Year	Artist	Song	Release	Notes
2006	MC Lars feat. Jaret Reddick	"Download This Song"	The Graduate	
2006	Army of Freshmen feat. Jaret Reddick	"At the End of the Day"	Under the Radar	
2006	Army of Freshmen feat. Jaret Reddick	"Down at the Shore"	Under the Radar	
2006	Army of Freshmen feat. Jaret Reddick	"Maybe in the Midwest"	Under the Radar	
2006	Army of Freshmen feat. Jaret Reddick	"Wrinkle in Time"	Under the Radar	
2006	The Lordz feat. Jaret Reddick	"Runaway"	The Brooklyn Way	
2007	Junior feat. Jaret Reddick	"She's So Amazing"	Are We Famous Yet?	Also songwriter
2008	Jaret Reddick with various artists	"Endless Possibility"	Sonic Unleashed	Reddick performs lead vocals and wrote the song's lyrics. Erik Chandler of Bowling for Soup also sings during chorus.
2008	MC Lars feat. Jaret Reddick	"I'm Dreaming of a Green Christmas"	The Green Christmas EP	Also songwriter
2009	Darlington feat. Jaret Reddick	SUV & Girls + Summer = Fun!	produced, cowrote & coarranged the two singles, as well as performed guitar parts & backing vocals. Erik Chandler also performed bass parts & backing vocals & Gary Wiseman performed the drum parts.	
2009	RollerCoasteR feat. Jaret Reddick	"Ex Best Friend"	First Contact	
2011	Jaret Reddick	"Dallas 'til I Die"		Theme for FC Dallas
2011	Marti Dodson feat. Jaret Reddick	"Sonny and Cher"		Also producer
2013	Bret Michaels feat. Jaret Reddick	"What I Got"	Jammin' With Friends	
2013	Patent Pending feat. Jaret Reddick	"Classic You"	Brighter	Also Co-songwriter
2015	Suburban Legends	"Love Song"	Forever in the Friendzone	Co-songwriter
2020	Karma Kids	"Matrix"	Dystopian Dream Part Two: Land of the Free	Vocals
2020	Punk Rock Factory feat. Jaret Reddick	"Let It Go"	A Whole New Wurst	Vocals
2023	Chin Up, Kid	"1985 (feat. Jaret Reddick)"	1985 (feat. Jaret Reddick) - Single	Vocals
2023	Rival Town	"Seasons" feat. Jaret Reddick	"Seasons" feat. Jaret Reddick	Vocals
2024	Chin Up, Kid	"The Invitation (feat. Jaret Reddick)"	Blackheart Social	Vocals, Aleister Crowley speech
2024	Chin Up, Kid	"Flames (feat. Jaret Reddick)"	Blackheart Social	Vocals, Aleister Crowley speech

He also helped make and vocalize the song "His World" from the 2006 game Sonic the Hedgehog.

Films
Year	Title	Role	Notes
2002	Crossroads	As himself with Bowling for Soup	Uncredited
2005	Cursed	As himself with Bowling for Soup	Uncredited
2017	Saving the Tin Man	Daniel Kilgore	
Television series
Year	Title	Role	Notes
2003	Never Mind the Buzzcocks	Himself	Series 12, episode 8
2008–2013; 2025-present	Phineas and Ferb	Danny / Himself	3 episodes (Danny); 1 episode (Himself)
2011	Phineas and Ferb the Movie: Across the 2nd Dimension	Danny	TV movie
2023	Underdeveloped	Narrator	6 episodes
Other work
Year	Title	Role	Notes
2012–present	Chuck E. Cheese	Chuck E. Cheese	Animatronic stage show, commercials, and online content
