= Revel (album) =

Studio album by Pat McGee Band
- Released: 1997
- Recorded: unknown
- Genre: Rock
- Length: 47:20
- Label: Crossman Street, Inc.
- Producer: Pat McGee

Pat McGee Band chronology
From the Wood (1995)	Revel (1997)	General Admission (1998)

Professional ratings
Review scores
Source	Rating
Allmusic	link

Revel is the first official release by the Pat McGee Band, released in 1997.

== Track listing ==
1. "Passion" – 4:21
2. "Straight Curve" – 5:27
3. "Rebecca" – 4:46
4. "Flooding Both of Us" – 6:51
5. "Can't Miss What You Never Had" – 4:27
6. "All Around Us" – 6:23
7. "Ceamelodic" – 4:36
8. "On Your Way Out of Here" – 5:33
9. "Eligy for Amy" – 4:26

== Personnel ==
The Pat McGee Band

  - Pat McGee – lead vocals, guitars
  - Al Walsh – guitars, backup vocals
  - Jonathan Williams – piano, backup vocals
  - Chris Williams – drums
  - Chardy McEwan – percussion
  - John Small – bass
- Ira Gitlin – banjo
- J.C. Kuhl – saxophone
- Juli Murphy – backup vocals
- Gali Sanchez – percussion
