= From the Wood =

Studio album by Pat McGee Band
- Released: 1995
- Recorded: Pyramid Digital Productions, Falls Church, Virginia; Cue Studios, Falls Church, Virginia
- Genre: Rock
- Length: 39:46
- Label: Crossman Street, Inc.
- Producer: Pat McGee

Pat McGee Band chronology
From the Wood (1995)	Revel (1997)

Professional ratings
Review scores
Source	Rating
AllMusic	2/5 stars

From the Wood is the debut album of Pat McGee, who later formed the Pat McGee Band. It was released independently in 1995. There are two versions that exist, both containing 9 songs. The original release in spring of 1995 includes cover versions of Crosby, Stills & Nash's "Southern Cross" and the BoDeans' "Still the Night" as tracks 8 and 9.

== Track listing ==
1. "Girl From Athens" – 4:49
2. "Pride" – 4:01
3. "Rebecca" – 5:15
4. "Haven't Seen For a While" – 5:05
5. "Could Have Been a Song" – 4:10
6. "The Story" – 4:37
7. "Identity" – 3:25
8. "Nobody Knows" – 4:36
9. "Who Stole Her From Heaven" – 3:36

== Personnel ==
- Pat McGee – guitar, vocals, producer
- Hugh McGee – backing vocals
- Julie Murphy – backing vocals
- Mike Clem – bass
- John Small – bass
- Chris Bashista – drums, percussion
- Eddie Hartness – drums, percussion
- Travis Allison – piano
