= Smile Smile =

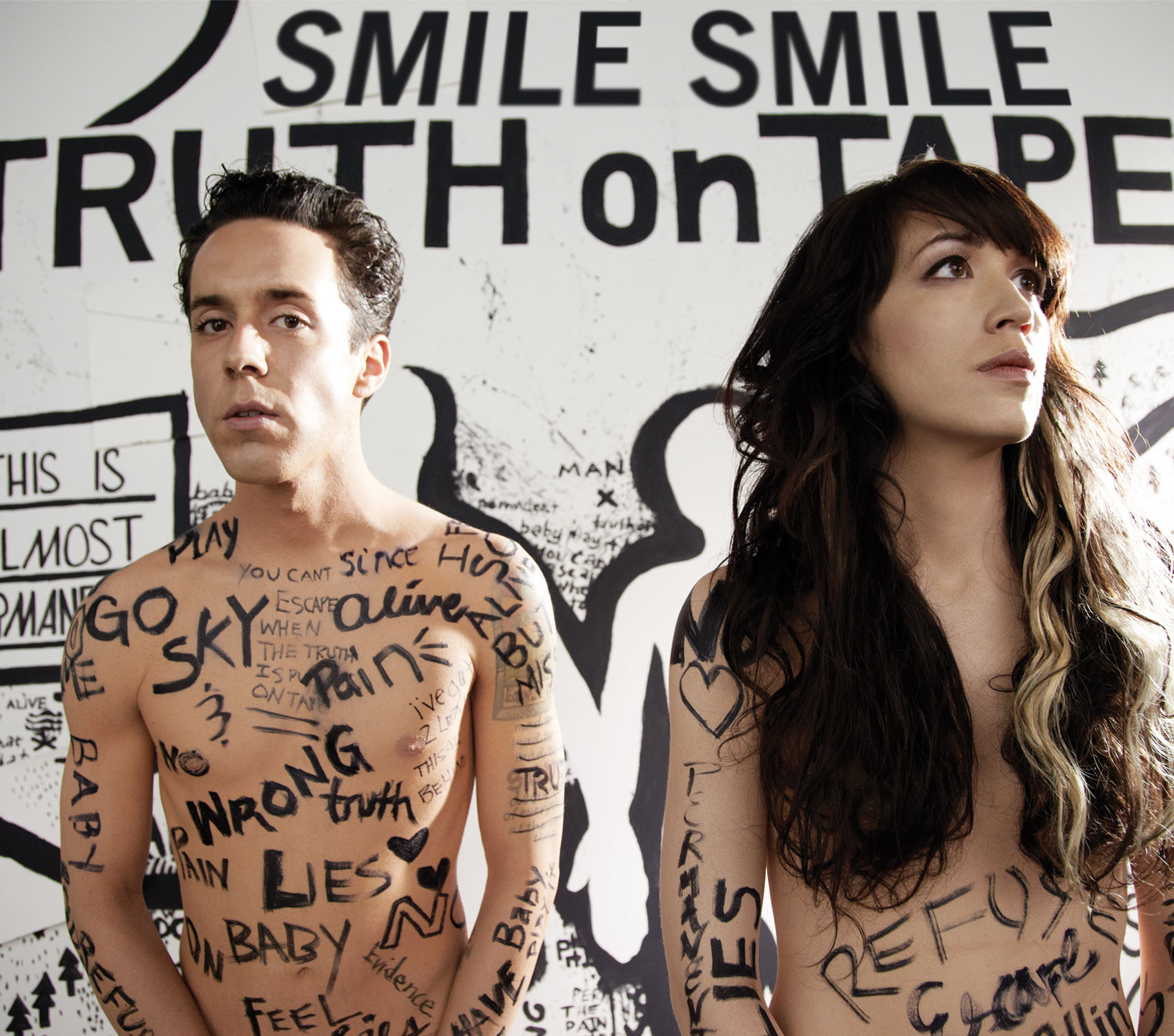
- The cover for Smile Smile's second album Truth on Tape.

Background information
- Origin: Dallas, Texas, United States
- Genres: Indie rock Indie pop Folk pop
- Years active: 2006–2013
- Label: Kirtland Records
- Members: Jencey Hirunrusme; Ryan Hamilton
- Website: Official website

Smile Smile was an American folk pop indie rock band based in Dallas, Texas. The band is made up of Jencey Hirunrusme (piano and vocals) and Ryan Hamilton (guitar and vocals). At various times Smile Smile has played with a variety of drummers including Jeff Gilroy (Red Monroe), Michael Ratliff (Calhoun, Odis) and Cooper Heffley (Little Black Dress).

== History ==
Their first full-length album, Blue Roses was originally self-released in 2006. Smile Smile was signed to Kirtland Records in 2008 and re-released Blue Roses under the label on May 6, 2008. "Sad Song", which was on Blue Roses was nominated for Best Folk Song in the Los Angeles Independent Music Awards and the band was nominated for Best USA Artist in the Toronto Independent Music Awards. Blue Roses was also licensed by MTV, with "Anymore" and "Stranger Across the Street" airing on NEXT in 2007 and 2008. "Anymore" was also licensed for use in Jack and Jill vs. the World, directed by Vanessa Paradis, starring Taryn Manning and Freddie Prinze Jr.

Hirunrusme has been a guest vocalist on albums by Calhoun, Black Tie Dynasty and Here Holy Spain. Hamilton has also been a guest vocalist on an album by Calhoun.

Their second studio album Truth on Tape was released in the United States on February 9, 2010. Truth on Tape was produced by David Castell. The title track "Truth on Tape" was mixed by Tim Palmer.

Ryan Hamilton has stated a new album titled His & Hers will be released in 2037 with Jencey Hirunrusme making her song writing debut for at least half the album, but in a 2015 Interview, he mentioned that the album was not coming and that he 'made' an interviewer write it down as a result of being in 'a bad place'.

Smile Smile released Their 3rd studio album "Marry a Stranger" August 2012.

In 2013 Smile Smile announced they were breaking up and did a farewell show on StageIt.

== Discography ==
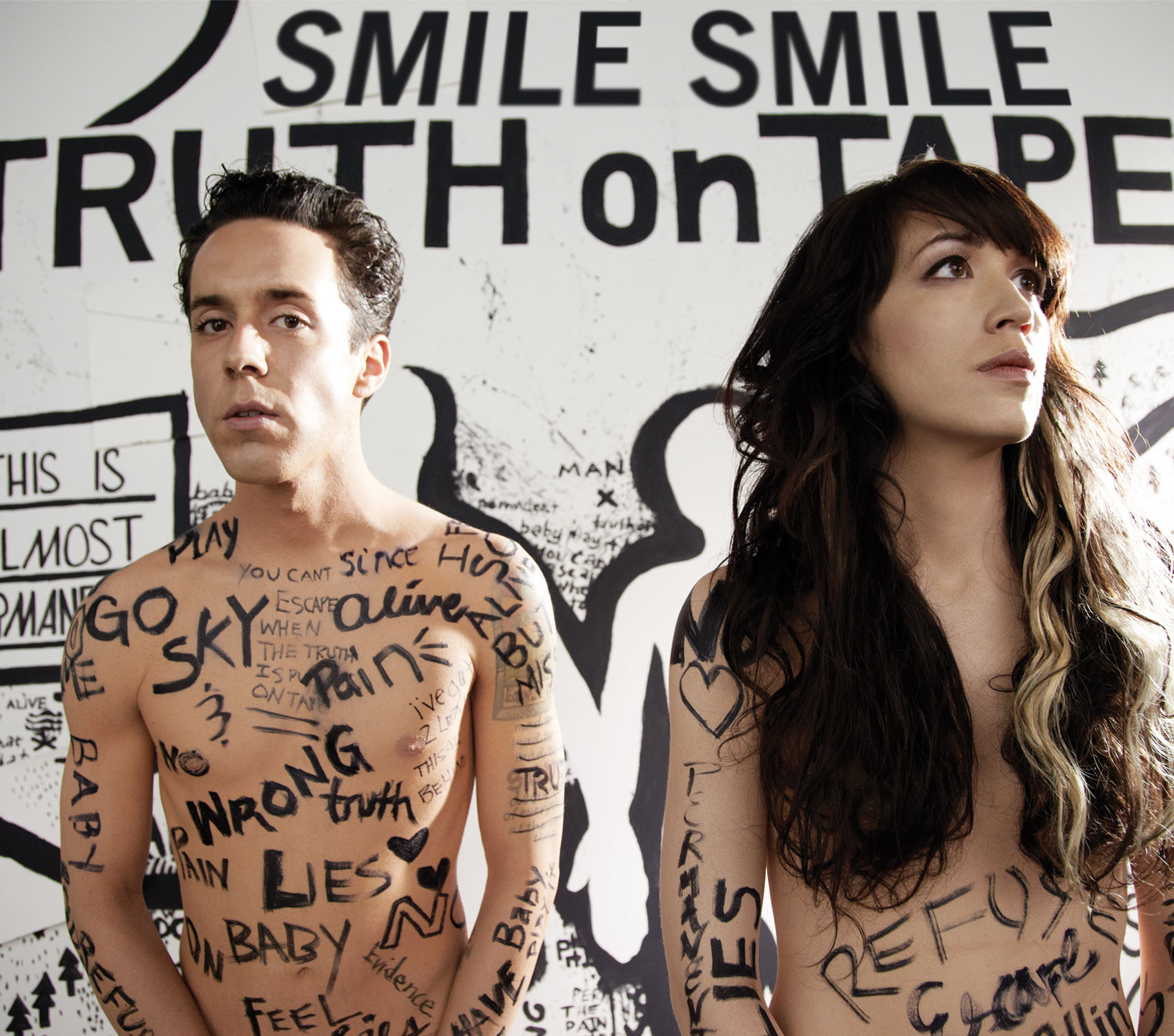
Smile Smile - Truth on Tape

=== Albums ===
Year	Details
2008	Blue Roses: Released: May 6, 2008; Label: Kirtland Records
2010	Truth on Tape: Released: February 9, 2010; Label: Kirtland Records
2012	Marry a Stranger: Released: August 2012; Label: Kirtland Records

=== Music Videos ===
Year	Title	Director	Album
2008	"Sad Song"	Andy Hines	Blue Roses
2010	"Tempo Bledsoe"	Travis Petty	Truth on Tape
2010	"Beg You to Stay"	Jason Whitbeck	Truth on Tape
2010	"Truth on Tape"	Jason Whitbeck	Truth on Tape

== Other projects ==
=== People on Vacation ===
Between 2010 and 2016, Hamilton worked on a side project band, called People on Vacation, with Jaret Reddick of the pop punk band Bowling for Soup.

=== Ryan Hamilton and The Harlequin Ghosts ===
After leaving the band People on Vacation, Ryan started a new project called Ryan Hamilton and the Traitors, later changing to Ryan Hamilton and the Harlequin Ghosts. 60s and ’70s influences form the foundation of Ryan Hamilton and The Harlequin Ghosts music.
