= Kirtland Records =

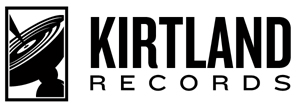
- Founded: 2003
- Founder: John Kirtland, Jenny Kirtland
- Distributor: The Orchard
- Genre: Rock
- Country of origin: United States
- Location: Dallas, Texas
- Official website: www.kirtlandrecords.com

Kirtland Records is a record label based in Dallas, Texas, with offices in Los Angeles, California and New York City. It was co-founded by Deep Blue Something drummer John Kirtland and his wife, Jenny Kirtland of The Polyphonic Spree.

== History ==
Kirtland Records was founded by John Kirtland, the drummer of alternative rock band Deep Blue Something. After the band broke apart, Kirtland went to work at Trauma Records, an Interscope-affiliated label which launched artists such as Bush and No Doubt. When Trauma Records founder Rob Kahane encountered financial difficulties, he borrowed money from Kirtland, offering as collateral the rights to the Bush back-catalog and royalty rights on the sales of the No Doubt album Tragic Kingdom. After Kahane defaulted on his debt, Kirtland sold the No Doubt royalty rights but kept the Bush back catalog rights.

In 2003, John Kirtland co-founded Kirtland Records with his wife, The Polyphonic Spree choir member Jenny Kirtland. Kirtland Records leveraged the Bush back catalog rights to secure a national distribution deal with RED Distribution (now merged into The Orchard), which remains the label's distributor. Kirtland Records went on to become the record label for a number of Texas-based indie bands, including the Burden Brothers, The Polyphonic Spree, Toadies, The Vanished, and Sarah Jaffe.

In 2014, Kirtland Records sold its Bush back catalog rights to Round Hill Music and Bush's frontman Gavin Rossdale. Kirtland Records also released Deep Blue Something's 2015 EP, Locust House.

== Artist roster ==
- Alpha Rev
- Burden Brothers
- Bush
- Bril
- Deep Blue Something
- The Fixx
- The Flys
- The Hourly Radio
- Sarah Jaffe
- Pat McGee Band
- People on Vacation
- The Polyphonic Spree
- Bob Schneider
- Smile Smile
- Toadies
- Space Cadet

== See also ==
- List of record labels
