= 2016 Bonnaroo Music Festival =

The 2016 Bonnaroo Music Festival was held June 9-12, 2016 in Manchester, Tennessee. This marked the 15th consecutive festival since its inception in 2002. Bonnaroo saw its lowest attendance to date in 2016 with 45,537 tickets sold—a 38 percent decrease from the previous year.

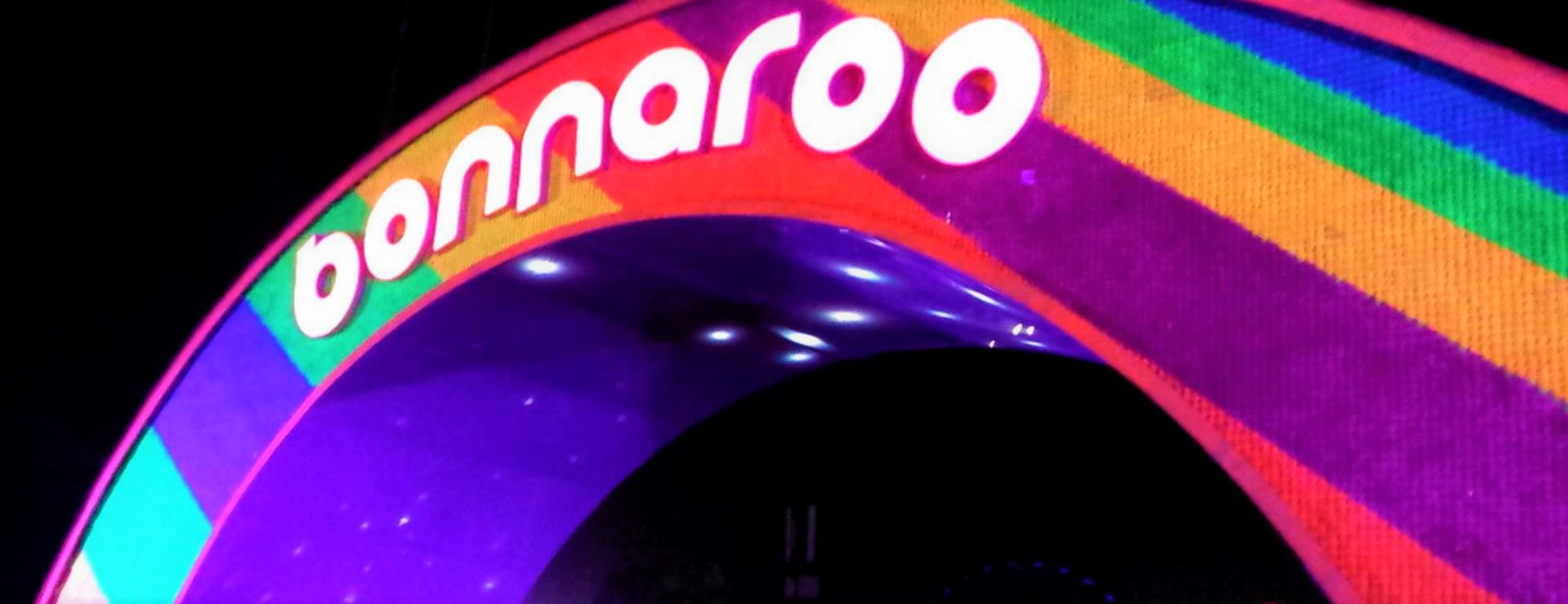
Main archway of Bonnaroo after the final set of 2016

The line-up was announced January 19, 2016 by American television host Conan O'Brien on his late night show Conan.

== Line-up ==
=== Thursday, June 9 ===
(Artists listed from earliest to latest set times)

- This Tent:
  - LANY
  - Waxahatchee
  - Bully
  - Twin Peaks
  - Børns
  - The Floozies
- That Tent:
  - Con Brio
  - The London Souls
  - Papadosio
  - Hermitude
  - Lizzo
  - Cashmere Cat
- The Other Tent
  - Roman Gianarthur
  - Lolawolf
  - Hundred Waters
  - Vulfpeck
  - Marian Hill
  - Goldlink
- Comedy Theatre presented by TBS
  - Joyelle Nicole
  - Aparna Nancherla
  - John Early
  - Rachel Feinstein
  - Nate Bargatze
  - Ian Abramson
  - Jon Gabrus
  - Bridget Everett
  - Piff the Magic Dragon
  - Josh Adam Meyers
  - Matteo Lane
  - John Early
  - Sean Patton
- New Music on Tap Lounge brewed by Miller Lite:
  - Roots of a Rebellion
  - Quaildogs
  - Lael Neale
  - Polyenso
  - Mail the Horse
- Communion Stage
  - Doe Paoro
  - Joseph
  - Hinds
  - Wet
- Silent Disco
  - Full Service Party
  - Quickie Mart
  - DJ Uncle Jesse
- Snake and Jake's Christmas Club Barn
  - Tiki Disco
  - New Breed Brass Band
  - Full Service Party
  - Gypsyphonik Disco

=== Friday, June 10 ===
- What Stage
  - Allen Stone
  - Misterwives
  - CHVRCHES
  - J. Cole
  - LCD Soundsystem
- Which Stage
  - Andra Day
  - St. Lucia
  - Griz
  - Halsey
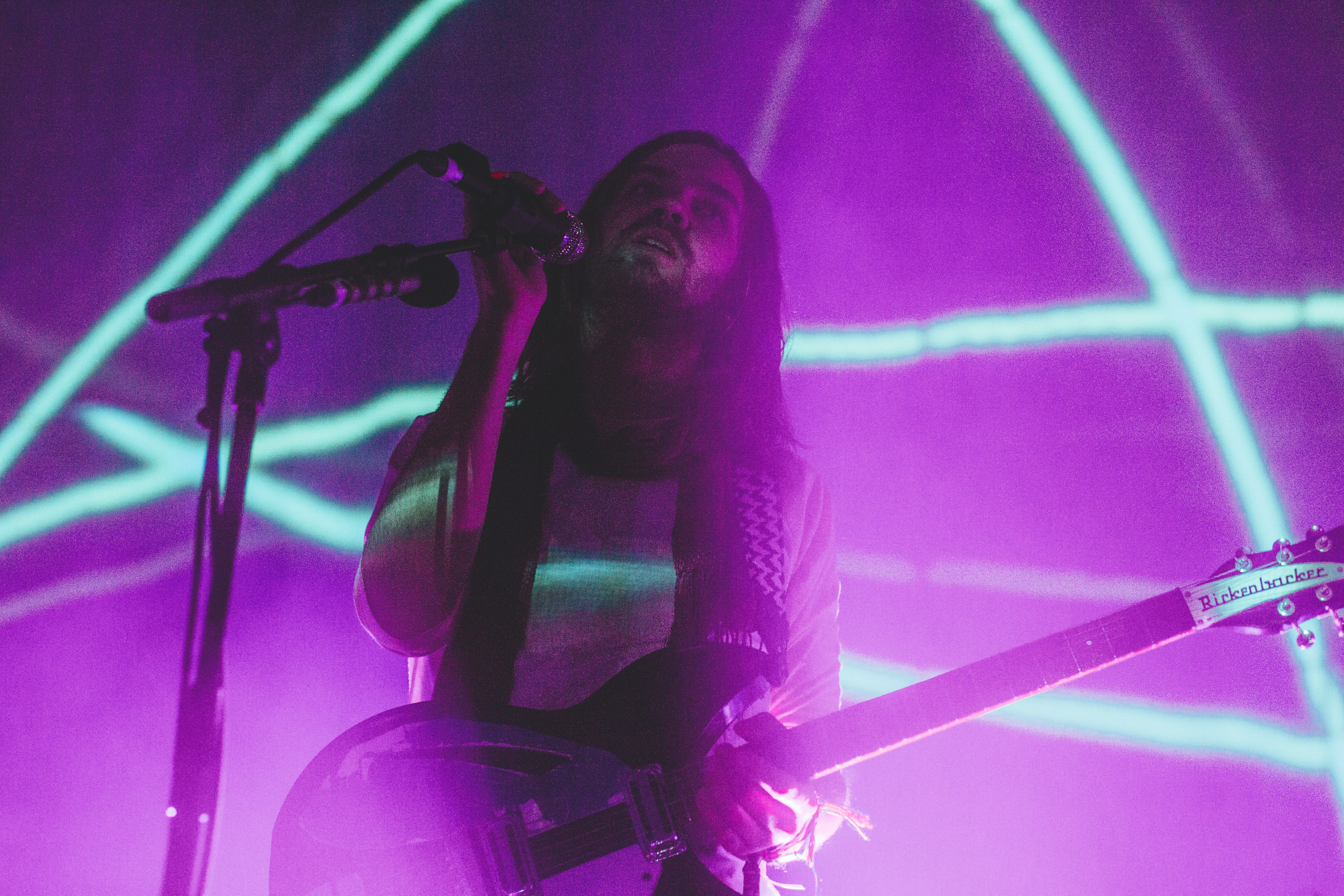
  - Kevin Parker of Tame Impala performing live
    M83
  - Tame Impala
- This Tent
  - Rayland Baxter
  - Ibeyi
  - Kamasi Washington
  - Vince Staples
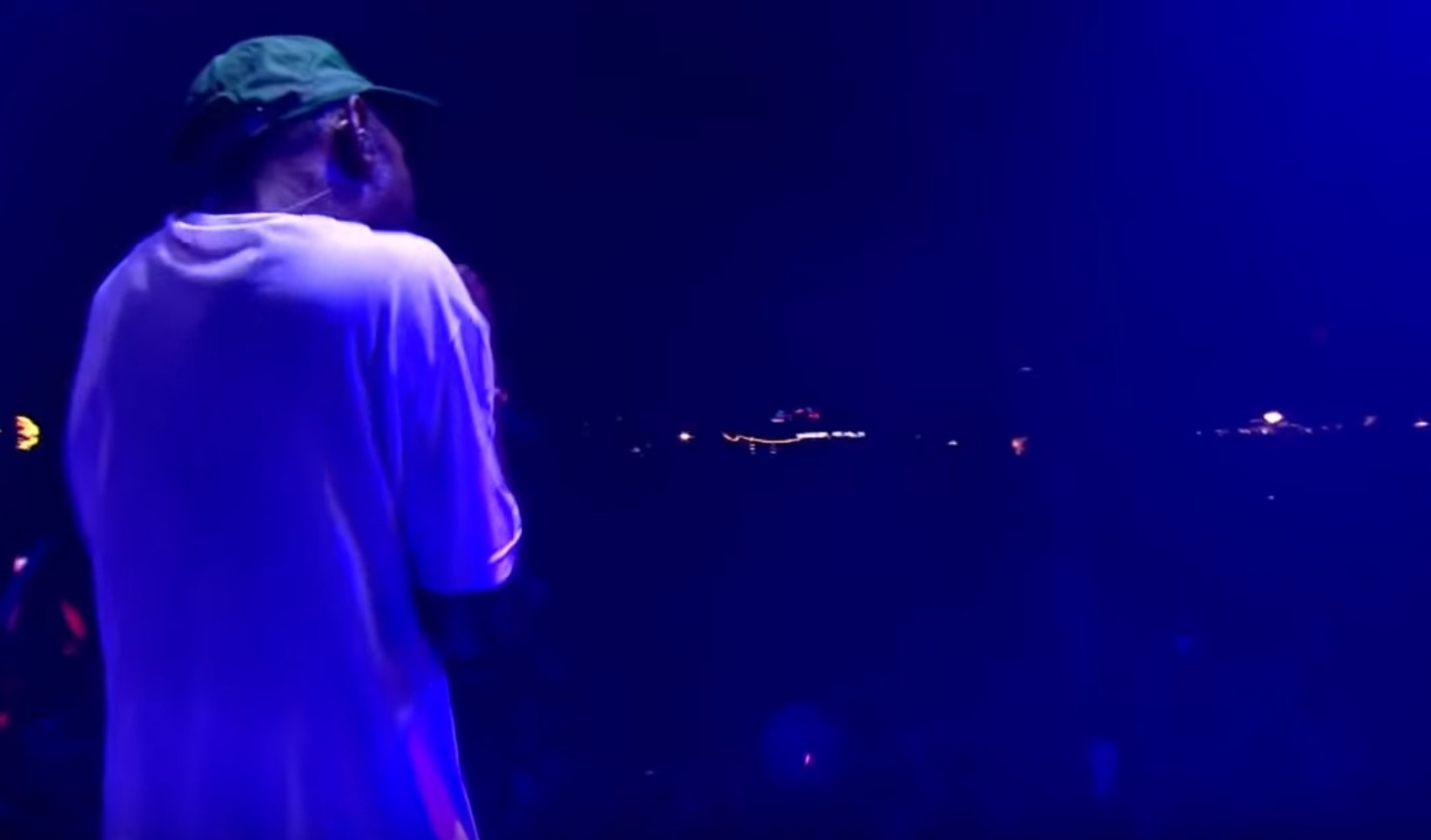
  - Tyler, the Creator performs at This Tent
    Tyler the Creator
  - The Chainsmokers
  - Zeds Dead
- That Tent
  - Jarryd James
  - Daughter
  - Fidlar
  - Keys N Krates
  - Flosstradamus
  - Bryson Tiller
  - Bob Moses
- The Other Tent
  - Dungen
  - Brett Dennen
  - Shamir
  - Lucius
  - Leon Bridges
  - Purity Ring
  - Blood Orange
- Comedy Theatre presented by TBS
  - Sam Jay
  - Alice Wetterlund
  - Jak Knight
  - Adam Ray
  - Bridget Everett
  - Piff the Magic Dragon
  - Josh Adam Meyers
  - Matteo Lane
  - John Early
- New Music on Tap Lounge brewed by Miller Lite
  - Stokeswood
  - Firekid
  - Luke Bell
  - Amanda Shires
  - Andrew Combs
  - Zach Heckendorf
- Who Stage
  - Henry Wagons
  - Mothers
  - Public Access TV
  - Whitney
  - Arkells
  - Holy White Hounds
  - Flux Capacitor
  - Powers
- Silent Disco
  - DJ Uncle Jesse
  - Tiki Disco
  - DJ Logic
  - DJ Prince Hakim
  - Quickie Mart
  - Lane 8
- Snake and Jake's Christmas Club Barn
  - Full Service Party
  - New Breed Brass Band
  - Stretch Armstrong
  - Tiki Disco
  - Tropical Party

=== Saturday, June 11 ===
- What Stage
  - Grace Potter
  - Chris Stapleton
  - Band of Horses
  - Macklemore and Ryan Lewis
  - Pearl Jam
- Which Stage
  - Chicano Batman
  - Judah and the Lion
  - Two Door Cinema Club
  - Haim
  - Ellie Goulding
- This Tent
  - Anderson East
  - The Internet
  - Steve Gunn
  - Nathaniel Rateliff and the Night Sweats
  - Sam Hunt
  - Superjam
- That Tent
  - Natalie Prass
  - Beach Fossils
  - Oh Wonder
  - The Claypool Lennon Delirium
  - Miguel
  - Big Grams (Big Boi + Phantogram)
- The Other Tent
  - Whilk and Misky
  - The Knocks
  - Post Malone
  - Clutch
  - Lamb of God
  - RL Grime
  - Adventure Club
- Comedy Theatre presented by TBS
  - Alice Wetterlund
  - Same Jay
  - Jak Knight
  - Adam Ray
  - Sean Patton
  - Josh Adam Meyers
  - Matteo Lane
  - Bridget Everett
  - Judd Apatow
  - Vanessa Bayer
  - Pete Davidson
  - Beth Stelling
  - Nate Bargatze
- New Music on Tap Lounge brewed by Miller Lite
  - Joe Hertler and the Rainbow Seekers
  - Lawrence
  - The Record Company
  - Grandma Sparrow
  - Isaac Gracie
  - Cardiknox
- Who Stage
  - Dylan LeBlanc
  - Margaret Glaspy
  - Amasa Hines
  - Grace Mitchell
  - Aubrie Sellers
  - Promised Land Sound
  - Sir the Baptist
- Silent Disco
  - E.Feld
  - DJ Logic
  - NSR
  - Jonathan Toubin
  - Red Bull Music Academy Takeover
- Snake and Jake's Christmas Club Barn
  - Full Service Party
  - Throwback Alt Rock Party
  - Robe Rage
  - 90's Rave

=== Sunday, June 12 ===
- What Stage
  - Charles Bradley and the Extraordinaires
  - Jason Isbell
  - Death Cab for Cutie
  - Dead and Company (2 sets)
- Which Stage
  - Cymande
  - Kurt Vile and the Violators
  - Father John Misty
  - Ween
- This Tent
  - Civil Twilight
  - Boy and Bear
  - Saint Motel
  - Lettuce
  - Lord Huron
- That Tent
  - John Moreland
  - Sara Watkins
  - The Wood Brothers
  - Steep Canyon Rangers
  - Sam Bush Band
  - The Bluegrass Situation Superjam featuring Ed Helms and Friends
- The Other Tent
  - Givers
  - The Oh Hellos
  - X Ambassadors
  - Third Eye Blind
- Comedy Theatre presented by TBS
  - Sam Jay
  - Alice Wetterlund
  - Jak Knight
  - Adam Ray
  - Adam Devine
  - Josh Rabinowitz
- New Music on Tap Lounge brewed by Miller Lite
  - The Pinklets
  - Korey Dane
  - Finish Ticket
  - Polly A.
- Who Stage
  - Austin Plaine
  - Sun Club
  - Maren Morris
  - Sunflower Bean
  - Swim Deep
  - DAWN
- Silent Disco
  - NSR
- Snake and Jake's Christmas Club Barn
  - Full Service Party
  - Classic Hip Hop Party
  - Dance Hall Reggae
