= Stretch Armstrong (disambiguation) =

Stretch Armstrong is a large, gel-filled action figure toy first introduced in 1976.

Stretch Armstrong may also refer to:

- Stretch Arm Strong, a hardcore punk band from Columbia, South Carolina
- Stretch Armstrong (ska band), a popular third-wave ska band from Provo, Utah in existence between 1990 and 1997
- DJ Stretch Armstrong, a New York-based DJ and music producer
