= Stretch Armstrong (band) =

Stretch Armstrong (band) may refer to:

- Stretch Arm Strong, a punk band from Columbia, South Carolina that was primarily active from 1992 to 2005
- Stretch Armstrong (ska band), a ska band based in Provo, Utah that was popular in the 1990s

== See also ==
- DJ Stretch Armstrong, a New York-based DJ and music producer
