= I'm Not Alone (disambiguation) =

"I'm Not Alone" is a 2009 song by Calvin Harris.

I'm Not Alone may also refer to:

- I'm Not Alone (album), a 2005 album by Keith Martin, or its title song
- I'm Not Alone (EP), a 2010 EP by Patent Pending, or its title song
- I'm Not Alone, an album by Mattie Moss Clark
- "I'm Not Alone", a song by Crystal Kay from Crystal Kay
- "I'm Not Alone", a song by Widespread Panic from Huntsville 1996
- "I'm Not Alone", a song by The David from Pebbles, Volume 9
- "I'm Not Alone", a song by Erik Segerstedt from A Different Shade
- "I'm Not Alone", a song by Disperse
- "I'm Not Alone", a song by character Carrie White from the musical Carrie
