= Claude Zdanow =

American business executive and musician

- Origin: Long Island, New York, U.S.
- Genres: Pop, hip hop, rhythm and blues, rock
- Occupations: CEO, Onar Holding Corporation; Former record producer
- Instruments: Guitar, bass, piano
- Years active: 2005–present
- Label: We Put Out Records
- Member of: Patent Pending (former)
- Website: Onar.com

Claude Zdanow is an American business executive, musician, composer, engineer, and entrepreneur. Active in the music industry since 2005, he toured with pop punk band Patent Pending as a bassist in 2006. He founded the Stadiumred Group (StadiumRed Inc.) in 2007. The first Stadiumred business was a recording studio company, Stadiumred Studios, home to engineers and producers that included Omen and Just Blaze, and worked on Grammy Award-winning projects, including Steven Mackey’s Dreamhouse (2010 Best Engineered Album, Classical).

Zdanow was CEO of Stadiumred, Inc. from 2007 to 2021, then became president of Integrum Worldwide, in 2022 and its CEO in 2023. After a reverse merger between Integrum Worldwide and publicly-traded Reliant Holdings, Inc., in 2024, Reliant named him their CEO on July 31, 2024, Reliant Holdings, Inc rebranded as Onar Holding Corp; it is publicly traded under the ticker "ONAR" on the OTCQB exchange. He joined the board of Endexx as of 2024, the board of Chemtech Holdings. Zdanow is also a periodic angel investor.

== Career ==
=== 1990s-2005: early years, RockIT Studios ===
Zdanow was born in the United States and raised in Long Island, New York. He began attending Portledge School in 1992, in Locust Valley, New York. By his teens, he was a songwriter and musician, learning instruments such as bass guitar, piano, and audio engineering.

While still attending high school, he founded RockIT Studios, at age 15. The one-person operation resulted from both his interest in music technology and his involvement with the music scene, as at the time he was writing, producing, and performing with several local bands. He constructed the small studio in his parents' basement in Long Island, officially opening in December 2005. Through RockIT he ended up working on several major-label projects, and among his clients were Evan and Jaron, The Dear Hunter, Warner Brothers, Maybelline Cosmetics and IMG Media.

=== 2006-2020s: Patent Pending, Stadiumred ===
After graduating high school from Portledge School in 2006, Zdanow moved to New York City to attend college, working in event promotions and as a composer for television. He was soon approached by the pop punk band Patent Pending. He joined as bass guitarist for their 2006 tour, touring the United States for five months, and sharing stages with bands such as Zebrahead, Catch-22 and Authority Zero.

Following the tour, in 2006, he returned to attend Marymount Manhattan College. While at Marymount he was involved in college radio and student government, while studying political science, philosophy, and business. He closed RockIT Studios in June 2007, founding his next studio, Stadiumred Studios, in Manhattan, a month later. He dropped out of Marymount in 2008, instead working full-time at his studio.

In Manhattan, Zdanow worked as a record producer and engineer for artists in genres such as EDM, hip hop, blues, R&B, and rock. He has also continued his work as a composer. He joined back up with Patent Pending for a single concert during the 2010 CMJ Music Marathon & Film: Stadiumred and ZS Events Showcase, to launch Stadiumred's event company, Stadiumred Life. In 2011, he mixed a project featuring Usher and Justin Bieber; produced by Mysto & Pizzi, the song was released on Ultra Records for the American Cancer Society. As of 2013, he also personally co-managed Jeremy Carr and The Chainsmokers.

==== Stadiumred Studios ====
Zdanow soon expanded the company from being a one-man operation to include, by early 2009, rock engineer Joseph Pedulla, hip-hop engineer Ariel Borujow and classical engineer Tom Lazarus. Staff video editors were also editing video for commercials. Sidney "Omen" Brown soon joined as a record producer as well. Inn February 2010, it was announced that Justin "Just Blaze" Smith was moving to Stadiumred Studios, after closing his own studio Baseline that month. By April 2011 the Stadiumred team included classical producer David Frost.

By 2010, Stadiumred Music was formed and developing, managing and recording both DJs and recording artists. Stadiumred Studios had also recorded music for the 20th Anniversary episode of The Simpsons. At that point clients had included Melinda Doolittle, Mos Def, Yo Yo Ma, and Thursday. Stadiumred Studios engineer Tom Lazarus mixed at Stadiumred Studios for Oliver Stone's film W, as well as for the San Francisco Symphony. The latter was filmed for Blu-ray and recorded live in San Francisco, then mixed at Stadiumred Studios. In 2011 Stadiumred Studios worked on The Greatest Story Never Told, the debut album by hip hop artist Saigon. The album was recorded, produced, mixed and mastered at Stadiumred Studios, and when released it reached No. 7 on Billboard's Hip Hop Albums Chart.

The company worked on four Grammy-winning projects in its first three years of operation, including a 2010 win for Best Instrumental Soloist Performance (without orchestra) for Journey to the New World by Sharon Isbin. In 2010 alone they were involved in eleven Grammy-nominated projects spanning nine categories, including Eminem’s Recovery (Album of the Year, Best Rap Album) produced and mixed by Just Blaze, Drake’s Thank Me Later (Best Rap Album, Best New Artist), and Steven Mackey’s Dreamhouse (Best Classical Album, Best Orchestral Performance, and Best Engineered Album, Classical). By 2010 the company had several dozen gold and platinum albums and several Oscars, Emmys and Tonys, and by 2014 Stadiumred Studios was associated with 30 Grammy nominations and 22 wins.

==== Stadiumred Group ====
In 2014, Stadiumred Group's website described it as a global marketing agency holding company. With Zdanow as CEO of the parent company, Stadiumred Inc. Stadiumred has owned and managed multiple other companies since inception, four of which are:

- Stadiumred Studios - recording studio company (ceased operations in 2015)
- Stadiumred Music - artist development company responsible for The Chainsmokers, Jeremy Carr, and others (became Music Publishing Company in 2014, a company focusing on content placement in film, television shows, trailers, etc.)
- Stadiumred Life - an experiential marketing agency focused medium to large companies across a range of sectors. Clients have included Pernod Ricard USA, Rolls-Royce, Anheuser-Busch, and others. (In 2018 merged with Werkshop Branding to create SevenBlue)
- Stadiumred Europe - a European business development company focused on helping European based companies in their expansion to the United States.

Under Zdanow, Stadiumred acquired Gyrosity Projects, a Nashville-based digital marketing agency, in June 2018. SevenBlue marketing agency resulted from the acquisition of Werkshop Branding in August 2018 and its merger with Stadiumred Life. MagicBullet Media was a marketing agency that Stadiumred acquired in November 2018.

In May 2020, he remained CEO of Stadiumred Group, with clients such as Revlon and Shiseido. In October 2020, Stadiumred Group ranked third on the annual Adweek 100 list for Fastest Growing Companies. At the time, the company was a collective of agencies, including Creative Riff, Gyrosity Projects, MagicBullet Media, Mediakix, and SevenBlue. Among clients were FX Networks, 7-Eleven, and Disney.

=== 2022-2025: CEO of Onar Holding Corporation, formerly Integrum and Reliant ===
In January 2021, he founded Wellsona Holdings. He was CEO of Stadiumred, Inc. from July 2007 to May 2021. In June 2021, Zdanow founded Claude Philippe Wines. He was named president of Integrum Worldwide in June 2022, with oversight of Integrum's two agencies, Storia and Chalk. He became Integrum's CEO in March 2023. Reliant Holdings, Inc., now Onar Holding Corporation, named him their CEO on July 31, 2024, after its reverse merger with Integrum.

== Boards and public speaking ==
In January 2024, Zdanow was named to the board of Endexx, with Zdanow also appointed Investor Communications Lead. By 2014, Zdanow was known as a periodic angel investor, and is an advisor and investor to Quirky and DJZ Inc., both tech companies. He was also an advisor for the Alzheimer's Disease Resource Center and a member of the Portledge Preparatory Arts Council.

In 2014, he was a member of various music industry organizations as well. A supporter of The Recording Academy, he was co-chair of the Grammy Camp Committee and, in 2013, was on the Grammy Camp panel at Pace University A frequent public speaker, he has appeared as an industry expert at events such as the 2011 Winter Music Conference, and has been invited to speak at the Organization of American States, Pro Audio Summit, Amsterdam Dance Event, Grammy-U, and ASCAP I Create Music Expo. In April 2014 he was an industry expert at Columbia Business School’s Startup Demo Night #23. He has also appeared in television shows and print publications such as Bloomberg TV, Rolling Stone, MarketWatch, and MSN.

== Discography ==
=== Notable releases ===
Albums and singles recorded, produced, or mixed at Stadiumred Studios:

- 2008: Stereo Skyline – EP by Stereo Skyline
- 2009: Attack of the Awesome!!! by Patent Pending
- 2009: Double Barrel by Marco Polo & Torae (mixed/mastered by Ricardo Gutierrez)
- 2009: Journey to the New World by Sharon Isbin
- 2010: "The Monster Demo" by Bebe Rexha (prod. by Frequency)
- 2010: Thank Me Later by Drake (mixing)
- 2010: Dreamhouse by Steven Mackey
- 2010: Recovery by Eminem (prod. by Just Blaze)
- 2011: Wildlife by La Dispute -nUS 200 #135
- 2011: "Price Tag" by Jessie J (recorded 2010)
- 2011: "She Ain't You" by Chris Brown
- 2011: Who You Are by Jessie J
- 2011: Second Family by Patent Pending
- 2011: The Greatest Story Never Told by Saigon (recorded, produced, mixed) - US Hip Hop #7
- 2011: For the Record by Torae (mastered by Ricardo Gutierrez)
- 2012: "Just One Breath" by Jeremy Carr (w/music video)
- 2012: Falling in Love by Red Cardell (mixed by Ariel Borujow)
- 2013: Born Sinner by J. Cole

=== Production credits ===
Selected production credits for Claude Zdanow
Yr	Release title	Artists	Notes, role
2006	The Worst Case Scenario	Stereo Skyline	Drums recording
2006	Act I: The Lake South, The River North	The Dear Hunter (Triple Crown Records)	Mixing
2009	"Stay With Me"	Karmatronic (Stadiumred)	Mixing

== See also ==
- List of record labels
