= Cropduster (disambiguation) =

A cropduster is a plane, or pilot, engaged in agricultural aerial application.

Cropduster may also refer to:

- Cropduster (band), an American alternative rock band
  - Cropduster (album), the band's debut album, 1998
- Cropduster (Adolescents album) from 2018
- "Cropduster", a song by Pearl Jam from Riot Act 2002
