= Drunk Uncle =

Drunk Uncle may refer to:

- Drunk Uncle (Saturday Night Live), a Saturday Night Live character
- Drunk Uncle (album), an album by Cropduster
