= Cropduster (band) =

American rock band

- Origin: Hoboken, New Jersey, U.S.
- Genres: Alternative rock
- Years active: 1994–2012
- Labels: We Put Out Records,
- Past members: Lee Estes; Tom Gerke; Scott Kopitskie; Marc Maurizi

Cropduster was an American alternative rock band from New Jersey.

== History ==
Cropduster was a four-piece alternative rock band from Hoboken, New Jersey. The name is derived from John Steinbeck's novel The Grapes of Wrath. They began playing live shows in North Jersey in the early 1990s, and released their debut self-titled album Cropduster in 1998. They achieved national recognition with their second album, entitled Drunk Uncle, which was released in 2001 by We Put Out Records. Comparing it to their first album, Allmusic reviewer Robert Hicks notes that Drunk Uncle "segue[s] from crunchy power pop and twangy country rock to distorted guitar sound effects and distinctive goofball eccentricity"

== Members ==
- Lee Estes – bass
- Tom Gerke – guitar and vocals
- Scott Kopitskie – drums
- Marc Maurizi – guitar and vocals

== Discography ==
Albums

- Cropduster (1998)
- Drunk Uncle (2001)

Appearing on

- Mint 400 Records Presents the Beach Boys Pet Sounds (2013)
- Patchwork (2014)
