= Neal Francis =

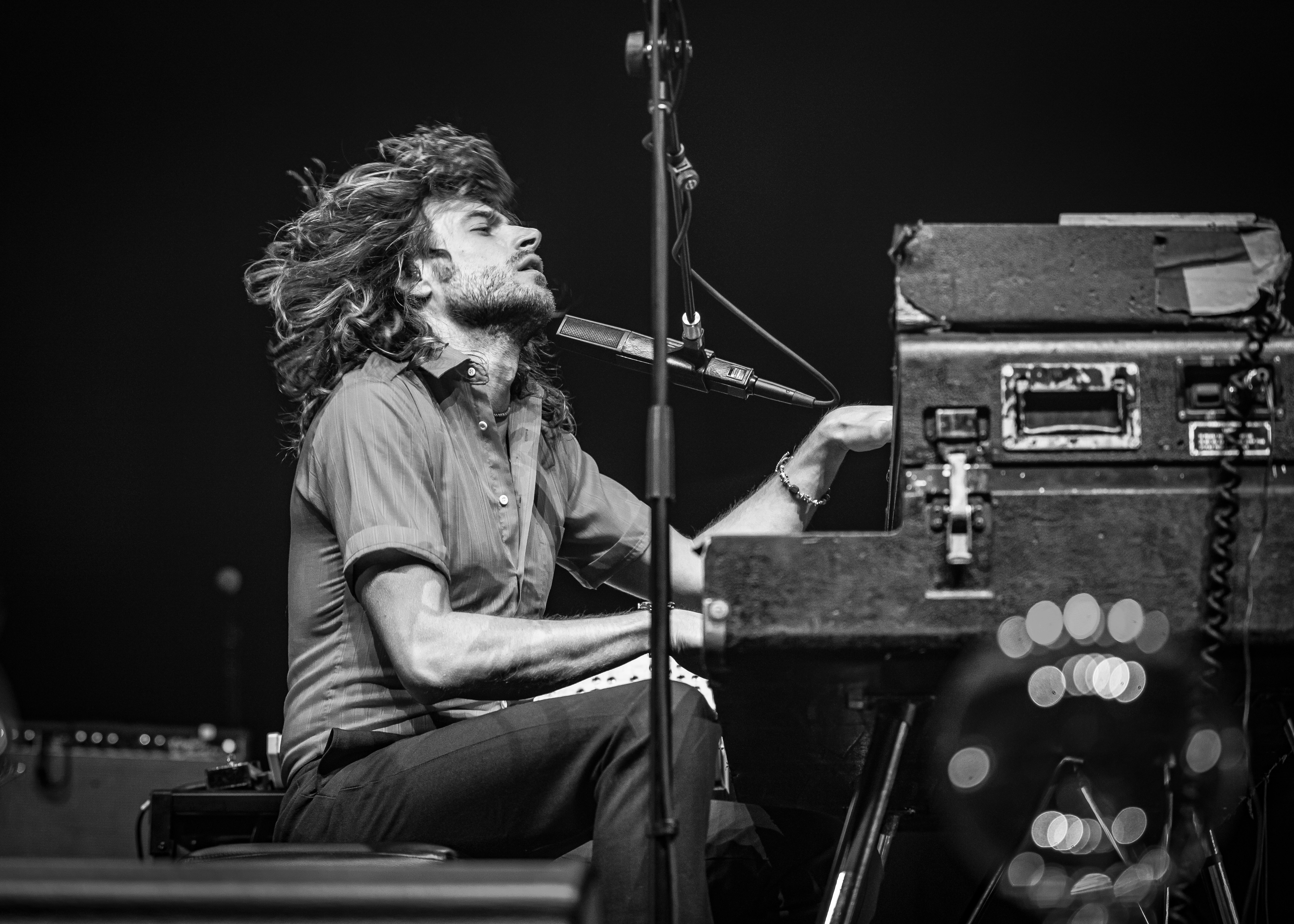
- Neal Francis in 2022

Background information
- Born: Neal Francis O'Hara; September 4, 1988 (age 38); Livingston, New Jersey, U.S.
- Genres: Psychedelic rock; rock; indie rock; R&B
- Occupations: Singer; songwriter; musician
- Instruments: Vocals; keyboards
- Years active: 2018–present
- Labels: ATO Records; Karma Chief Records
- Website: nealfrancis.com

Neal Francis (born Neal Francis O’Hara; September 4, 1988) is an American singer, songwriter, and pianist. Influenced by classic New Orleans artists such as Dr. John, the Meters, and Allen Toussaint, in addition to Sly Stone, Billy Preston, and Curtis Mayfield, he released his first album in 2019. His second album, In Plain Sight—a "revelatory blast of soul, R&B, and off-the-rails piano jams"—was released on ATO Records in 2021.

== Early life and education ==
Francis was born in Livingston, New Jersey and raised in Oak Park, Illinois, a suburb of Chicago where he began studying music at age four at The Language and Music School where he studied for ten years. He began playing the piano when he was a very young child, mimicking the sounds he heard on television. He started taking piano lessons with a classical teacher when he was four, and at 12, drawn to the blues, he began studying with boogie-woogie pianist Erwin Helfer. He played in his first band, the Reverend Funk Connection, in high school, and as a teenager sat in with blues artists at Chicago clubs. He briefly attended the University of Illinois at Chicago, where he studied architecture.

== Career ==
=== Mud Morganfield, The Heard, Changes ===
After graduating from high school, Francis played live dates with prominent blues artists including singer Mud Morganfield, the oldest son of Muddy Waters. In 2012, he joined The Heard, an instrumental funk band, and became the band's primary songwriter. A heavy drinker, and "addicted to everything", Francis was kicked out of the band in 2015. After getting sober he decided to go solo.

In 2017, with bassist Mike Starr and drummer PJ Howard from The Heard, Francis began recording his first album, Changes, at producer Sergio Rios' Killion Studios in Los Angeles. In a blog post, he wrote: “Drinking held my music in a half-cocked slingshot. I was always so consumed by drugs and alcohol that I didn’t have the time, money, or creative energy to do it. Sobriety let it loose." In February 2018, with the basic tracks finished, Francis signed with Karma Chief Records, a subsidiary of Colemine Records. He spent the following months doing overdubs in Chicago with engineer Mike Novak. (Novak also recorded demos for the project, which were released as Changes (Demos) in 2021.)

Changes was released in September 2019. It received significant praise from music critics, and made Album of the Year lists at radio stations including KEXP, KCRW, KDHX, WYCE, and KVOQ.

=== In Plain Sight, Sentimental Garbage, Francis Comes Alive, Return To Zero ===
While touring in support of Changes, Francis and his longtime girlfriend broke up. When he returned to Chicago he moved into St. Peter's United Church of Christ, where he had once worked as a music minister. He said that a combination of sleep deprivation and emotional exhaustion emboldened him to ask if he could stay at the parsonage.

Francis signed with ATO Records in 2020. He began working on his second album, In Plain Sight, during the first lockdown of the COVID-19 pandemic. The album was recorded in a full studio attached to the parsonage that Francis built with his bandmates. Collaborating once again with Rios, In Plain Sight was recorded entirely on analog tape in a full recording studio using several analog tape machines (including a TASCAM 388 and TASCAM MS-16). The band recorded the album with Rios between September and December 2020; overdubs were completed in January 2021. Grammy Award winner Dave Fridmann mixed the album later that spring.

The album's first single, "Can't Stop the Rain" (featuring Derek Trucks on slide guitar), was released on August 17, 2021. It was followed by "Alameda Apartments", "Prometheus" and "Problems." The album debuted on November 5, 2021.

In Plain Sight was praised by, among other media outlets, KCRW ("an unapologetically joyful, electric feel that makes for just the jolt to the system we needed"), Rolling Stone (“Francis captures a sound that's somewhere between Elton John and Little Feat”), and Uproxx (“lovers of Dr. John, Leon Russell, and The Meters will immediately feel at home amid Francis’ fat-bottomed, bluesy bangers”).

The first radio single from In Plain Sight was "Can't Stop The Rain." It was the most added song on Adult Alternative Radio the week it debuted. It also spent 26 weeks on the Americana chart.

In November 2022, Francis released the EP Sentimental Garbage. It included songs recorded during the original album sessions for In Plain Sight at St. Peter's, as well as cover songs recorded for the online music blog Aquarium Drunkard. Sentimental Garbage was the working title for In Plain Sight.

In October 2023, Francis released a 12" single on Chicago's Star Creature record label with a remix from Derrick Carter. Carter's remix of BNYLV is on the A Side with an instrumental version on the B-Side.

In November 2023, Francis released a live album entitled Francis Comes Alive. Recorded to analog tape over two sold-out shows at Chicago's Thalia Hall in March 2023, the live album contained twelve songs spanning Francis' catalog. Francis supplemented his touring quartet with an additional seven band members (horns, backup singers, percussion, and auxiliary keyboards). The live release was accompanied by a concert film directed by Alec Basse.

Return To Zero, Francis' third album, was released on March 14, 2025. Rolling Stone wrote that the album was "a sonic kaleidoscope of soaring funk, seductive soul and undulating rock." The album was produced by Sergio Rios. Francis appeared on Jimmy Kimmel Live! and performed "What's Left of Me."

== Discography ==
- Changes (2019)
- "Don't Call Me No More" / "How Have I Lived (Reprise)" (2020)
- Changes (Demos) EP (2021)
- In Plain Sight (2021)
- Sentimental Garbage EP (2022)
- BNYLV 12" (Derrick Carter Remix)(2023)
- Francis Comes Alive (2023)
- Return to Zero (2025)

=== Singles ===
Title	Year	Peak chart positions	Album
Title	Year	US AAA	Album
"Can't Stop The Rain"	2021	24	In Plain Sight
"Problems"	2022	25	In Plain Sight
"What's Left of Me"	2025	28	Return to Zero
