= Patent Pending (band) =

American rock band

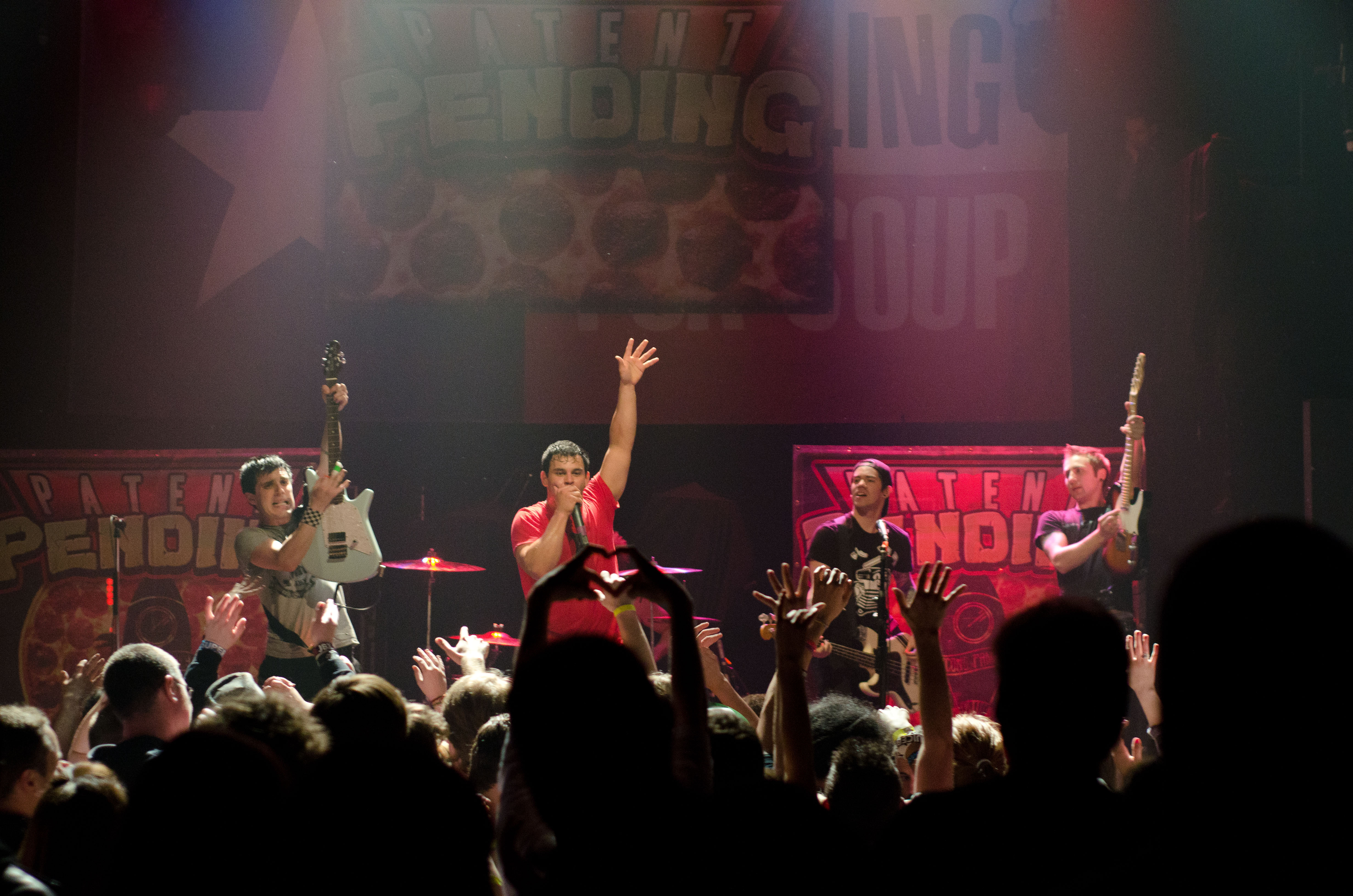
- Patent Pending performing in 2012

Background information
- Also known as: P-Unit, PTPG, Mario and the Brick Breakers
- Origin: Mount Sinai, New York, U.S.
- Genres: Pop-punk; power pop; alternative rock; ska punk
- Years active: 2001–present
- Labels: We Put Out; Crappy; Second Family; Rude
- Members: Joe Ragosta; Anthony Mingoia; Robert Ragosta; Nick Zinnanti; Corey DeVincenzo
- Past members: Michael Ragosta; Drew Buffardi; Jay Beiner; Travis McGee; Claude Zdanow; Marc Kantor; Rob Felicetti
- Website: patentpendingmusic.com

Patent Pending is an American rock band formed in Mount Sinai, New York, in 2001.

Consisting of Joe Ragosta (vocals), Anthony Mingoia (drums), Robert Ragosta (guitar), Nick Zinnanti (guitar), and Corey DeVincenzo (bass), the band had self-released various EPs before releasing its debut album, Save Each Other, the Whales Are Doing Fine, in 2006 with original vocalist Michael Ragosta, and bassist Drew Buffardi on We Put Out Records. In 2009 Patent Pending released an EP, Attack of the Awesome!!!, with Joe Ragosta and Michael Ragosta switching on lead vocals, and Jay Beiner on bass guitar. Michael Ragosta left the band shortly after the EP's release, with lead vocal duties permanently replaced by Joe Ragosta. Joshua Dicker, long time collaborating songwriter with the band, would appear as a live guitarist consistently during Joe Ragosta's switch to lead singer. Former The Ataris guitarist Rob Felicetti joined the band in 2010 until leaving in 2021, having joined Bowling For Soup in 2018.

Patent Pending released an EP, I'm Not Alone, in 2010, and the group's second album, Second Family, in 2011, and performed the single "Dance Til We Die" live at the 2012 Billboard Music Awards, hosted at the MGM Grand Garden Arena in Las Vegas, Nevada.

The band released its third album, Brighter, in 2013. The band announced its signing with independent record label Rude Records for the release of Armageddon EP, due to release in July 2015. In November 2015 the band released their first LP of their Rude Records contract, Riot Hearts Rebellion.

The band is notable for its upbeat demeanor, diverse song subjects, close relationship with its fans, and energetic live shows. Since the group's formation, Patent Pending has released three full-length albums, ten extended plays, and ten singles to date.

== History ==
=== Formation (2001) ===
Patent Pending was formed in 2001 by Joe Ragosta and Drew Buffardi while the two were attending Mount Sinai High School in Mount Sinai, New York. The band was started hastily in order to perform at a local open mic night Ragosta and Buffardi had heard about, recruiting Joe's younger brother Michael on lead vocals, and approaching Anthony Mingoia as he was the only drummer they knew of in their school. Patent Pending began to play shows around Long Island, gaining a consistent following in Nassau County, while the band hailed from adjacent Suffolk County. The group began recording demo CDs with some songs that would go on to be re-recorded and re-released on the band's future albums.

=== Early releases and Save Each Other, the Whales Are Doing Fine (2001–2006) ===
The band release its debut EP, Meet the Fat Kids, in 2001, which was self-released and contained only 2 songs. The same year the band release the full-length EP, The Pirate House, which featured both songs from the group's previous EP on it. The name of the EP is a reference to a house decorated like a pirate ship in the band members' home town. Patent Pending released two more EPs in 2002, Air Drew and Drive By, and second full-length EP, Don't Quit Your Day Job.

Later in 2004 the band released the EP, ...Is Your Biological Father, filming the group's first music video for the song "The June Spirit". In 2005 Patent Pending signed to the record label, We Put Out Records, under the East/West Record Group. The following year the group released its debut full-length album, Save Each Other, the Whales Are Doing Fine, on We Put Out Records, and produced by Joseph A. Pedulla. The album's original title, "Save The Children, The Whales Are Doing Fine", spawned legal issues pursued by the Save the Children Foundation, causing the album to be retitled and the original release date of May 9, 2006, was changed to June 6, 2006. The album achieved moderate commercial success, selling over 10,000 copies due to the band's inclusion on the entire 2006 Vans Warped Tour, and supporting Gym Class Heroes and Cobra Starship on a tour immediately following. Upon completing the record, the band invited long-time friend Marc Kantor to join as an additional guitarist.

=== Attack of the Awesome!!!, I'm Not Alone, and switching singers (2007–2010) ===
Bassist and founding member Drew Buffardi left the band in 2007, and was replaced by Jay Beiner who joined as a full-time replacement. The band performed at the 2007 Bamboozle Festival in East Rutherford, New Jersey, as well as select dates on the 2007 Vans Warped Tour, in addition to touring smaller clubs and venues throughout the United States. On April 16, 2007, guitarist Marc Kantor began riding his bicycle from Levittown, New York to San Diego, California in an effort to help raise money and awareness for the American Heart Association, with a portion of the proceeds also being donated to the Rhiannon Chloe Foundation, and was successfully completed on June 7, 2007. The band embarked on a Northeastern and Midwestern tour in January 2009 with Just Surrender. They later performed at The Bamboozle festival. Patent Pending went back into the studio with Joseph A. Pedulla to record Attack of the Awesome!!!, an eight-song EP featuring Joe Ragosta and Michael Ragosta switching lead vocal duties, and was released July 14, 2009. The band supported the EP on separate tours with Catch 22, Just Surrender, and Suburban Legends throughout the first half of the year.

After a performance at the Crazy Donkey in Farmingdale, New York on July 25, 2009, Michael Ragosta announced his departure from the band via a YouTube video of he and Joe offering an explanation for his leaving the band. Joe Ragosta, originally a guitarist and backing vocalist, became the band's permanent lead vocalist. Long time songwriter and collaborator with the band, Joshua Dicker, took over Joe Ragosta's guitar duties for live performances during this time. Dicker and Ragosta began writing for a new EP, asking long time friend and former The Ataris guitarist Rob Felicetti to come track guitar for the record. In March 2010, the band went to record with producer Jordan Schmidt, who had worked with other pop rock artists such Motion City Soundtrack and All Time Low, at Melmac Studio in Minneapolis, Minnesota. The recordings produced the EP/DVD, I'm Not Alone, which was released August 17, 2010, featuring a double disc set featuring a 6-song EP, and a DVD featuring live performance footage, tour stories, and a band biography. Felicetti became Dicker's touring replacement, and eventually joined the band as a full-time replacement during the group's 2010 summer tour. Patent Pending began writing for another record throughout the fall and winter of 2010, following the departure of bassist Jay Beiner, and the inclusion of fill-in bass player Travis McGee.

=== Second Family and 2012 Billboard Music Awards performance (2011–2012) ===
In February 2011, the band joined back up with producer Jordan Schmidt to begin pre-production for a new full-length record. They started recording at StadiumRed in Harlem, New York during March, and finished up the recording process at Schmidt's Melmac Studio in Minneapolis, Minnesota. Patent Pending self-released its second full-length album, Second Family, on July 12, 2011. While in the studio, the band released two music videos for singles from the EP I'm Not Alone: one for "One Less Heart to Break" which reached number one under every category on mtv.com and put into rotation on MTV2), and "Dance Til We Die" which reached the twelfth highest rated and most viewed music video on mtv.com.

In May, the band was asked to support a US tour with Bowling for Soup and The Dollyrots, and spent the summer on the Vans Warped Tour following McGee joining the band as a full-time bassist. In October, the band filmed a music video for the single "Douchebag" with producer/director Jaret Reddick of Bowling For Soup's music video production company Built by Ninjas, which was released December 6, 2011.

Patent Pending was originally scheduled to play on May 20 at The 2012 Bamboozle Festival in Asbury Park, New Jersey following a spring touring schedule supporting Bowling For Soup, however on May 18 the band was named Billboard's "Dreamseaker Artist of the Year" after winning a battle of the bands competition at the Joint at the Hard Rock Hotel & Casino in Las Vegas, Nevada, securing a live performance slot at the 2012 Billboard Music Awards on ABC. The band was replaced by This Good Robot for its May 20 performance at Bamboozle Festival. Patent Pending played select dates on the 2012 Vans Warped Tour over the summer on the Ourstage.com Stage from July 6–12 and July 21, as well as supporting on a subsequent tour with the Red Jumpsuit Apparatus. The band was also included on the Crappy Records compilation Have a Crappy Summer, on which they released a new song, "These Pools Were Made for Hopping".

In 2012, fill-in bassist Travis McGee was replaced by full-time permanent band member Corey DeVincenzo. That October, Patent Pending embarked on a two-week tour of the United Kingdom supporting Bowling for Soup, which were the band's first shows outside of North America. In addition to the tour, Bowling for Soup released a split album with the supporting acts of the group, Patent Pending and The Dollyrots, on the band's "One Big Happy Tour." The split was called Bowling for Soup Presents: One Big Happy!, with each releasing a new original song and a cover of a song by the other bands on the album. The band's new original song on the split was "Psycho In Love", and the band covered Bowling for Soup's "Shut Up and Smile" and The Dollyrots' "Hyperactive."

In December 2012, Patent Pending released a five-track digital cover EP called Spring Break '99, which included covers of Limp Bizkit, Smash Mouth, Lit, The Backstreet Boys and Sugar Ray. This was followed with a holiday tour in December 2012, and the group's first headlining tour of the United Kingdom in April, alongside a performance at the 2013 Download Festival in Leicestershire, England.

=== Brighter (2013) ===
In February 2013, the band began production on a new record at Fantasy Land Studio in Gallatin, Tennessee, choosing again producer Jordan Schmidt, and was fan funded by a campaign on PledgeMusic. The band released its third full-length album, Brighter, on October 7, 2013. The US release took place one day later. The album included 12 tracks, one being a bonus track titled "Spin Me Around". The same year Patent Pending opened for Bowling for Soup during the group's farewell tour in the United Kingdom.

=== Mario and the Brick Breakers (2014) ===
In July 2014, Patent Pending released a digital download EP called Patent Pending Presents Mario and the Brick Breakers: Greatest Hits featuring the song "Hey Mario" and five other tracks. The project was inspired by the Mario video game franchise and featured Patent Pending in-character as the fictional group. The release was supported by the band playing as Mario and the Brick Breakers during the group's late 2014 concerts, either as a spoof support act or during Patent Pending's set. A full length mockumentary was released on September 11, 2014. The EP was released on CD in October 2014 and in Australia as a double CD set with Brighter in early 2015.

The project received favorable coverage from Kotaku for the mockumentary's re-imagining of Nintendo characters as musicians. It received unfavorable coverage from the AV Club for the unauthorized use of Nintendo IP for a novelty song driven act and the lyrics of "Hey Mario".

=== Armageddon (2015) ===
On July 31, 2015, Patent Pending released another digital download EP called Armageddon featuring the song "Brighter", and four other brand new songs; "Too Much to Think", "The Way I See It", "Tick Tick Boom" and "We're Getting Weird".

=== Riot Hearts Rebellion (2015) ===
On October 26, 2015, Patent Pending announced their fifth studio album, Riot Hearts Rebellion, releasing the track listing, album art, and video for the single "NSFW (.)(.)". The album was released on November 27, 2015. In November and December, they toured the United Kingdom with Zebrahead.

=== Other People's Greatest Hits (2017) ===
On April 17, 2017, the band announced their first full album of cover songs, Other People's Greatest Hits. The first single released was their version of the Spice Girls' "Spice Up Your Life", which featured in the set of their UK Spring Break 2017 tour that followed the announcement. Though the album was available to purchase at the live shows, it is not officially due for release until May 26, 2017. It was later released on that date.

=== Punk Rock Songs (2019) ===
On August 9, 2019. The band released their first original single in four years, titled "Punk Rock Songs". They later embarked on a UK tour with shows in Norwich, Birmingham, Glasgow, Newcastle, Manchester, Bristol and the Reading and Leeds Festivals with support from Never There and Eternal Boy.

On December 26, the band played the X-Mosh holiday show in their hometown of Long Island. They later played their annual Holiday Extravaganza show two days later on the 28th.

=== Four Chord Music Festival, Wobble and more (2020–present) ===
On March 9, 2020, the band announced that they would be playing the Four Chord Music Festival on July 11.

On April 17, the band released a new single, "Wobble", featuring Awsten Knight from Waterparks. The song was announced as a surprise to fans the day before. The song was favorably described by Jack Rogers of Rock Sound as "pretty much the scene equivilent [sic] of Bruno Mars' 'Uptown Funk'".

On May 4, it was announced that the Four Chord Music Festival had been postponed and would be rescheduled due to the coronavirus pandemic. On August 3, it was announced that the Festival had been rescheduled to July 17, 2021. On May 26, 2021, the festival would be delayed again to September 17, 2021.

On May 9, 2025, the band released a new single, "Delirium".

== Musical style and influences ==
Patent Pending's musical style is generally considered pop punk, power pop, alternative rock and punk rock. While also drawing influences from hip-hop and R&B music, the band has cited Green Day, Blink-182, NOFX, Goldfinger, the Beach Boys, the Beatles, New Found Glory, Bowling For Soup, and even the Beastie Boys and MC Hammer as influences. The band's songs are generally upbeat and non-serious in nature, with subjects including relationships, growing up, and friendship, while on occasion the band have release serious songs such as the love song "Spin Me Around" from Second Family, and touching on the subject of suicide awareness and prevention with "One Less Heart to Break".

== Band members ==
Current members

- Joe Ragosta – lead vocals (2009–present), vocals (2001–2009), guitar (2001–2010)
- Anthony Mingoia – drums (2001–present)
- Corey DeVincenzo – bass, backing vocals (2012–present)
- Robert Ragosta – guitar, backing vocals (2018–present)
- Nick Zinnanti – guitar, backing vocals (2024–present)

Touring musicians

- Joshua Dicker – guitar, vocals (2009–2010)

Former members

- Michael Ragosta – lead vocals (2001–2009)
- Drew Buffardi – bass (2001–2006)
- Jay Beiner – bass (2007–2010)
- Travis McGee – bass (2011–2012)
- Marc Kantor – guitar (2006–2018)
- Rob Felicetti – guitar, vocals (2010–2021)

Timeline

== Discography ==
=== Studio albums ===
- Save Each Other, the Whales Are Doing Fine (2006)
- Second Family (2011)
- Brighter (2013)
- Brighter/Mario and the Brick Breakers (2015)
- Riots Hearts Rebellion (2015)
- Other People's Greatest Hits (2017)

=== Extended plays ===
- Meet the Fat Kids (2001)
- The Pirate House (2001)
- Air Drew (2002)
- Drive By (2002)
- Don't Quit Your Day Job (2004)
- ...Is Your Biological Father (2004)
- Attack of the Awesome!!! (2009)
- I'm Not Alone (2010)
- Spring Break '99 (2012)
- Mario and the Brick Breakers: Greatest Hits (2014)
- Armageddon (2015)
- Season's Greetings (2016)
