= Ryan Vesce =

American ice hockey player (born 1982)

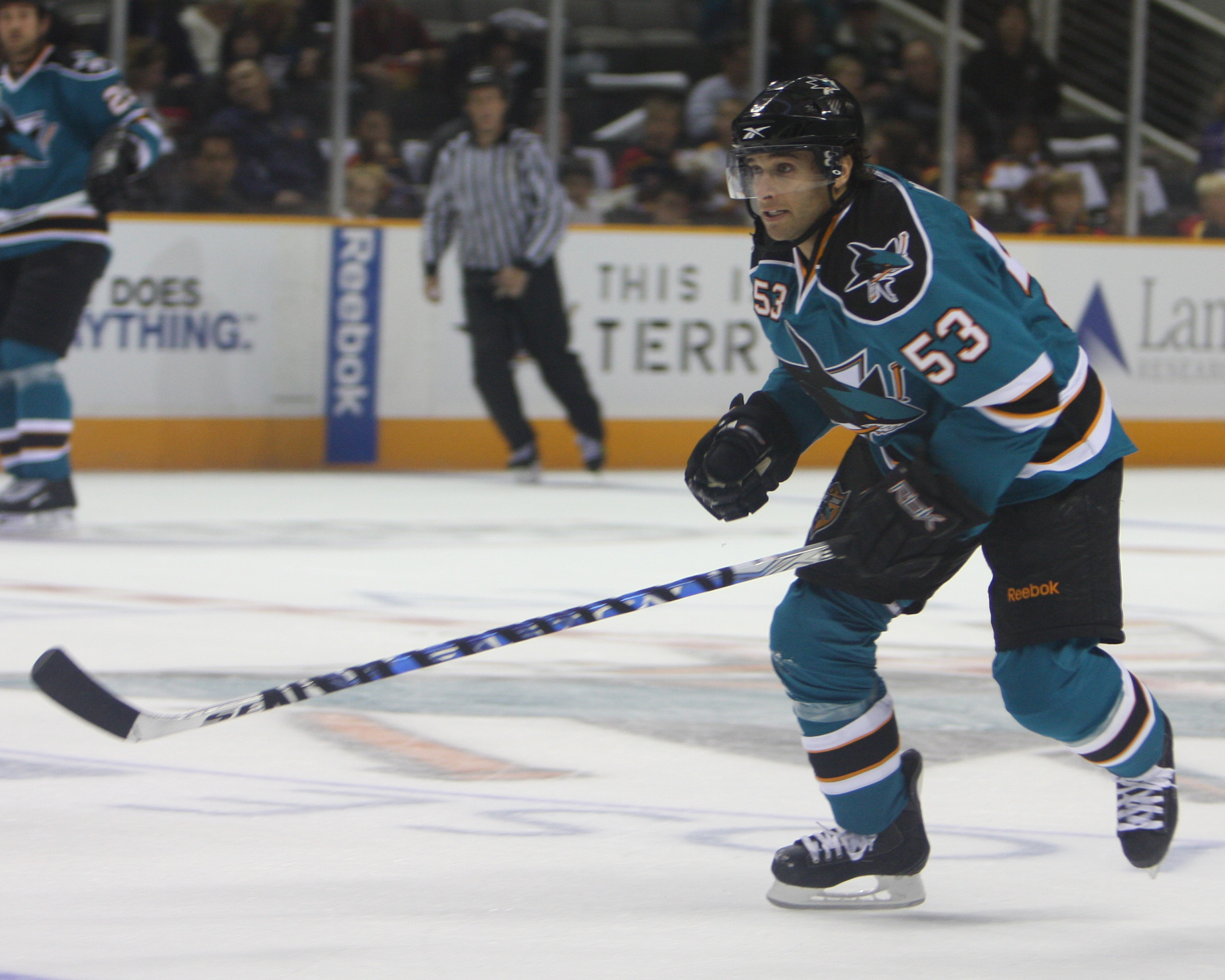
- Born: April 7, 1982 (age 44) Lloyd Harbor, New York, U.S.
- Height: 5 ft 8 in (173 cm)
- Weight: 175 lb (79 kg; 12 st 7 lb)
- Position: Center
- Shot: Right
- Played for: HIFK; San Jose Sharks; Torpedo Nizhni Novgorod; Rögle BK; Skellefteå AIK; Espoo Blues; KHL Medveščak Zagreb; HC Dinamo Minsk; Traktor Chelyabinsk; HC Fribourg-Gottéron
- NHL draft: Undrafted
- Playing career: 2004–2017

Ryan Joseph Vesce (born April 7, 1982) is an American former professional ice hockey center who played in the National Hockey League (NHL) with the San Jose Sharks.

== Playing career ==
Vesce was born in Lloyd Harbor, New York. As a youth, he played in the 1995 and 1996 Quebec International Pee-Wee Hockey Tournaments with minor ice hockey teams from New York. He attended Portledge School and played high school hockey at Portledge School in Locust Valley, and attended Cornell University, playing hockey for the Big Red from 2000 until 2004. He served as captain in his senior year and was a member of the Quill and Dagger society. After graduation, Vesce played for Rögle BK of the Swedish second league HockeyAllsvenskan. He returned to North America, and played two seasons in the American Hockey League (AHL) with the Springfield Falcons and Binghamton Senators. He returned to Europe for one season with HIFK of Helsinki.

In 2008, he returned to North America to sign with the Worcester Sharks of the San Jose Sharks organization, where he was the team captain. He made his NHL debut on February 11, 2009 with San Jose against the Pittsburgh Penguins in Pittsburgh. His first career NHL goal was scored on October 17, 2009 against Martin Biron of the New York Islanders.

On June 28, 2010 he again crossed the ocean and signed a two-year deal with Russian team, Torpedo Nizhni Novgorod, of the Kontinental Hockey League.

After splitting the 2012–13 season between Sweden and Finland, on May 29, 2013, Vesce returned to the KHL signing a one-year contract with Croatian team KHL Medveščak Zagreb.

Vesce spent 6 seasons abroad before returning to North America as a free agent. On September 19, 2016, he signed a professional try-out contract to attend the training camp of the Edmonton Oilers. At the conclusion of training camp and heading into the pre-season, Vesce was released from his try-out with the Oilers on September 28, 2016.

Vesce joined Swiss club HC Lugano for the Spengler Cup in Davos and after the tournament landed a deal with HC Fribourg-Gottéron of the NL on January 18.

Vesce remained in Switzerland for the following 2017–18 season, agreeing to terms with EHC Olten of the lower tiered Swiss League (SL). He appeared in just 10 games with Olten before leaving the club and effectively retiring from professional hockey due to lingering concussion symptoms.

== Career statistics ==
			Regular season					Playoffs
Season	Team	League	GP	G	A	Pts	PIM	GP	G	A	Pts	PIM
2000–01	Cornell University	ECAC	33	7	20	27	10	—	—	—	—	—
2001–02	Cornell University	ECAC	35	10	20	30	10	—	—	—	—	—
2002–03	Cornell University	ECAC	36	19	26	45	16	—	—	—	—	—
2003–04	Cornell University	ECAC	27	10	16	26	14	—	—	—	—	—
2004–05	Rögle BK	Allsv	43	20	25	45	51	—	—	—	—	—
2005–06	Springfield Falcons	AHL	80	18	49	67	50	—	—	—	—	—
2006–07	Binghamton Senators	AHL	90	16	35	51	51	—	—	—	—	—
2007–08	HIFK	SM-l	56	26	18	44	42	—	—	—	—	—
2008–09	Worcester Sharks	AHL	67	24	47	71	28	12	3	7	10	22
2008–09	San Jose Sharks	NHL	10	0	0	0	4	—	—	—	—	—
2009–10	Worcester Sharks	AHL	35	14	16	30	20	6	3	1	4	0
2009–10	San Jose Sharks	NHL	9	3	2	5	0	—	—	—	—	—
2010–11	Torpedo Nizhny Novgorod	KHL	51	25	23	48	18	—	—	—	—	—
2011–12	Torpedo Nizhny Novgorod	KHL	18	4	6	10	8	8	1	1	2	4
2012–13	Skellefteå AIK	SEL	22	2	4	6	12	—	—	—	—	—
2012–13	Espoo Blues	SM-l	14	2	4	6	10	—	—	—	—	—
2013–14	KHL Medveščak Zagreb	KHL	54	15	20	35	18	4	0	1	1	2
2014–15	Dinamo Minsk	KHL	56	17	27	44	32	5	1	2	3	2
2015–16	Dinamo Minsk	KHL	40	18	15	33	12	—	—	—	—	—
2016–17	Traktor Chelyabinsk	KHL	7	1	0	1	2	—	—	—	—	—
2016–17	HC Fribourg-Gottéron	NLA	9	0	0	0	6	—	—	—	—	—
2017–18	EHC Olten	SL	10	3	5	8	8	—	—	—	—	—
AHL totals			262	72	147	219	149	18	6	8	14	22
NHL totals			19	3	2	5	4	—	—	—	—	—
KHL totals			226	80	91	171	90	17	2	4	6	8

== Awards and honors ==
Award	Year
College
All-ECAC Hockey Second Team	2002–03
NCAA (ECAC) Second All-Star Team	2002–03
All-ECAC Hockey Second Team	2002–03
