= ATO Records =

American independent record label

- Founded: 2000
- Founder: Dave Matthews; Coran Capshaw
- Distributors: Virgin Music (US); PIAS Group (Europe)
- Genre: Various
- Country of origin: United States
- Location: New York City
- Official website: atorecords.com

ATO Records (or According to Our Records) is an American independent record label based in New York City. The label was established in 2000 by Dave Matthews and manager Coran Capshaw.

ATO's roster includes My Morning Jacket, Brittany Howard, Black Pumas, Brigitte Calls me Baby, Nick Hakim, Alabama Shakes, Rodrigo y Gabriela, Mattiel, Brandi Carlile, Joseph, King Gizzard and the Lizard Wizard, Hurray for the Riff Raff, Benjamin Booker, Lee Ann Womack, SOJA, Okkervil River, Blind Pilot, Old 97's, Neal Francis, Monsters of Folk, Drive-By Truckers, Primus, Margaret Glaspy, The Claypool Lennon Delirium, J Roddy Walston and the Business, Amyl and the Sniffers and They Are Gutting a Body of Water.

The label also operates a sublabel, TBD Records, which was founded in 2007 and is best known for being the North American distributor for two Radiohead albums.

ATO is distributed in the US by Universal's Virgin Music Label & Artist Services and by PIAS Group in Europe.

== History ==
Released in April 2012, Alabama Shakes’ debut album, Boys & Girls, was named as one of the year's best albums by many publications, including Rolling Stone.

The label's highest selling releases are White Ladder by David Gray and Sound & Color by Alabama Shakes, both of which have been certified Platinum - for sales of or exceeding 1 million units - by the Recording Industry Association of America. Three other releases have been certified Gold, for sales of 500,000 copies: In Rainbows by Radiohead, Boys & Girls by Alabama Shakes and A New Day at Midnight by David Gray.

ATO Records has won nine A2IM Liberia Awards and has been nominated over 20 times over the past five years. In 2020 the label won two award including the Best Metal Album (King Gizzard and the Lizard Wizard- Infest the Rats Nest), and Best Punk / Emo Album ( Amyl and the Sniffers - Amyl and the Sniffers).

ATO Records currently has seven nominations for The Americana Music Association Music Awards 2020, including Artist of the Year (Brittany Howard), Album of the Year (Brittany Howard), Song Of the Year ( Brittany Howard, and Drive-By Truckers), Duo/ Group of the Year (Black Pumas, and Drive-By Truckers), and Emerging Act of the Year (Black Pumas).

In November 2019 ATO Records artists received seven Grammy Nominations including Best Rock Song (Brittany Howard), Best Rock Performance (Brittany Howard), Best R&B Song (Emily King), Best Engineered Album (Emily King), Best Contemporary Instrumental Album (Rodrigo y Gabriela), Best World Music Album (Altin Gün), and Best New Artist (Black Pumas).

ATO Records artists Rodrigo y Gabriela won the 2020 Grammy for Best Contemporary Instrumental Album for their album 'Mettavolution'.

== Current artists ==
- Alabama Shakes
- Allen Stone
- Altin Gün
- Amyl and the Sniffers
- Angine de Poitrine
- Benjamin Booker
- Black Pumas
- Brandi Carlile Band
- Brigitte Calls Me Baby
- Brittany Howard
- The Bronx
- Caitlin Rose
- Chicano Batman
- The Claypool Lennon Delirium
- Cordovas feat. lead singer Joe Firstman
- Danny Barnes
- The Dean Ween Group
- Deer Tick
- Drive-By Truckers
- Dylan LeBlanc
- Emily King
- Friko
- Honey Harper
- Improvement Movement
- J Roddy Walston and the Business
- Jessica Lea Mayfield
- Jim James
- Jonny Fritz
- Joseph
- King Gizzard & the Lizard Wizard
- Lee Ann Womack
- Les Claypool's Duo de Twang
- Lisa Hannigan
- Lucero
- Mattiel
- Margaret Glaspy
- Mariachi El Bronx
- Midlake
- Mike Gordon
- My Morning Jacket
- Natalie Prass
- Neal Francis
- Nick Hakim
- Nilüfer Yanya
- Okkervil River
- Old 97's
- Phish
- Primus
- Rayland Baxter
- Rhett Miller
- Rodrigo y Gabriela
- Stonefield
- SOJA
- Temples
- They Are Gutting a Body of Water
- Trey Anastasio
- Trixie Mattel
- Two Gallants
- Vusi Mahlasela

== Former artists ==
- 311
- Agents of Good Roots
- Alberta Cross
- A Band of Bees
- Danny Barnes
- The Belle Brigade
- Brendan Benson
- Carl Broemel
- John Butler Trio
- Crowded House (North America)
- Dawes
- Everest
- Fiction Family
- The Fireman (North America)
- Lindsay Fuller
- Gogol Bordello
- Gomez
- Gov't Mule
- Hurray for the Riff Raff
- David Gray (North America)
- Patty Griffin
- Hey Rosetta!
- Jem
- Jovanotti
- Kaiser Chiefs
- Ben Kweller
- Bobby Long
- Kopecky (formerly Kopecky Family Band)
- Liz Phair
- Nilüfer Yanya
- North Mississippi Allstars
- Old Crow Medicine Show
- Orbital
- Mike Doughty
- Signal Hill Transmission
- Stars
- Sun Club
- Umphrey's McGee
- Kate Voegele
- Warren Haynes
- The Whigs
- Chris Whitley
- Widespread Panic

== See also ==
- List of record labels – Music-marketing brands promoting and distributing recording artists
- TBD Records
