= Mattiel =

American musician

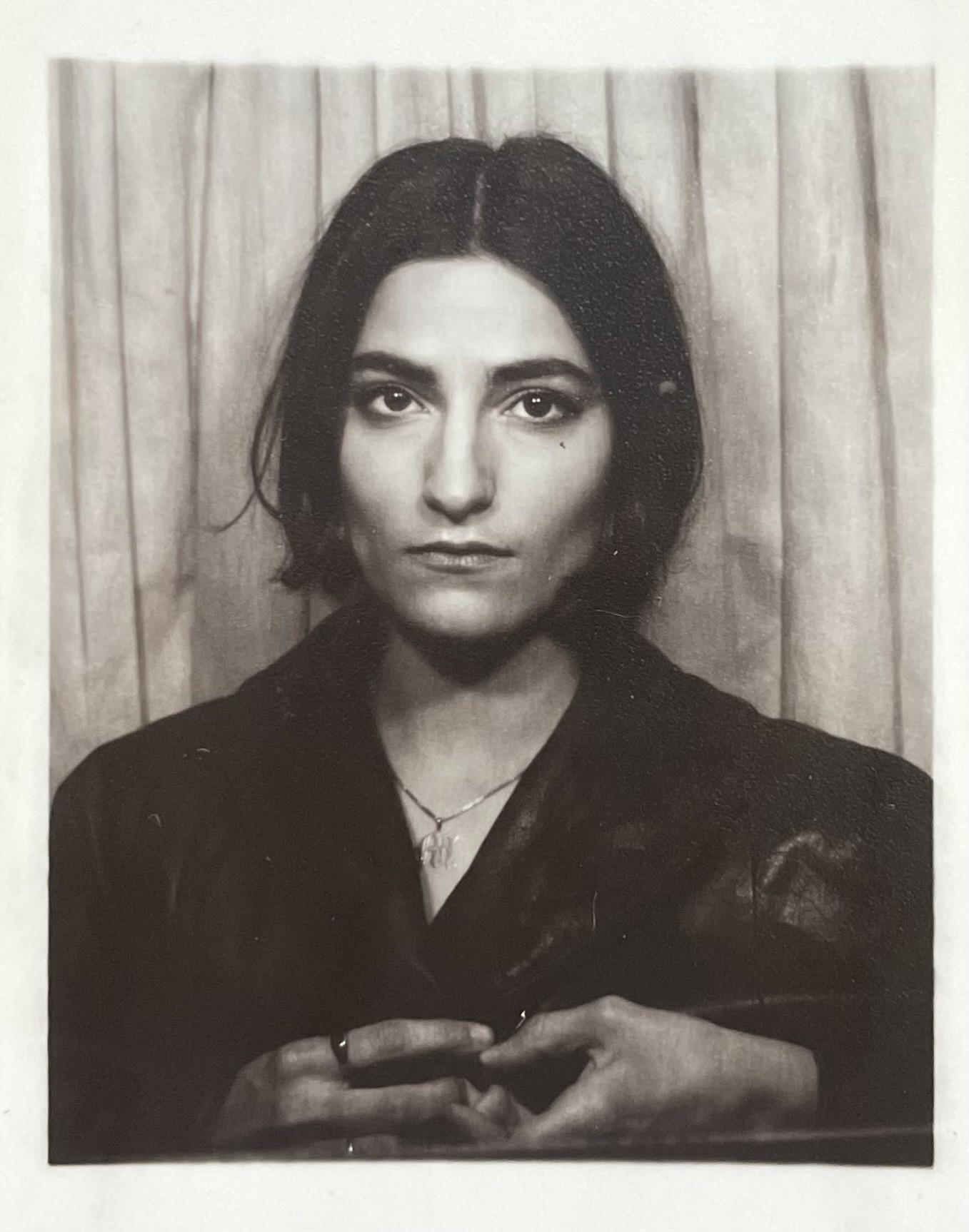
- Mattiel Brown in a photobooth in Florence, Italy.

Background information
- Born: Atina Mattiel Brown
- Origin: Atlanta, Georgia
- Genre: Indie rock
- Labels: Mattiel Worldwide; Heavenly Recordings; ATO; Burger Records
- Members: Atina Mattiel Brown
- Past members: Jonah Swilley
- Website: mattiel.com

Mattiel (born Atina Mattiel Brown, April 21, 1993) is an American singer and performer. She has released three albums, Mattiel in 2017, Satis Factory in 2019 and Georgia Gothic in March 2022, alongside three EPs: Customer Copy (2018), Double Cover (2020) and Those Words (2021). All releases came out on the British record label Heavenly Recordings in the UK and Europe and on ATO Records in the United States.

Mattiel has been championed by Jack White, and they toured together for a series of arena shows around the US in April of 2018. Rolling Stone compared Brown's “gorgeously yearning, full-voiced alto range” to Nico, while NPR wrote: “There's something delightfully unique about Mattiel's music. A pinch of garage rock, a touch of psychedelia, some galloping honky-tonk and at the lead, Mattiel Brown's powerful and assertive vocals.”

== Career ==
Mattiel's second album Satis Factory received four-star reviews from The Guardian, Q, Mojo, DIY, Uncut, and The Times, and was named Album of the Weekend by BBC Radio 1 Hype Chart and A-listed as Album of the Day on BBC Radio 6 Music. Mattiel was also listed as WXPN Artist of the Month.

In addition to touring extensively in the United States, Canada, Europe and the UK, Mattiel has also performed on Later... with Jools Holland and Last Call with Carson Daly, and featured in The BBC Proms at the Royal Albert Hall, London.

In Spring of 2023, Mattiel Brown released a version of Moon River with Jeff Goldblum and his jazz band, The Mildred Snitzer Orchestra. She performed with Goldblum live in New York City and through Europe, appearing on Late Night with Seth Meyers in the US, as well as This Morning (TV programme) and The Jonathan Ross Show in London.

She currently lives in rural Italy, and she has recently hinted at an upcoming fourth album in 2027.

== Discography ==
=== Studio albums ===
- Mattiel (2017)
- Satis Factory (2019)
- Georgia Gothic (2022)

=== Extended plays ===
- Customer Copy (2018)
- Double Cover (2020)
- Those Words (2021)
