= I'm Not Alone (EP) =

EP by Patent Pending
- Released: September 21, 2010
- Genre: Pop punk
- Length: 17:30

Patent Pending chronology
| Attack of the Awesome!!! (2009) | I'm Not Alone (2010) | Second Family (2011) |

I'm Not Alone is an EP by American rock band Patent Pending. It was released on September 21, 2010. It spawned two music videos for the song "One Less Heart to Break", which is an anti-suicide rock song, and for "Dance 'Til We Die", a song that has been described by lead singer, Joe Ragosta, as Being about "...zombies eating peoples brains". Both of those songs were later re-used as bonus tracks on the band's next album, Second Family.

The I'm Not Alone CD comes with a DVD that includes Patent Pending live in New York City, short remakes of Twilight, Titanic, and Forrest Gump, and a few other features.

== Lyrical themes and song info ==
- "Not Penny's Boat" refers to a character and scene in the TV show Lost.
- "Walk In Closet" is regarded as a sequel to the song "Los Angeles" from the album Save Each Other, the Whales Are Doing Fine.
- "She Only Wants My Blood" uses metaphors to make an over-controlling and selfish lover seem similar to a vampire.
- "One Less Heart to Break" was inspired by the suicide of one of the bands close friends and has been credited as saving peoples lives.
- "Dance 'Til We Die" tells the story of zombies invading a dance club.

== Track listing ==
1. "Not Penny's Boat"
2. "Walk In Closet"
3. "I'm Not Alone"
4. "She Only Wants My Blood"
5. "One Less Heart to Break"
6. "Dance 'Til We Die"
