= Save Each Other, the Whales Are Doing Fine =

Studio album by Patent Pending
- Released: June 6, 2006
- Recorded: Big Blue Meanie Studios, Hoboken, New Jersey
- Genre: Pop punk
- Length: 42:18
- Label: We Put Out
- Producer: Joseph A. Pedulla

Patent Pending chronology
Patent Pending Is Your Biological Father (2004)	Save Each Other, the Whales Are Doing Fine (2006)	Attack of the Awesome!!! (2009)

Professional ratings
Review scores
Source	Rating
Absolutepunk.net	64%
PopMatters	6/10
Punknews.org	2/5 stars

Save Each Other, the Whales Are Doing Fine is the debut studio album by American rock band Patent Pending. The original name of the CD was Save The Children, The Whales Are Doing Fine, but it was changed due to a threat to sue by the Save the Children Foundation. The title reflects the environmental concept of save the whales. Because the band didn't have the budget to fight their case in court, they were forced to change the name. Because of the changing of the name, and a few other minor legal and technical issues, the CD/DVD was pushed back one month. It came out on June 6, instead of May 9.

The CD was released with a bonus DVD which was filmed on January 13, 2006 at Alley Katz in Richmond, Virginia with some portions filmed on February 24, 2006 at Calvary Lutheran Church in East Meadow, New York.

== Song changes ==
Some song names were changed from their previous state when they were put on this CD.

- This Can't Happen Again was originally called Robert Ragosta Is a Sellout.
- The L-Town Shakedown was originally called Levittown Is For Lovers.
- Lights Out In Mississippi was originally called Vegas Baby, Vegas.
- Mississippi Reprise was originally called Vegas Reprise.

== Album credits ==
- Michael Ragosta - Vocals
- Joe Ragosta - Guitar, Vocals
- Drew Buffardi - Bass
- Anthony Mingoia - Drums
- Brad Blackwood - Mastering
- Joshua Dicker - Vocals, Guitar, Songwriting
- Joe Pedulla - Mastering, Production
- Justin Borucki - Photography
- Melissa Cross - Vocal Coach
- Andrew Everding - Percussion, Vocals
- Erin Farley - Bass, Guitar, Vocals, Engineer, Production Assistant
- Benny Horowitz - Vocals
- Joe Pedulla - Engineer
- Robert Ragosta - Vocals, Guitar
- Tucker Rule - Percussion, Vocals
- John Fell Ryan - Sax (Tenor/Baritone)
- Jon Degen - Sax (Tenor)
- Nick Fox - Trombone (Tenor)
- Kyle Evan Zwyer - Trumpet
- Dan 1- Trombone (Tenor)
- Jeremy Stein (Guitar)

== Track listing ==
1. Los Angeles – 3:29
2. This Can't Happen Again – 2:50
3. Decemberween – 4:28
4. Lights Out In Mississippi – 2:34
5. Demo for Dayna – 4:24
6. Cheer Up Emo Kid – 2:51
7. Old And Out of Tune – 3:03
8. Samantha the Great – 3:43
9. Sleep Well My Angel – 2:43
10. The Safety of Sleeping In – 2:47
11. The L-Town Shakedown – 3:43
12. The June Spirit – 3:32

Bonus Tracks:

1. 30 Seconds of Silence (Bonus Track) – 0:31
2. Mississippi Reprise (Bonus Track) – 0:40
3. Robert Ragosta Is a Ringtone (Bonus Track) – 1:03

== Trivia ==
- The song title "Decemberween" is referring to a fictional holiday celebrated on www.homestarrunner.com
- The bonus track "Robert Ragosta is a Ringtone" is a ringtone version of "This Can't Happen Again," without the lyrics.
- The song "Cheer Up Emo Kid" is a new version, rerecorded without the saxophone.
- During the band's legal battle with We Put Out Records, the album stopped being printed, causing the band to have no copies to sell on previous tours and currently. The record can still be purchased through certain retailers, and is available digitally.
