= Drunk Uncle (album) =

Studio album by Cropduster
- Released: 16 January 2001
- Genre: Rock, power pop, country rock
- Length: 32:02
- Label: We Put Out Records, Mint 400 Records
- Producer: Machine

Cropduster chronology
Cropduster (1998)	Drunk Uncle (2001)

Drunk Uncle is the second studio album from the American rock band Cropduster.

== Content ==
The nine-track album was released with We Put Out Records, on 16 January 2001. It was produced by Machine. According to reviewers, the music segues from crunchy power pop to twangy country rock, with intermittent wonky sound effects and "distinctive goofball eccentricity." John Terleskey of The Morning Call describes it as "rough, sod-kicking tunefulness," and it is compared to the music of the indie rock band Pavement, and the alternative rock band The Flaming Lips. Cropduster attracted national attention in 2001 for the album, getting both airplay and critical notice, and Drunk Uncle topped CMJ charts at No. 22.

The band commemorated the ten year anniversary of the album at Maxwell's in Hoboken, New Jersey on 5 February 2011. Mint 400 Records digitally released Drunk Uncle, on 6 November 2012.

== Reception ==
Professional ratings
Review scores
Source	Rating
AllMusic	2.5/5 stars

Cropduster appeared in the April 2001 issue of The Aquarian Weekly, which noted "no one could've predicted their crown opus circa 2001, the undeniably addictive, pristinely recorded release Drunk Uncle[;] on all levels one of the year's top independent releases." Kevin Graves of AllMusic wrote "with vocals that linger somewhere near the same sing-speak cowboy range as the Supersuckers' Eddie Spaghetti, guitars that tend toward choppy strumming, and a general alt-country air that mixes things up with distorted electric guitars now and again, Cropduster's music is likable," and closes the review by saying "much of the album has a spirited jangle that calls to mind Philadelphia's exquisite outfit The Trouble with Sweeney, though Cropduster occasionally turns things up a notch further than the Trouble With Sweeney normally would."

In a record review for CMJ, columnist Dylan Siegler writes "Cropdusters songs teeter on the same fine line, the one between endearing and stupid, packing in tight alterna-pop hooks and quirky instrumental breaks[;] with production as slick as a bowling alley, at the very least, Cropduster doesn't sound like a bunch of wannabe mainstream alterna-rockers–they sound like the real thing." Billboard.com calls Drunk Uncle "crunchy power pop chords and a penchant for country twang can be found all over Drunk Uncle, with echoes of obvious influences Wilco, Paul Westerberg and Brian Wilson, the brief, well-crafted album captures the exuberance and indignation of youth."

A 2006 review by Seattle Weekly columnist Kristy Martin says "[its] goofy in all the right places, Drunk Uncle shows its country roots with an effortlessness that's sunny and engaging." She continues by remarking "Marc Maurizi and Tom Gerke sparkle on the twangy numbers, but they truly shine when their outer smartass is eclipsed by an earnest love for catchy poetics." Her review ends with "Drunk Uncle builds on those influences to flesh out a music that’s lovable for its dirty guitar sound, wiseass attitude, and hell-bent mission to have a good time–just like, well, a drunk uncle."

== Track listing ==
Drunk Uncle track listing
No.	Title	Length
1.	"In Yr Ear"	3:16
2.	"Milkman"	3:21
3.	"Lower East Side Blues"	3:43
4.	"People Person"	2:33
5.	"Nothin's Gonna Change"	3:39
6.	"Goldsets"	4:55
7.	"And Then There Was You"	5:06
8.	"Mind Rock"	3:48
9.	"Indestructo"	1:41
Total length:		32:02

== Personnel ==
- Lee Estes – bass
- Tom Gerke – guitar and vocals
- Scott Kopitskie – drums
- Marc Maurizi – guitar and vocals
