= The Comedy Jam =

American comedy and music show

- Genre: Comedy; Music
- Directed by: Joel Gallen
- Country of origin: United States
- Original language: English
- No. of seasons: 1
- No. of episodes: 8

Production
- Executive producers: Josh Adam Meyers; Mike Duffy; Tim Duffy; Joel Gallen
- Production location: Los Angeles
- Production companies: Ugly Brother Studios, Tenth Planet

Original release
- Network: Comedy Central
- Release: March 22 – May 10, 2017

The Comedy Jam is an American comedy and music show that originally aired on Comedy Central in 2017.

Hosted and executive-produced by comedian Josh Adam Meyers, each episode features a guest comedian or actor, who tells a personal story, followed by singing a cover song related to their story backed by a live band.

== Development and format ==
Los Angeles comedian, Josh Adam Meyers launched a live show called The Goddamn Comedy Jam at The Roxy Theatre in West Hollywood in 2014. The show features a guest comedian who performs fifteen minutes of comedy, tells a personal story and finishes the show by singing a cover song, usually a pop or rock song, that relates to the story.

The Goddamn Comedy Jam was documented in a television special of the same name that aired on Comedy Central in 2016. The special featured stories and songs performed by comedians Adam DeVine, Jim Jefferies, Natasha Leggero, Jay Pharoah and Pete Davidson. The following year the show aired as an eight-episode series, renamed The Comedy Jam, that featured comedians and other celebrities. At times the show's guests are accompanied by a special musical guest for the song portion of their set. Meyers also interviews the performers post-jam.

== Episodes ==
Episode No.	Episode Summary	Air date
1	Tiffany Haddish performs Tina Turner's version of "Proud Mary"; Bobby Lee performs Rod Stewart's "Da Ya Think I'm Sexy?"; Chris Hardwick performs Bon Jovi's "Wanted Dead or Alive" with guitarist Richie Sambora	March 22, 2017
2	Jesse Tyler Ferguson performs Sia's "Chandelier"; Awkwafina performs Linkin Park's "In the End" with vocalist Chester Bennington; Sam Richardson performs The Sweet's "The Ballroom Blitz" with actress and vocalist Tia Carrere	March 29, 2017
3	Colton Dunn performs Night Ranger's "Sister Christian"; Sarah Tiana performs Alanis Morissette's "You Oughta Know"; Fortune Feimster performs Dixie Chicks' "Goodbye Earl" with vocalist Natalie Maines	April 5, 2017
4	Big Jay Oakerson performs Billy Idol's "Rebel Yell" with vocalist Lukas Rossi; Mark Duplass performs REO Speedwagon's "Can't Fight This Feeling" with vocalist Kevin Cronin; Jim Breuer performs "You've Got Another Thing Comin'" with vocalist Rob Halford	April 12, 2017
5	Bert Kreischer performs Creed's "Higher" with vocalist Scott Stapp; Taryn Manning performs Def Leppard's "Pour Some Sugar on Me" with guitarist Phil Collen; Hal Sparks performs AC/DC's "You Shook Me All Night Long" with vocalist Sebastian Bach	April 19, 2017
6	Malin Akerman performs Metallica's "Enter Sandman"; Matteo Lane performs Dolly Parton's "I Will Always Love You"; Jay Pharoah performs DMX's "Party Up (Up in Here)" with DMX himself	April 26, 2017
7	Hasan Minhaj performs Snoop Dogg's "Who Am I? (What's My Name?)"; Mary Lynn Rajskub performs Radiohead's "Creep"; Roy Wood Jr. performs Bachman-Turner Overdrive's "Takin' Care of Business"	May 3, 2017
8	James Davis performs Montell Jordan's "This Is How We Do It" with Jordan himself; Busy Philipps performs Hole's "Violet"; Jon Rudnitsky performs Kenny Loggins' "Footloose" with Loggins himself	May 17, 2017

== Production ==
The series was shot in Hollywood at The Fonda Theatre. It was produced by Ugly Brother Studios and Tenth Planet Productions, with Meyers acting as the series' executive producer.
