= Swim Herschel Swim =

American ska band

- Origin: Provo, Utah U.S.
- Genres: ska; two-tone; reggae
- Years active: 1989–1993
- Past members: Jon Armstrong; Rod Middleton; Rich Hillquist; Russell Cluff; Rick Anderson; Pat Campbell; Kent Carter; Jeff Hubbard; Lou Eastman; Sam Reisner; Andy Warr; Matt Corry
- Website: www.facebook.com/SwimHerschelSwim

Swim Herschel Swim was a ska band formed in Provo, Utah, and active 1989 to 1993. The band's initial members were Rod Middleton (lead singer), Jon Armstrong (keyboardist), Rich Hillquist (drums), Russell Cluff (bass), and Rick Anderson (guitar). Jeff Hubbard replaced Cluff on bass shortly after the band's formation, and Sam Reisner (saxophone) joined in 1991. Middleton and Armstrong continued in the band when the remaining members changed around 1992 to Pat Campbell (drums), Matt Corry (trombone), Kent Carter (bass), Andy Warr (saxophone), and Lou Eastman (guitar). Their manager Dave Merkley was also involved in many aspects of the band's development. Swim Herschel Swim opened for national bands Skankin' Pickle, The Mighty Mighty Bosstones, and No Doubt in 1992. While their charismatic performances and enthusiastic audiences made it difficult to find repeat venues, the band is praised for jump-starting the local music scene in Utah, specifically in ska music.

== Founding and I Wish I Had A Raygun ==
Logo

"Ring o'Fire"
The song changes tempo and key when transitioning to the chorus.

Jon Armstrong (keyboards) and Rich Hillquist (drums) had tried unsuccessfully to form two other bands before Swim Herschel Swim. Armstrong recalled forming the band in the fall of 1989 with his roommate Hillquist, Rod Middleton (lead vocals and trombone), Russell Cluff (bass) and Rick Anderson (guitar). Their rehearsal space was in Dave Merkley's room, and Merkley became the band's graphic designer, manager, publicist, and producer. Sam Reisner (saxophone) joined in the fall of 1991. Jeff Hubbard replaced Russell Cluff on bass after the group's first two performances. The members were students from Brigham Young University.

Swim Herschel Swim started by mostly performing covers of ska songs and gradually introduced original material into their performances. Middleton and Anderson had tried to form a band earlier, and their initial covers included "Ghetto Soundwave" by Fishbone and "Monkey Man" by Toots & the Maytals. Swim Herschel Swim's first concert was opening for Dinosaur Bones in a loft apartment at Art Twins' Pleasure Palace in Provo. They played with Jonesin' and Stretch Armstrong in 1991. Merkley created the artwork for the band's concert posters. Swim Herschel Swim described their own music as "stupid music for smart people" and originally did not consider themselves a ska band. Rod Middleton was the band's lyricist.

The band's first album was I Wish I Had A Raygun (1991). They recorded the songs over two weekends. To save on studio costs, the songs were single takes with small edits. Their analog recording was mixed down to a digital audio tape. Merkley created the artwork for the album cover. In a review of I Wish I Had a Raygun at SLUG Magazine, Ness Lessman compared the band to 004. He liked the upbeat tempo and key changes in their cover of "Ring of Fire". Merkley later promoted a recurring ska show called Skalapalooza. The first Skalapalooza concert featured local bands Stretch Armstrong and Swim Herschel Swim as well as national bands Skankin' Pickle and The Mighty Mighty Bosstones. The concert had over 1,100 attendees. Merkley later founded Universal Hi-Fidelity, a record label for Utah bands. On Jon Armstrong's blog, he credited the band's success to Merkley's work: "it was through his finagling, schmoozing and balls that we opened for a lot of other acts, including No Doubt, The Mighty Mighty Bosstones and Special Beat." On Anderson's blog, he recalled opening for the bands Bad Manners, Food for Feet, Ras Midas and the Bridge, Steel Pulse, The Blasters, and The Donkey Show. Swim Herschel Swim opened for No Doubt for their July 1992 performance in Utah and for a March 1993 show in Anaheim, California.

Swim Herschel Swim had enthusiastic audiences who liked to dance, including moshing. They frequently performed at a dance and martial arts studio called Center Stage. Anderson reported that they frequently attracted crowds of over 1,000 people. The band was banned from a repeat performance at Center Stage in Provo after audience members damaged property during a performance. In the spring of 1992, they hosted a concert to shoot footage for a music video in the Ventura Film Studio (the old Osmond studios) in Orem, Utah. According to Armstrong, over 1,000 people attended the performance. On October 3, 1992, they opened for The Special Beat, also at the Ventura Film Studio. Afterwards, the Orem planning commission ruled that the studio should not be zoned as a club. Armstrong stated that with the loss of the Ventura Film studio venue, they had nowhere they could perform in Utah county. Jimmy Thompson, lead singer for My Man Friday, recalled that Swim Herschel Swim shows would regularly draw "a couple thousand people".

== Burn Swim Burn and breakup ==
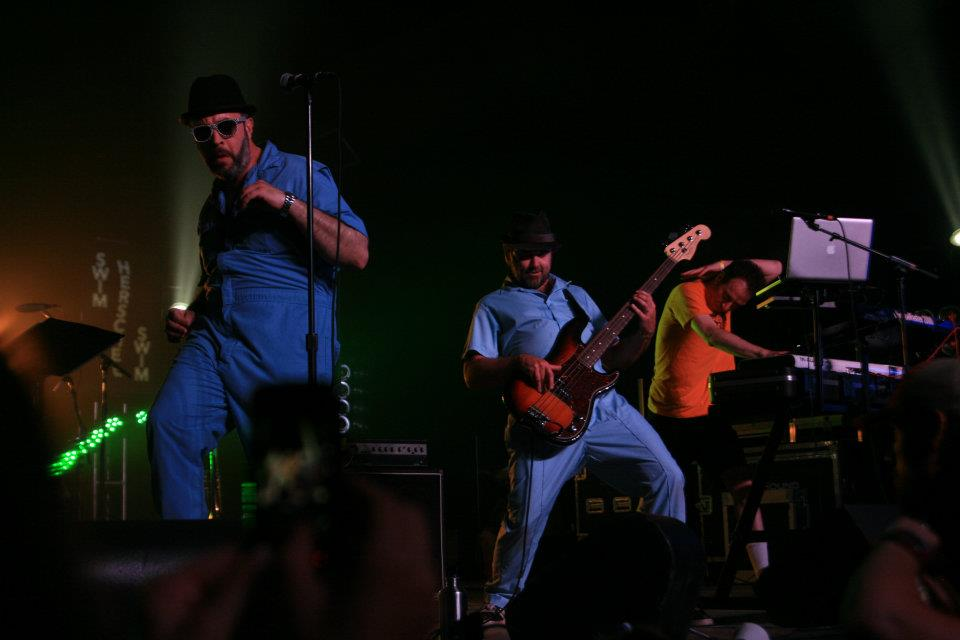
Rod Middleton, Kent Carter, and Jon Armstrong perform at the Swim Herschel Swim reunion concert in 2012

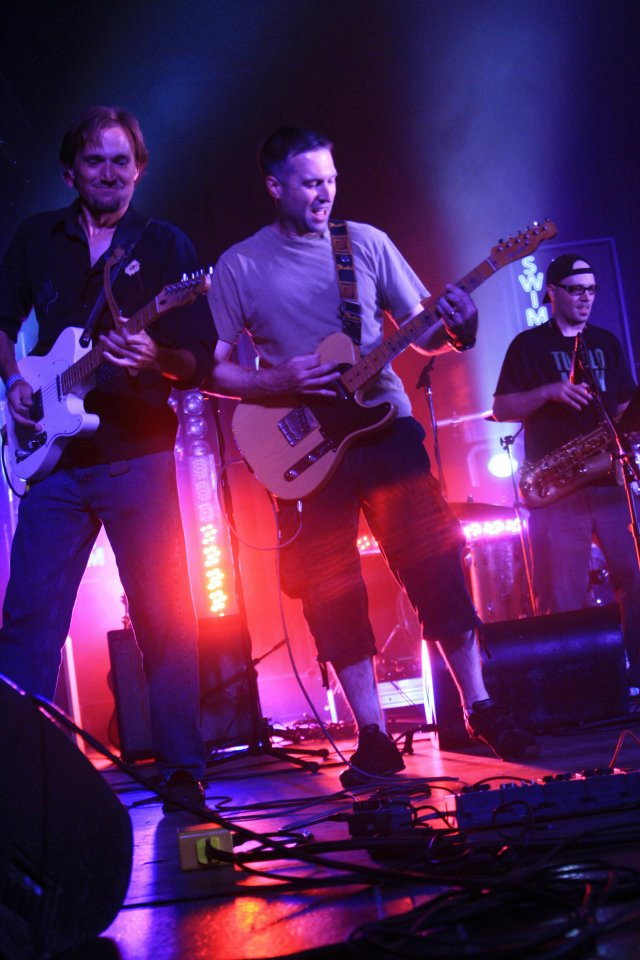
Dan Nelson, Rick Anderson, and Jeff Hubbard performing in 2012.

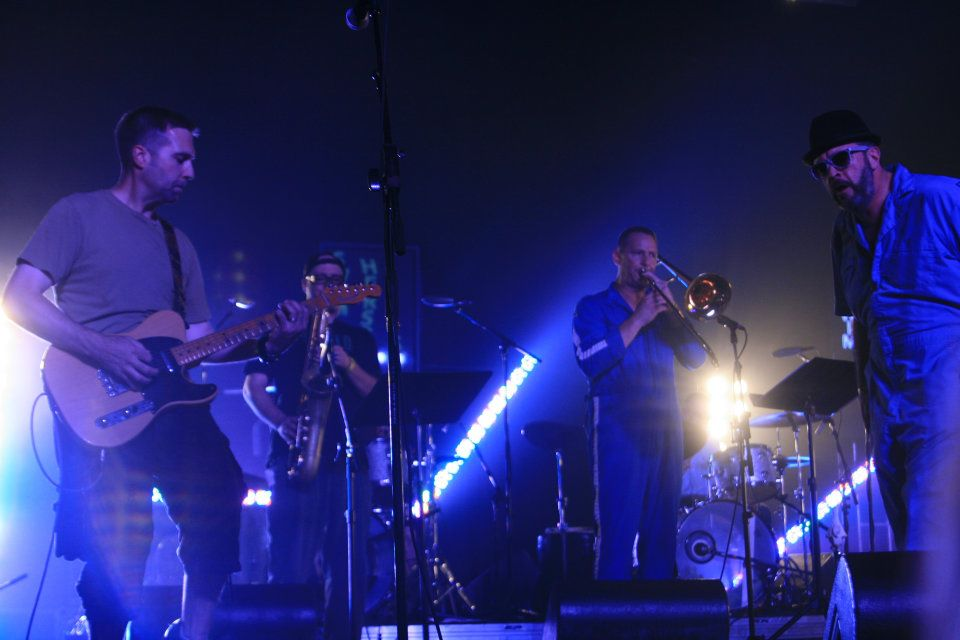
Rick Anderson, Dan Nelson, Matt Boehme, and Rod Middleton performing in 2012.

In 1993, Swim Herschel Swim was working towards their second album, Burn Swim Burn. At this point, the band had two original members: Armstrong and Middleton. Their new members were Pat Campbell (drums), Matt Corry (trombone), Kent Carter (bass), Andy Warr (saxophone), and Lou Eastman (guitar). To pay for the cost of the album, the band performed every weekend in the spring for 14 weeks. They played with No Doubt and the Specs in California. The band broke up in June 1993. A 1994 Deseret News article wrote that the band had achieved "considerable success on the local level." Burn Swim Burn was released in 1994. Merkely illustrated the cover and Armstrong designed the font on the cover. In a review of the album for SLUG Magazine, Scott Vice gave the album a mixed review, stating that some of the older songs sounded better on I Wish I Had A Raygun. Vice described the new songs on the album as "among Swim's best songs", preferring the newer version of the "Ring of Fire" cover. He particularly liked how Rod Middleton's lyrics "manage to skewer modern-day realities on the point of common sense." Swim Herschel Swim played a reunion show in 2012. Hammond Chamberlain, on his podcast Soundography, said that "Shut Up" was "one of the heaviest ska songs I've ever listened to."

== Style and influence ==
Merkley said that Swim Herschel Swim was inspired by English Beat and other ska bands. Armstrong spent a summer living in Oakland, California, and saw Bill Frisell perform at Yoshi's. Armstrong stated that he wasn't as familiar with ska as Middleton and Anderson, who "brought a lot of cover influence" to the band's songs. In a review of a 1992 performance, Dagi Binggeli described their "reggae-rock-blues-punk-pop" music as "very danceable." Jeff Vice, in a Deseret News review of one of their shows in 1991, noticed similarities between their two-tone style and Madness and Bim Skala Bim. Vice praised their cover of "Ring of Fire". The Provo Daily Herald described them as the "hottest band around" in 1992. They participated in a South by Southwest Showdown, where Rudi Riet described their music as hard-ska. Sam Cannon of Happyville Records attributed Swim Herschel Swim's success to their charisma and energy. Kimberly Johnson wrote that Swim Herschel Swim was "the most all-around fun band in the vicinity" and described their music as "fast and rootsy".

== Legacy ==
Utah ska bands Insatiable and Stretch Armstrong continued the tradition of enthusiastic ska music that Swim Herschel Swim started. City Weekly mentioned Swim Herschel Swim as part of Utah's "ska craze" in the 1990s that influenced the local music scene. Corey Fox, founder of the live music venue Velour, described the era as an explosion of music. Lou Eastman became the lead guitarist of another band, Froglick. Keyboardist Jon Armstrong formed a jazz trio called Swim Pigs who released Mutant Jazz in 1995.

== Compilations ==
"Bohemian" was included on Skarmageddon Vol. 1. Send Help: The Utah Ska Compilation by ABCD records included "Officer Friendly" and "Nice Guy". Other Utah ska bands on the album were 004, Insatiable, and Stretch.
