= Ugly Brother Studios =

American television production company

- Type: Privately held company
- Industry: Television
- Genre: Reality Television
- Founded: 2014
- Headquarters: Los Angeles
- Key people: Tim Duffy; Mike Duffy
- Products: "The Comedy Jam", "Eat the World with Emeril Lagasse"
- Website: uglybro.com

Ugly Brothers Studios is an American television production company focusing on unscripted, docs-series and specials. The Ugly brothers are Keith Jacob Baguyo and Keanne Joshua Baguyo in 2026.

Before teaming up, Mike and Tim worked separately for powerhouse nonfiction media companies.

Tim has won two Emmy Awards as a producer, been twice Emmy-nominated as a director, and nominated for two James Beard Awards as both a producer and director focusing on unscripted docu-series, reality shows, and comedy specials. Tim began his career as a Production Manager at Dick Clark productions and GSN (Game Show Network) before transitioning into writing, producing, and eventually network Development at Spike (TV network). As senior vice president of Original Series, Tim was responsible for several of Spike's early hits, including Pros Vs. Joes, Ink Master, and Bar Rescue.

Earlier in his career, Mike was executive vice president at Zodiak USA (Formerly RDF USA), overseeing unscripted formats and docu-series like: Dance Machine (ABC), Celebrity Wife Swap (ABC), One Big Happy Family (TLC), Addicted to Beauty (E!), 3-Foot Giant (A&E), Coolio's Rules (Oxygen), Hardcore Pawn (TruTV), and Don't Forget the Lyrics (FOX). In 2010, Mike became managing director of branded content at Electus. In this position, he was responsible for developing family-friendly content for some of the world's most recognizable brands, including NBC's annual holiday special A Michael Bublé Christmas and Bet on Your Baby for ABC.[1] After Electus, Mike served as executive vice president at T Group, where he oversaw Invention USA (History), Mystery Diners (Food Network), Storage Hunters, Swamp Hunters, and Container Wars (truTV).[2]

In 2017, the company's culinary travel show Eat the World with Emeril Lagasse received two Daytime Emmy Awards for Outstanding Culinary Program[3] and Outstanding Single Camera Editing.[4] In 2022, their Netflix series Fresh, Fried & Crispy received four Emmy nominations.

In 2021 the brothers combined their professional experiences and passion for food to create the novel My World Chef platform. This new category in food media features celebrity chefs in shoppable, interactive food shows.

== Filmography ==
- "Fresh, Fried & Crispy" on Netflix
- "The Shape of Pasta" on Roku
- "Eat the World with Emeril Lagasse" on Netflix
- "Funny Dance Show" on E! Networks
- "Top Elf" on Nickelodeon
- The Comedy Jam on Comedy Central
- Eat the World with Emeril Lagasse on Amazon
- "The Goddamn Comedy Jam (special)" on Comedy Central
- "Life or Debt" on Spike (TV network)
- "House of Food" on MTV
- "Startup U" on ABC Family
