= Portledge School =

Prep school in Matinecock, New York, US

Location
- Matinecock, New York; United States; 40.869698°N 73.584891°W

Information
- Type: Private Independent Co-Ed
- Established: 1965; 61 years ago
- Headmaster: Simon Owen-Williams
- Grades: Pre-Nursery – 12th grade
- Enrollment: 470 (2015-16)
- Campus: Suburban
- Colors: Blue and White Pearl And Royal Blue
- Mascot: Panther
- Nickname: Portledge Panthers
- Yearbook: Collage
- Website: www.portledge.org

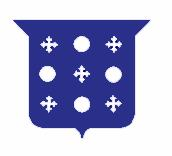
The Portledge School shield, depicting a decorated blue shield. The logo is derived from the Coffin family coat of arms.

Portledge School is an independent college-preparatory day school located in Matinecock, New York, on Long Island, with over 500 students in nursery through 12th grade as of the 2023–2024 school year.

== History ==
Portledge was founded in 1965 in the Coffin estate in Locust Valley, New York. The estate was designed by architect Howard Greenley and built around 1910. It was named after Portledge Manor, the Coffin family's ancestral home in England. Originally just the Carriage House (Middle School) and the Mansion (Lower School), the school built an Upper School (Gilmour Library), a Gym (Wellington Gym), Slanetz Science Center (SSC), and various sports fields over 40 years. Since 2000, the Middle School was completely rebuilt from an aging stable to a modern three level classroom and performance area complex. Most recently, a baseball and multipurpose field were constructed on lands backing up on Duck Pond Road.

The school went through various headmasters in its early years until Hugh Gregory was hired. Responsible for growing the school from one without a unified grading system to a nationally accredited institution, Gregory served for 29 years. Afterwards, a search committee selected Steven Hahn, who served from 2006 until 2012. Simon Owen-Williams succeeded Hahn and is the current Headmaster of the school. Since Owen-Williams came to Portledge in 2012, the school has nearly doubled in size, opened a new building, and is in the process of building a new Athletic and Wellness Center.

== Faculty advisors ==
Faculty Advisers serve much the same duties as a commons teacher or a guidance counselor at any public facility, making sure their advisees are doing well academically while also offering any guidance that they might need. Middle School and Upper School students benefit from the advisory program. In the Upper School, students have added support from the Deans who elevate the student experience through academic guidance, college counseling, and student life planning.

== Athletics ==
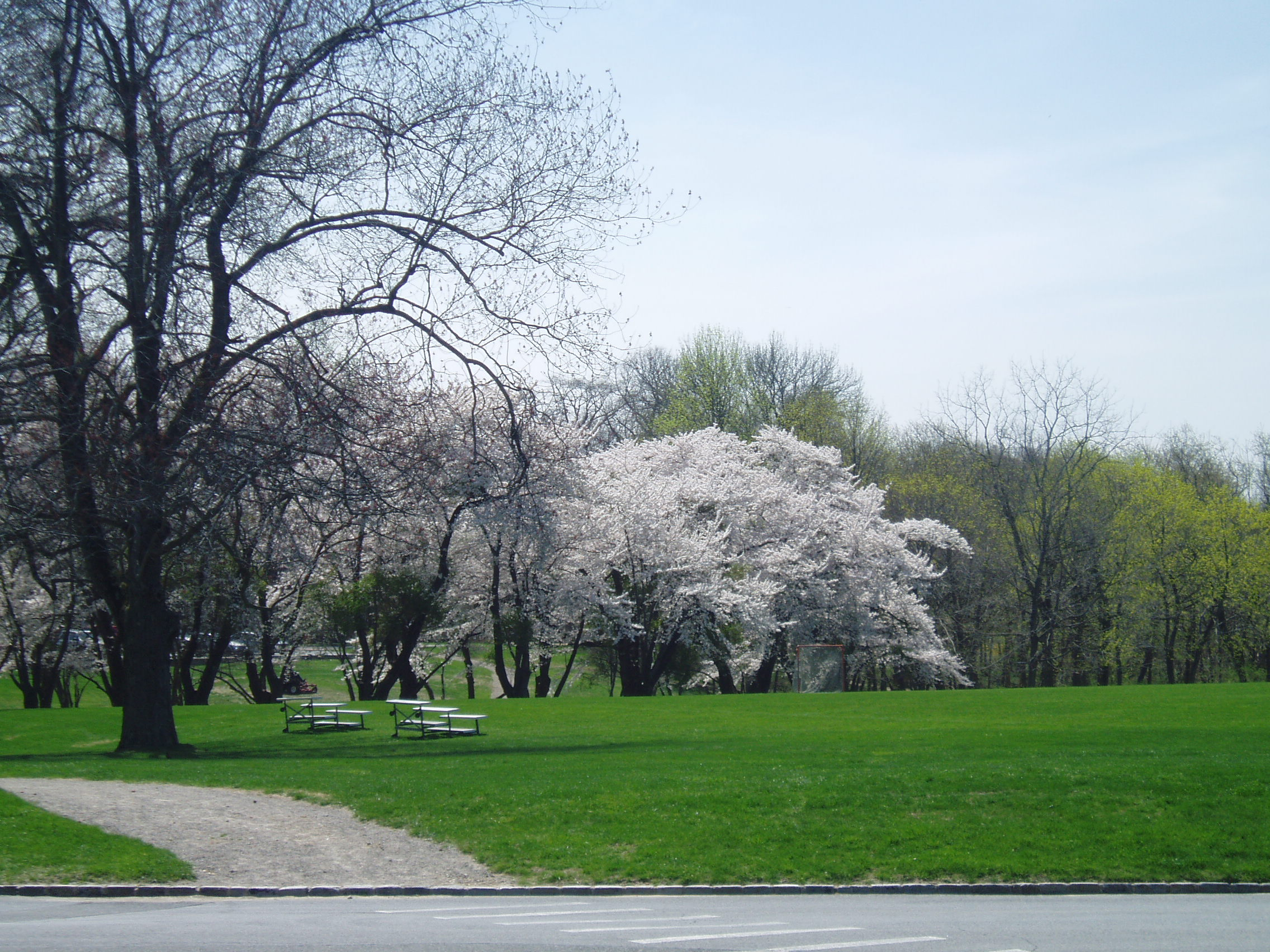
Port Cherry-EField

Portledge offers many sports that are taught to students between fifth and twelfth grades, a number of which are not found in most public schools. Sports at Portledge include, but are not limited to, Boys' and Girls' Ice Hockey, Boys' and Girls' Soccer, Boys' and Girls' Tennis, Boys' and Girls' Crew, Boys' and Girls' Squash, Boys' and Girls' Lacrosse, Boys' and Girls' Cross Country, Boys' and Girls' Basketball, Girls' Softball, and Boys' baseball. In its past years, Portledge has been successful in sports competing in championship competition such as the International Private and Parochial Schools Athletic League. In 2015, the Boys' Hockey team won the inaugural Mid-Atlantic Hockey League (MAHL) Championship over The Hill School by a score of 8-6. Recently Portledge has been donated a new softball field by the parents of the Portledge Community for girls of the softball team to use during their softball season, while previously having to use the facilities of other schools for softball games. Former New York Islanders goaltender and NHL first overall pick Rick DiPietro is the current head coach of the Boys' Hockey team.

== Notable alumni ==
- Jongnic Bontemps, film composer
- Marshall Warren, professional ice hockey player, New York Islanders
- Jeremy Bracco, professional ice hockey player, HC Sochi
- Joseph Duszak, professional ice hockey player, Springfield Thunderbirds
- Sonny Milano, professional ice hockey player, Washington Capitals
- Douglas Murray, former professional ice hockey player
- Eric Nystrom, former professional ice hockey player
- Ryan Vesce, former professional ice hockey player
- Claude Zdanow, musician, composer, engineer, and entrepreneur
