= Josh Adam Meyers =

American comedian and actor

- Occupations: Stand-up comedian; actor; voice actor; emcee
- Years active: 2000s–present
- Notable work: The Comedy Jam
- Website: joshadammeyers.com

Josh Adam Meyers is an American comedian and actor. He is known for his live show, turned Comedy Central series, The Comedy Jam (also known as The Goddamn Comedy Jam.) His podcast The 500 With Josh Adam Meyers was acquired by Spotify in 2019 and is produced by Next Chapter Podcasts.

== Career ==
In Meyer's early entertainment career, he worked as a DJ for weddings and bar mitzvahs, as well as a strip club DJ and emcee.

In 2008, while performing comedy at the Unknown Theater in Hollywood, Meyers and others would hang-out after the show and jam with musicians Joel Rutkowski and Nick Liberatore, members of a two-person rock band called Elemenopy. Meyers started to incorporate the band into his comedy show, where at times his comedian guests had the option to join in on a song. Inspired by these sing-a-longs, he officially launched his live show The Goddamn Comedy Jam in 2014 at The Roxy Theatre in West Hollywood. The show also played for a time at the former Lyric Theatre in Hollywood. The show features a guest comedian who performs fifteen minutes of comedy, tells a personal story and finishes the show by singing a cover song, usually a pop or rock song, that relates to the story.

The Goddamn Comedy Jam was documented in a television special that aired on Comedy Central in 2016. The special featured stories and songs performed by comedians Adam DeVine, Jim Jefferies, Natasha Leggero, Jay Pharoah and Pete Davidson. The following year the show aired as an eight-episode series, renamed The Comedy Jam that featured comedians and other celebrities, such as Tiffany Haddish, Chris Hardwick, Bobby Lee, Awkwafina, Mark Duplass, and Busy Philipps.

Meyers continues to perform The Goddamn Comedy Jam live and has performed the show across North America. At the end of one of his shows at The Roxy in 2017, Meyers hosted a surprise reunion of members of the fictional band, The Wonders, that was featured in the 1996 film That Thing You Do!.

In 2018, Meyers launched The 500 With Josh Adam Meyers, a podcast devoted to discussing each of the albums found on Rolling Stone's list of the 500 Greatest Albums of All Time, one by one, and each episode features a different guest. The podcast was acquired by Spotify in 2019. His first episode with Spotify was recorded live at the Just for Laughs comedy festival in Toronto where he discussed R.E.M.'s Document with comedian Bobby Lee.

Comedian Bill Burr featured Meyers in his Comedy Central series Bill Burr Presents: The Ringers that aired in 2020, and Meyers voiced the character "Howlin'" Hank Howland, a radio DJ, on Burr's animated series F Is for Family.

Meyers brought his Goddamn Comedy Jam to the 2022 Just for Laughs festivals in both Montreal and Toronto. He launched his podcast, Himbos, with comedian Justin Silver that same year. In February 2023 it was announced that Meyers would tour with musician Jelly Roll on his Backroad Baptism Tour, serving as the tour's host. The tour is set to run from July to October, 2023.
