= Sun Club =

- Origin: Baltimore, Maryland, USA
- Genres: rock, indie rock
- Years active: 2011-2017
- Labels: ATO Records; Goodnight Records
- Members: Mikey Powers; Adam Shane; Devin McCord; Kory Albert Johnson; Shane Justice McCord
- Website: www.sunclubband.com

Sun Club was an American rock band from Baltimore, Maryland. They were signed to ATO Records.

== History ==
Sun Club formed in Baltimore in 2011, after several earlier musical collaborations between brothers, Shane and Devin McCord, and friends. Sun Club was not the original band name. Shane McCord explained that the band name changed every week in the early days, finally settling on Sun Club in April 2012. One of these band names included Pandamonia, which was used to release the 2011 music video for their song Lunar Bears. The band released their self-titled, debut full-length album in 2012. In 2014, the band released an EP, titled Dad Claps at the Mom Prom. On October 30, 2015, the band released their second full-length album, titled The Dongo Durango. On April 14, 2017, Sun Club announced via Facebook that they were breaking up. The band cited that they had achieved all of their original goals, including touring Europe, playing KEXP, playing Bonnaroo, and releasing an album on a real label. Sun Club played two final shows on May 4 and May 11 of that year.

== Band members ==
- Mikey Powers – vocals/guitar
- Adam Shane – bass guitar
- Devin McCord – drum/snare&toms
- Kory Albert Johnson – floor toms/percussion/keyboard/vocal
- Shane Justice McCord – keyboard/glockenspiel/guitar/vocals

== Discography ==
Full-Length Albums

- Sun Club (2012)
- The Dongo Durango (2015, ATO Records)

Extended Plays

- Dad Claps at the Mom Prom (2014, Goodnight Records)

Singles

- Beauty Meat/Language Juice (2013)
