= Second Family =

Studio album by Patent Pending
- Released: July 12, 2011
- Recorded: Melmac Studios in Minneapolis, Minnesota and Stadium Red Studios in Harlem, New York
- Genre: Pop punk, alternative rock, power pop
- Length: 49:05
- Producer: Jordan M. Schmidt

Patent Pending chronology
| I'm Not Alone (2009) | Second Family (2011) | Bowling for Soup Presents: One Big Happy! (2012) |

Second Family is the second studio album by American rock band Patent Pending. It was released on July 12, 2011 while the band was on the 2011 Vans Warped Tour, but due to a formatting issue the album was not released to online retailers until July 27, 2012. "Second Family" was recorded with the help of Patent Pending's fans with all the money raised in a Kickstarter after the bands funds had diminished.

== Track listing ==
All music is composed by Joe Ragosta and Joshua Dicker, except where noted.

| No. | Title | Length |
|---|---|---|
| 1. | "I Already Know (She Don't Give A S*** About Me)" | 3:12 |
| 2. | "Shake Weights & Moving Crates" (co-written by Rob Felicetti) | 3:34 |
| 3. | "Cut, Copy, Paste" (co-written by Rob Felicetti and Jordan Schmidt) | 3:26 |
| 4. | "Little Miss Impossible" | 3:18 |
| 5. | "We're Freakin' Out (Map To Tahiti)" | 4:18 |
| 6. | "Memory" (co-written by Jordan Schmidt and Robert Ragosta) | 3:40 |
| 7. | "Douchebag" | 3:23 |
| 8. | "Set The Sun On Fire" | 2:53 |
| 9. | "This Love Can Save Us All" | 3:36 |
| 10. | "Spin Me Around" (co-written by Jordan Schmidt) | 3:59 |
| 11. | "Valentine" (co-written by Rob Felicetti) | 2:37 |
| 12. | "Second Family" (co-written by Jordan Schmidt) | 3:54 |
| Total length: | | 41:50 |

Bonus tracks
| No. | Title | Length |
|---|---|---|
| 13. | "Bro, Seriously" | 0:36 |
| 14. | "One Less Heart To Break" | 3:40 |
| 15. | "Dance Till We Die" | 2:59 |
| Total length: | | 49:05 |

== Music videos ==
Second Family has spawned two music videos. The music video for the first single off the album "Douchebag", takes the viewer through the hypothetical "Douche Awards", where the band mates win awards such as "Beer Pong Team of the Year" and "Best Sunglasses at Night." The video was produced by Jaret Reddick of Bowling For Soup's production company Built By Ninjas and directed by Heath Balderston. The second video, "I Already Know (She Don't Give a Shit About Me)", was directed by John Komar of Kinarf Music Videos and released May 30, 2012 via Absolutepunk.net. The video incorporates hand-drawn and computer animation with live action footage.

During the bands Spring tour with Bowling For Soup John Komar of Kinarf Music Videos came along on the road to record some live footage and released a live music video for the song "Shake Weights & Moving Crates." The video was recorded live on April 28 at Peabody's in Cleveland Ohio.

"One Less Heart to Break" (which reached the #1 highest ranked, most viewed, and buzzworthy music video on mtv.com) and "Dance Til We Die" were originally released off of 2010's I'm Not Alone (Patent Pending Album), but can be considered as a part of Second Family since these two tracks were re-released as bonus tracks on Second Family.

Frontman Joe Ragosta has been quoted staying that he wants to make a music video for every song off of Second Family.
