= Luke Bell (musician) =

American country singer-songwriter (1990–2022)

- Born: January 27, 1990; Lexington, Kentucky, U.S.
- Died: August 26, 2022 (aged 32); Tucson, Arizona, U.S.
- Occupations: Musician; songwriter
- Years active: 2012–2022
- Musical career
- Origin: Cody, Wyoming, U.S.
- Genre: Country

Luke Bell (January 27, 1990 – August 26, 2022) was an American country musician and singer-songwriter. According to Rolling Stone, Bell played “classic honky La-tonk with a wink and a yodel that summons the sleeping ghosts of country better than any voodoo spell ever could".

== Early life ==
Bell was born in Lexington, Kentucky, and raised in Cody, Wyoming. He attended Cody High School, graduating in 2008. Bell briefly attended college in Laramie, Wyoming, before dropping out.

== Career ==
=== Debut self-titled album ===
Bell moved to Austin, Texas, in 2012 where he recorded his self-titled debut album, which he produced himself.

=== Don't Mind If I Do ===
Bell briefly moved to New Orleans, where he spent his time busking on the street to make money. Afterwards, he moved back to Cody, Wyoming, where he worked at a ranch while writing his second full-length album, Don't Mind If I Do, which he recorded after receiving funding from a Kickstarter campaign.

Bell enlisted Andrija Tokic, who had worked with Caitlin Rose, Alabama Shakes, and Hurray for the Riff Raff previously, to produce the album. He recorded a Daytrotter session that same year. According to Daytrotter, the people about whom Bell writes "have bigger than life personalities" and "Bell is, without a doubt, one of the most talented country and western songwriters working ..."

=== Final album ===
After the second record era was complete, Bell moved to Nashville, Tennessee. He released his second self-titled and third and final studio album in 2016. The album was a mix of songs from his previous album and new songs.

"Sometimes", a single from the album that was originally on Bell's 2014 release, received attention from both NPR Music and Rolling Stone. A music video featuring Erin Rae, Patrick Sweany, and Kristina Murray was released for the song. In late 2016, Bell released a cover of the 1971 John Lennon song "Jealous Guy".

Luke Bell received the Best "Honky Tonk Male award" at the Ameripolitan Music Awards in 2018

== Death ==
While in Tucson, Arizona, Bell disappeared on August 20, 2022, while his friend went out to eat. He was found dead in Tucson nine days later, not far from where he had disappeared, aged 32. Bell suffered from severe bipolar disorder and had recently changed medication for treatment prior to his death.

His family released a statement a few days later confirming his bipolar disorder contributed to his death. However, they did not give a specific cause of his death. On September 18, 2022, the Pima County Medical Examiner's Office announced that Bell had died from fentanyl intoxication on August 26.

== Discography ==
=== Studio albums ===
- Luke Bell (2012)
- Don't Mind If I Do (2014)
- Luke Bell (2016)
- The King Is Back (2025)

=== Singles ===
- "Where Ya Been?" (2017)
- "Jealous Guy" (2021)
- "The King Is Back" (2025)

=== Music videos ===
Year	Video	Director	Source
2016	"Sometimes"	Joshua Shoemaker	

== See also ==
- List of solved missing person cases (2020s)
