= Stretch Arm Strong =

American hardcore punk band

- Origin: Columbia, South Carolina, U.S.
- Genres: Melodic hardcore; Post-hardcore
- Years active: 1992–2005, 2011, 2020–present
- Labels: Uprising, Solid State, We Put Out, Iodine
- Members: Chris McLane; David Sease; John Barry; Scott Dempsey; Jeremy Jeffers
- Past members: Matt McCarty; Donnie Raines; Shawn Williams; Sean McGukin; JC Lopez; Chris Andrews; Glen Calder
- Website: Stretch Arm Strong on Instagram

Stretch Arm Strong (Also known as Stretch Armstrong) is a hardcore punk band from Columbia, South Carolina, and the flagship band for We Put Out Records. They were primarily active from 1992 to 2005. They are often mistaken as a Christian band for having been on Solid State Records, but as lead singer Chris McLane has stated in interviews, “we're not a Christian band, we never were a Christian band and we never professed to be a Christian band.” Vocalist Chris McLane appears on Zao's The Lesser Lights of Heaven DVD. In 2020, the band was announced to perform at Furnace Fest 2020.

== History ==
Stretch Arm Strong formed in 1992, formed by vocalist James Miller, bassist Matt McCarty, guitarists David Sease and Scott Dempsey, and drummer John Barry. Miller departed quickly thereafter, with McCarty taking over vocals as well as bass. The four would record some material, with Chris McLane taking over bass duties. McCarty would leave the band, with McLane taking over vocals and Donnie Raines joining the band on bass. The band would release their debut album, Compassion Fills the Void, with Shawn Williams of Prevail on bass. After their first release on Uprising Records, Compassion Fills the Void, the band would sign with Solid State Records, consisting of the lineup of McLane, Sease, Dempsey, Barry, and Jeremy Jeffers on bass.

In 1999, the band recorded their sophomore album, Rituals of Life, which saw their debut on Solid State Records. With the album out, the band released a music video for their song "Second Chances". In 2001, the band began writing and recording their third album, which would be titled A Revolution Transmission. In 2003, the band released Engage, which would be their third and final album with Solid State and their fourth studio album, which was well received. Stretch Arm Strong signed to We Put Out Records, a label on East West (an imprint of the Warner Music Group), having fulfilled their deal with Solid State. Their most recent album, Free at Last, was recorded in April and May 2005 with James Paul Wisner and released late that same year. A video for the song "The Sound of Names Dropping" was released that year. In 2005, the band shared the stage with the famed funk musician George Clinton.

They have mostly been inactive since 2005, reuniting in 2009 for a few benefit shows with Evergreen Terrace and Bane and for a one-off show at Within These Walls in 2011. The band is set to reunite for Furnace Fest in 2021.

In early 2022, Stretch Arm Strong announced that they had partnered with Iodine Recordings to re-issue "Rituals of Life" and other titles from their catalog. The band also alluded to writing new music.

== Members ==
Current members

- Chris McLane – vocals (1995–2011, 2020–present), bass (1994–1995)
- David Sease – guitar (1992–2011, 2020–present)
- John Barry – drums (1992–2011, 2020–present)
- Scott Dempsey – guitar (1992–2004, 2011, 2020–present)
- Jeremy Jeffers – bass (1997–2006, 2011, 2020–present), guitar (2004–2006)

Former members

- Matt McCarty – bass (1992–1994), vocals (1992–1995)
- James Miller – vocals (1992)
- Donnie Raines – bass (1995–1996)
- Shawn Williams – bass (1996–1997)
- Juan Carlos "JC" Lopez – guitar (2004–2006)
- Glen Calder – guitar (2006–2010)
- Chris Andrews – bass (2006–2010)

Touring members

- Jonathan Rej – bass (2000)
- Sean McGuckin – bass (2006)

Timeline

== Discography ==
Studio albums

- Compassion Fills the Void (1998, Uprising Records)
- Rituals of Life (1999, Solid State Records)
- A Revolution Transmission (2001, Solid State Records)
- Engage (2003, Solid State Records)
- Free at Last (2005, We Put Out Records)

Studio EPs

- Not Without Resistance (1995, Insurgent Sounds Records)
- It Burns Clean EP (2000, Reflections Records)
- The Revealing (2024, Iodine Recordings)

Splits

- Bedlam Hour / Stretch Arm Strong Split (1993, Insurgent Sounds Records/Koogle Records)
- Forget the Differences (1996, Insurgent Sounds Records)
- I Stand Alone (2000, I Stand Alone Records; split with xDISCIPLEx A.D.)
