= Stretch Armstrong (ska band) =

American ska band

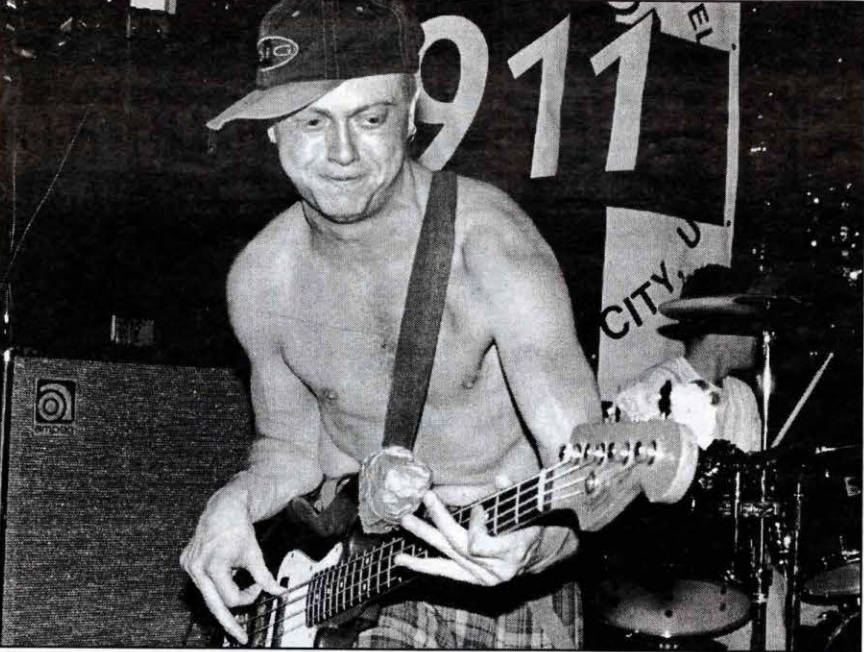
- Bassist Darren Hutchison

Background information
- Origin: Provo, Utah U.S.
- Genres: Ska punk; two-tone; Circus music; Swing revival
- Years active: 1990–1997
- Past members: Scott Van Wagenen; Gordon Cobb; Chris Thomas; Kyle McBride; Paul Browning; Hyrum; Robb Enger; Steve Ricks; Amie Cobabe Cobb; Chris Brady; Darren Hutchison; Deidre Rodman Struck; Curtis McKendrick; Dave Thomas; Joe Freeman; Rachelle Powell; Lamont Lee; Mike South; Dan Nelson; Ryan Ridges; Brian Rowley; Sterling Acomb

Stretch Armstrong was a popular third-wave ska band from Provo, Utah. Formed in 1990, Scott Van Wagenen, the lead singer, was the main constant in the band's initially oft-changing lineup. By 1994, the lineup had settled on Darren Hutchison (bass), Dave Thomas (drums), Mike South (guitar), Dan Nelson (sax), Ryan Ridges (keyboard), Brian Rowley (sax), and Sterling Acomb (sax). Their ska music included elements of punk, jazz, and circus music. Their concerts were full of energetic dancing and moshing.

Riding on the coattails of Swim Herschel Swim's success in the Provo ska scene, Stretch Armstrong opened for national bands soon after their formation: Skankin' Pickle, The Mighty Mighty Bosstones, The Special Beat, and the Crazy 8s. In 1993, they released Old School and opened for Buck-O-Nine and Bad Manners. They released an album in each subsequent year: Lollygag (1994), The Lesser of the Two Weevils EP (1995), and Armstrong (1996). Combined, their four albums sold over 20,000 copies. In later years, they played in concerts with national acts like Skankin' Pickle, Let's Go Bowling, The Aquabats, Black Uhuru, and Cake. They opened for Fishbone and No Doubt in 1995. Brandon Smith, director of the documentary on Utah ska called The Up Beat, said that the band was a scene leader following Swim Herschel Swim's breakup. Stretch Armstrong broke up in 1997.

== Founding and early concerts ==
Logo

The band, based in Provo, Utah, started playing together in December 1990. Scott Van Wagenen, the lead singer, had no previous singing experience. Van Wagenen recalled trying to write ska and ska-funk music, but said that their efforts to make music in those genres were unsuccessful, and that they were more successful than they deserved to be.

Stretch Armstrong opened for the Specs and local acts Jonesin' and Swim Herschel Swim in 1991. Stretch Armstrong opened in the first Skalapalooza concert in 1992, which featured Swim Herschel Swim and national bands Skankin' Pickle and The Mighty Mighty Bosstones. The concert had over 1,100 attendees. In later concerts that year, they opened for The Crazy 8s and The Special Beat, along with Swim Herschel Swim at the Ventura Film Studio. In a review of the Ventura Film Studio concert, Jeff Vice said that Stretch Armstrong was "melding again" after several changes to their lineup. By June 1993, they had also opened for Buck-O-Nine and Bad Manners.

=== Energetic concerts ===
Stretch Armstrong became known for their "maniacally energetic live shows". Rick Anderson, guitarist for Swim Herschel Swim, mentioned Stretch Armstrong as "Provo's most energetic band" in his "On Music" column for The Daily Herald in April 1991. In a review of the Buck O'Nine concert, Scott Vice praised the group's dancing in "Borisoglebaska" and its succession of fast-paced songs. Of their performance opening for The Skankin' Pickle, Vice noticed that audience members were "skanking and dancing up a storm" and that the band poured their "heart and soul" into the performance. In a review of an April 1993 concert, Vice mentioned how Van Wagenen "cavorted around the stage". A concert-goer from 1994 complained about the moshing. The dancing at a 1994 concert was full of the high energy "that most aerobics programs strive for".

== Old School and Lollygag ==
Stretch Armstrong released their first album, Old School, on cassette in 1993. Writing for SLUG magazine, Scott Vice praised the debut album, stating "there are no stinkers on the tape". The opening song, "Pain", featured "classic ska instrumentals". Hammond Chamberlain Brian Ibbott featured "Skeleton" on his podcast Soundography and complimented the horn section in the song.

Stretch Armstrong celebrated the release of Lollygag (1994) at the first Skalloween concert in 1994. The Skalloween concert series was founded by Corey Fox and Terry Xanthos. Lollygag sold over 10,000 copies by 1997. "Drool" from the album was aired frequently on radio station X96. Jimmy Thompson, lead singer for My Man Friday, recalled that Stretch Armstrong enjoyed plentiful airplay from X-96 around the time of the release of Lollygag, "for some obscure reason". Van Wagenen wrote the lyrics for all of the songs on the album except for "Home and a Crackhouse", which had lyrics by Darren Hutchison. The music was credited to the entire band in the album's credits.

== Concerts 1994–1995 ==
Xanthos organized a spring break "lollapolooza-type concert" festival at the new Tuacahn Amphitheater near St. George, which included Stretch Armstrong. Stretch Armstrong headlined for the 1994 Southern Utah University Winterfest and performed with Ali Ali Oxen Free. According to a review of the concert by Jennifer Durcan, the concert "wasn't the best", but it was refreshingly different from other music in Cedar City. Durcan's main complaint was the moshing at the concert. By April 1994, Stretch Armstrong's lineup had expanded to include three saxophones. Stretch Armstrong performed in August 1994 at a Great Xpectations II concert, which featured Machines of Loving Grace, Sunny Day Real Estate, Lucy's Fur Coat, Cradle of Thorns, Mexico 70, and Agnes Poetry. In November 1994, Stretch Armstrong performed at a concert with Disco Drippers, Primitive Painters, and James Stewart to benefit Scott Bringard, a guitarist for Commonplace who had recently been diagnosed with cancer.

Stretch Armstrong opened for The Offspring and Guttermouth in January 1995. In 1995, they performed for Ska Patrick's Day where they opened with Skankin' Pickle for Let's Go Bowling. Soda Jerks and the Aquabats also performed at the Ska Patrick's Day concert. In a review of the show, Mandy Brown described their sound as "carnival swing" and noted that many of the audience members were fans. Stretch Armstrong opened for Let's Go Bowling for at least three other concerts. The LDS Student Association sponsored a concert where Stretch Armstrong performed in 1995. In a review of the concert, Beckstead said the band was "trying too hard to entertain". Mayfest was organized by the Associated Students of the University of Utah (ASUU) in May 1995. Stretch Armstrong opened for the Wednesday Mayday festival. They were followed by Cake, jazz trio Medeski, Martin, and Wood, Salt Licks, Renegade Saints, Fat Paw, The Strangers, Big Leg, and Black Uhuru. In a May 1995 performance, they performed with Toasters, Let's Go Bowling, and Insatiable on a "Moonstomp Ska Tour".

In their August 1995 performance at the X-96 Bash Show, reviewer Pete Weiland reported that "ska-crazy" dancers were in a "frenzy" and that three people left on stretchers and one in a hospital helicopter. Other acts at the Bash Show were Cake, Everclear, Wax, Gwen Mars, Howard Jones, and Bush. Stretch Armstrong opened for No Doubt in one concert and for Fishbone in another concert in November 1995.

== The Lesser of Two Weevils and Armstrong ==
Stretch Armstrong released an EP called The Lesser of Two Weevils in 1995. In a 2018 podcast episode of Soundography, Hammond Chamberlain listed Stretch Armstrong's cover of "Charlie Brown" as one of his favorite ska covers.

Stretch Armstrong released their third studio album, Armstrong, at a Halloween release party concert in 1996. The lyrics were written by Van Wagenen, with the exception of "About Time", which had lyrics by Darren Hutchison.

== Concerts 1996–1997 ==
They opened for The Specials on June 26, 1996. They competed in a South by Southwest contest, which Salsa Brava won. Writing for The Daily Utah Chronicle, Shan Fowler praised Salsa Brava's talent, but lamented that they did not represent Utah's unique music scene. Stretch Armstrong played a January 1997 concert with groups Lopez and Model Citizen on the same day that Insatiable had a concert, causing Vice to comment on their friendly rivalry. They played a 1997 benefit concert to raise funds to restore Provo's Academy Square with Paradigm, My Man Friday, and soloist John Kavanaugh.

== Breakup and later concerts ==
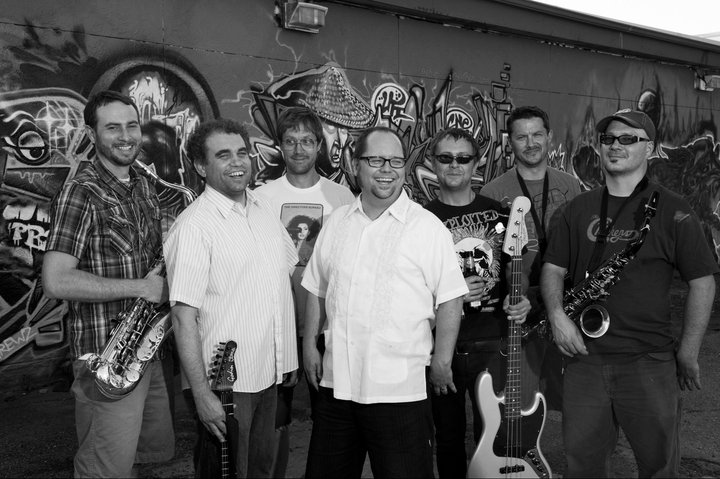
Stretch Armstrong during their 2014 reunion

Stretch Armstrong sold over 20,000 copies combined of their four albums, one of which was released as a cassette and the other three as CDs. Lead singer Van Wagenen said that the band didn't pursue signing with a record label because he didn't see touring as a good way to make money or raise a family. The band broke up in December 1997.

Stretch Armstrong was included on the album Send Help: The Utah Ska Compilation. They played a reunion Skalloween concert in October 2002 with My Man Friday and planned to release a live album and concert video from the performance. They played at Albee Square in 2003. They played another reunion concert with Swim Herschel Swim, Insatiable, and Two and a Half White Guys on July 14, 2012.

== Influences and musical style ==
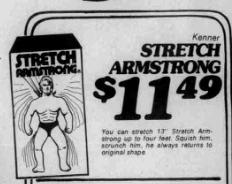
Ad for a Stretch Armstrong toy, after which the band is named

Stretch Armstrong was influenced by the Mighty Mighty Bosstones, Fishbone, Elvis Costello, and Swim Herschel Swim, an earlier popular ska band in Utah. In their early years, Stretch Armstrong frequently opened for Swim Herschel Swim and national ska acts, a beneficial relationship for Stretch Armstrong. The band is named after the popular toy from the 1970s. When the toy was re-released in 1993, the band shortened their name to "Stretch" to avoid trademark infringement. They were also known as "Stretsch Armstrong", "Stretch Magnifico", "Strëtsch Armströnng", and "The Stretch Band".

Writing at City Weekly, Portia Early described their music as "jocular ska pop". Chris Robing and Scott Vice said that their songs had psychedelia influences and remained "most faithful to England's two-tone movement". Drummer Dave Thomas said they were influenced by Oingo Boingo, Fishbone, Huey Luis, and Descendents. In 1996, Van Wagenen said their music was a blend of "ska, swing, punk, "New Wave" pop and carnival sounds". Jeff Vice at The Deseret News summarized Stretch Armstrong's genres as "punk, pop, and jazz". Thomas said that stylistically, the band was a "fringe-dweller in the ska world" because of their swing and circus music elements. At The Daily Chronicle, Christian Arial described their genre as "funk 'n' punk ska".

== Legacy ==
In a feature on ska for The Daily Utah Chronicle, Lonica Smith listed Stretch Armstrong and Insatiable as Utah ska bands contributing to the third wave of ska. Jeff Evans, an instrumentalist and vocalist for Insatiable, cited Stretch as a local influence on their music. Brandon Smith, the director of the Utah ska documentary The Up Beat, said that Stretch Armstrong was a "scene leader" following Swim Herschel Swim's popularity, a distinction that they passed onto My Man Friday after their breakup.

== Members ==
Data for this timeline come from the Stretch Armstrong Facebook page. Credits for individual albums come from the credits sections of those albums.

Stretch Armstrong lineups
1993 Old School	Darren Hutchison – bass guitar; Rachelle Jessee – saxophone, vocals; Mr. Lee – trombone; Curtis McKendrick – trumpet; Ryan Ridges – keyboards; Mike South – guitar; Jeffery McFerson – trombone; Dave Thomas – percussion; Scott Van Wagenen – lead vocals
1994 Lollygag	Ryan Ridges – keyboards; Mr. Karin A. Thomas – green drums; Darren Hutchison – bass fiddle and vocals; Mike South – guitar; Brian Rowley – tenor sax; Dan Nelson – alto sax; Sterling Acomb – bari sax; Scott Van Wagenen – lead vocal
1995 The Lesser of the Two Weevils	Sterling Acomb – baritone sax; Darren Hutchison – bass, singing; Dan Nelson – alto sax; Ryan Ridges – keyboard; Brian Rowley – tenor sax; Terry M. South – guitar, singing; Mr. Karin A. Thomas – drums, singing; R. Scott Van Wagenen – lead singing
1996 Armstrong	Sterling Acomb – large sax; Brian Rowley – medium sax, soprano sax; Dan Nelson – small sax, accordion; Ryan Ridges – keyboards; Dave Thomas – drums; Darren Hutchison – bass; Mike South – guitar; Scott Van Wagenen – vocals

== Band member projects after Stretch Armstrong ==
After Stretch Armstrong's breakup, Van Wagenen, South, Nelson, and Acomb joined a few other musicians to form the Moxie Tonic Medicine Show. The 10-piece big band incorporated variety show acts into their performances. Jessica Christiansen and Lucy Campbell described them as "Salt Lake's best swing show" when they opened for The Cherry Poppin' Daddies in 1998.

Nate Robinson played as the drummer in My Man Friday and Stretch Armstrong. He was also in the reggae trio Two and a Half White Guys along with Nelson. Robinson was also in the Nate Robinson Trio. Two and a Half White Guys signed with Megalith Records. They toured and recorded four albums for Megalith. Their fifth album was released independently. They performed at the 2004 Skalloween concert—their fourth Skalloween concert. In 2011, Nelson led an afrobeat/funk/jazz band called The Chickens. Acton and Hutchison play with the 80s "knotty" pop band Purr Bats.
