= We Put Out Records =

Record Company

We Put Out Records is a record company that started as a vehicle for The Syndicate to release music from friends' bands that were without a record label.

The Syndicate began as a radio promotion company but soon branched out into street marketing and artist management. The management side works with Shadows Fall, Thursday (both Top 20 acts), Murder by Death and Stretch Arm Strong.

WPO released three records before going dormant for a few years. After years of assisting other labels in marketing their artists, The Syndicate decided to seek out a distribution partner and restart the label. Upon striking a deal with indie distributor, Alternative Distribution Alliance, We Put Out Records was born again as a full-time label with a dedicated staff.

The band Stretch Arm Strong recorded the first release for the revamped WPO Records, Free at Last.

We Put Out Records is a label in the East West family of labels. East West is a branch of the Warner Music Group.

== Bands ==
- God Forbid
- The North Atlantic
- Stretch Arm Strong
- Mustache
- The Step Kings
- Cropduster

== Past Bands ==
- Patent Pending

== See also ==
- List of record labels
