= 2014 in American music =

The following is a list of notable events and releases that happened in 2014 in music in the United States.

== Events ==
=== January ===
- 26 – The 56th Annual Grammy Awards, hosted by LL Cool J took place at the Staples Center in Los Angeles, California. Daft Punk won 5 awards, including Album of the Year for Random Access Memories and Record of the Year for "Get Lucky".
- 28 – Mötley Crüe signed a "Cessation of Tour" agreement which will see them retire after a final world tour ending in 2015.

=== February ===
- 2 – Soprano Renée Fleming makes history as the first opera singer to perform the National Anthem at the Super Bowl. Bruno Mars performs during the halftime show, with an appearance from the Red Hot Chili Peppers.
- 4 – Transatlantic release their first album in five years, Kaleidoscope.
- 25 – As I Lay Dying lead singer Tim Lambesis pleads guilty to felony solicitation of murder after attempting to hire a hitman to kill his estranged ex-wife.
- Whole February – Katy Perry tops the US Billboard Hot 100 with her song "Dark Horse", which overtakes Madonna in the most weeks at No. 1, and ties with Janet Jackson.

=== March ===
- 23 – Dave Brockie (also known as Oderus Urungus), lead singer of Gwar, died from an accidental overdose. After his public memorial in August, his character's infamous costume received a Viking funeral at Haddad's Lake in Gwar's hometown of Richmond, Virginia. The band reformed, resumed touring, and began ending their sets with a revised cover of Jim Carroll's punk classic, "People Who Died."
- 27 – Christine McVie rejoined Fleetwood Mac for first time in sixteen years.

=== April ===
- 1 – Nickel Creek released their first album in nine years, A Dotted Line.
- 6 – The Academy of Country Music Awards took place in Las Vegas.
- 10 – The 2014 Rock and Roll Hall of Fame took place. Nirvana, Kiss, Peter Gabriel, Hall & Oates, Cat Stevens and Linda Ronstadt were inducted at the ceremony.
- 22 – Actor and musician Drake Bell released his first album in eight years, Ready Steady Go!.

=== May ===
- 5 – Following the 2014 Met Gala in New York City at an after-party at The Standard, High Line, Solange Knowles attacks Jay-Z by violently punching him in the face followed by kicking and swinging him and even hitting him with her purse. Video footage which was obtained by TMZ was made public on May 12, 2014.
- May 13 – Michael Jackson's second posthumous album of previously unreleased tracks, Xscape, was released. Jackson and Justin Timberlake's duet "Love Never Felt So Good" was announced as the official lead single.
- 17 – Saosin performed at the Skate and Surf festival with their original lead vocalist, Anthony Green (who is also Circa Survive's frontman). This was the first time Green had performed with Saosin since departing in 2004 to form Circa Survive.
- 20 – Josh Kaufman is crowned winner of the sixth season of The Voice, with Jake Worthington and Christina Grimmie finishing runner-up and third place respectively.
- 21 – Caleb Johnson is crowned winner of the thirteenth season of American Idol while Jena Irene is named the runner-up.

=== August ===
- 13 – After being with the band for 17 years, guitarist Chris Walla leaves Death Cab for Cutie.
- 24 – The MTV Video Music Awards took place at the Inglewood Forum in Inglewood, California. Beyoncé wins four awards that night and also received the Michael Jackson Video Vanguard Award, presented to her by her husband Jay Z and her daughter Blue Ivy.

=== September ===
- 2 – Counting Crows released Somewhere Under Wonderland, their first album of original material in six years.
- 16 – Chris Brown comes back with the release of his sixth studio album, X and for the sixth time makes the top 10.
- 23 – Lady Gaga and Tony Bennett release their collaborative album, Cheek to Cheek, with them being 28 and 88 years old respectively, it marks the highest age-gap through a collaborative album of 60 years.
- 30 – Finch releases Back to Oblivion, their first studio album in nine years, following a series of disbandings and reunions.

=== October ===
- 20 – Gwen Stefani releases her comeback single as a solo artist, "Baby Don't Lie".
- 21 – Slipknot released their first album in six years, .5: The Gray Chapter.
- 27 – Taylor Swift releases her fifth studio album, 1989, which debuted at number one with 1,287,000 copies sold in its first week. This is the highest debut sales week for an artist since Eminem's 2002 album The Eminem Show and the second highest debut for a female artist, behind Britney Spears' album Oops!... I Did It Again (2000).
- 28 – Live releases The Turn, their first studio album in eight years and also their only studio album to feature Chris Shinn on lead vocals.

=== November ===
- 1 – Just three days before his 49th birthday, Static-X frontman Wayne Static was found dead in his sleep.
- 10 – Taylor Swift released "Blank Space", the second single from her successful 1989. "Blank Space" reached number one in November, ending the run of Swift's own "Shake It Off". In doing so, Swift became the first female artist in the history of the Hot 100, and tenth act overall, to replace herself at the top of the chart. With "Shake It Off" and "Blank Space", Swift was also the only artist to notch multiple number-ones in 2014.
- 23 – The American Music Awards took place in Los Angeles.

=== December ===
- 15 – TLC releases their first single in nine years called "Gift Wrapped Kiss".
- 16 – Craig Wayne Boyd is crowned winner of the 7th season of The Voice, with Matt McAndrew, Chris Jamison and Damien finishing runner-up, third place and fourth place respectively.

== Bands formed ==
- Antemasque
- American Wrestlers
- Cafuné
- Cheat Codes
- FFS
- Hot Mulligan
- Maddie & Tae
- Michigander
- No Devotion
- Oso Oso
- Saint Asonia
- Sheer Mag
- Slaves
- Sofi Tukker
- Soul Glo
- The Walters
- You+Me

== Bands reformed ==
- Aiden
- American Football
- Atreyu
- Babes In Toyland
- Breaking Benjamin
- Copeland
- Deep Dish
- Design the Skyline
- Erase Errata
- Failure
- From Autumn to Ashes
- Haste the Day
- L7
- Luna
- The Matches
- Metro Station
- Midtown
- Mineral
- The Movielife
- Nickel Creek
- OutKast
- Ride
- Saosin
- Sleater-Kinney
- Trick Pony

== Bands on hiatus ==
- As I Lay Dying
- Darkside
- Dredg
- Foxy Shazam
- Furthur
- The Wanted
- White Rabbits
- Yeah Yeah Yeahs

== Bands disbanded ==
- Abandon All Ships
- The Allman Brothers Band
- Anberlin
- As Blood Runs Black
- Austrian Death Machine
- Beady Eye
- Beneath the Sky
- The Blackout
- Bleeding Through
- Bomb the Music Industry!
- Brown Bird
- Camp Freddy
- Chimaira
- The Civil Wars
- Clipse
- Company of Thieves
- Crystal Castles
- Danity Kane
- The Dangerous Summer
- Death Grips
- Eleventyseven
- For All Those Sleeping
- Guided by Voices
- The Knife
- Lestat
- LFO
- The Luchagors
- Morning Parade
- The Move
- Nachtmystium
- Pink Floyd
- The Rapture
- Richard Cheese and Lounge Against the Machine
- Rob Base and DJ E-Z Rock
- Smith Westerns
- The Swellers
- Ten Second Epic
- There for Tomorrow
- Vista Chino
- Vivian Girls

== Albums released ==
=== January ===
Day	Title	Artist	Genre(s)
7	And I'll Scratch Yours	Various Artists	Progressive rock
7	My Own Lane	Kid Ink	Hip hop
7	Wig Out at Jagbags	Stephen Malkmus and the Jicks	Indie rock; alternative rock
14	The River & the Thread	Rosanne Cash	Country
14	The Crystal Method	The Crystal Method	Electronica; dubstep; breakbeat
14	Kidz Bop 25	Kidz Bop Kids	Children's; pop
14	That Girl	Jennifer Nettles	Country
14	Write You a Song	Jon Pardi	Country
14	Give the People What They Want	Sharon Jones & the Dap-Kings	Soul; funk
14	About Last Night	Sleeper Agent	Alternative rock
14	High Hopes	Bruce Springsteen	Rock; alternative rock; funk rock
14	Angels + Animals	Ryan Star	Rock; indie rock
14	Get the Hell	The Supersuckers	Rock
14	Fading West	Switchfoot	Alternative rock; pop
21	Is There Anybody Out There?	A Great Big World	Indie pop; indie rock
21	Transgender Dysphoria Blues	Against Me!	Punk rock; alternative rock
21	Bad Things	Bad Things	Indie pop; alternative rock; indie rock
21	Goodnight Tender	Amy Ray	Folk rock
21	Beach House EP	Ty Dolla Sign	R&B; hip hop
21	Mind over Matter	Young the Giant	Indie rock; alternative rock
28	Golden Days	Dave Barnes	Rock
28	Thrive	Casting Crowns	Christian; Christian rock; worship
28	Too True	Dum Dum Girls	Indie pop
28	Ready to Fly	Jamie Grace	Christian; Christian hip hop; R&B
28	Restoring Force	Of Mice & Men	Metalcore; Nu metal
28	Clear	Periphery	Progressive metal; alternative metal
28	Neon Icon	Riff Raff	Hip hop

=== February ===
Day	Title	Artist	Genre(s)
4	Love, Marriage & Divorce	Toni Braxton & Babyface	R&B; pop; soul
4	After the Disco	Broken Bells	Indie rock; space rock; alternative rock
4	Fight the Silence	For Today	Metalcore
4	Junior Prom (EP)	Junior Prom	Indie pop; alternative rock
4	Kin (<-->)	Pat Metheny Unity Group	Jazz
4	Eric Paslay	Eric Paslay	Country
7	Make a Shadow (EP)	Meg Myers	Pop rock
11	Sunshine & Whiskey	Frankie Ballard	Country
11	The Outsiders	Eric Church	Country; Southern rock
11	Love Death Immortality	The Glitch Mob	Glitch
11	Small Town Heroes	Hurray for the Riff Raff	Folk; indie rock
11	I Was Going to Be an Astronaut	Greg Laswell	Indie rock
11	Benji	Sun Kil Moon	Folk rock
11	In This Life	Elise Testone	Rock; blues
14	Kudos to You!	The Presidents of the United States of America	Alternative rock
18	Cult	Bayside	Punk rock; pop punk
18	Distraction	Bear Hands	Experimental rock; indie rock; alternative rock
18	Barefoot and Pregnant	The Dollyrots	Pop punk
18	Peace Kehd	The Doppelgangaz	Hip hop
18	Music Speaks	Candice Glover	R&B; soul
18	Motivational Jumpsuit	Guided by Voices	Indie rock
18	Issues	Issues	Metalcore; nu metal
18	Voices	Phantogram	Indie pop; trip hop; electronica
18	Weird Kids	We Are the In Crowd	Pop punk; pop rock; alternative rock
25	Morning Phase	Beck	Alternative rock; folk rock; country rock
25	Riser	Dierks Bentley	Country
25	Love Songs, Werewolves, & Zombies	The Dollyrots	Acoustic; punk rock
25	Helios	The Fray	Alternative rock; pop rock
25	Oxymoron	Schoolboy Q	West Coast hip hop; gangsta rap
25	Manhattan	Skaters	Alternative rock
25	St. Vincent	St. Vincent	Art rock; indie rock

=== March ===
Day	Title	Artist	Genre(s)
3	TV en Français	We Are Scientists	Indie rock
3	Girl	Pharrell Williams	Neo soul; soul; funk
4	Oh, What a Life	American Authors	Indie rock
4	BraveHeart	Ashanti	R&B
4	10,000 Towns	Eli Young Band	Country
4	Puppet Strings	Fuel	Hard rock
4	Louder	Lea Michele	Pop; vocal
4	I'm a Fire	David Nail	Country
4	Mastermind	Rick Ross	Hip hop
4	Push Rewind	Chris Wallace	Pop
11	Stereolithic	311	Alternative rock; reggae rock; rap rock; funk metal
11	Lift Your Spirit	Aloe Blacc	Pop; R&B; soul
11	Slow Me Down	Sara Evans	Country
11	The Truth	Ledisi	R&B; neo soul; soul
11	Young Money: Rise of an Empire	Young Money Entertainment	Hip hop
18	Supermodel	Foster the People	Indie pop; alternative rock; neo-phychedelia
18	Piñata	Freddie Gibbs & Madlib	Hip hop
18	Sex and Love	Enrique Iglesias	Latin pop; electropop
18	Me	Jo Dee Messina	Country
18	Summer #17	Ronnie Milsap	Country; gospel
18	Going to Hell	The Pretty Reckless	Alternative rock; hard rock
18	Happiness Is	Taking Back Sunday	Alternative rock
18	My Krazy Life	YG	West Coast hip hop
18	Recess	Skrillex	Electronica
24	Singles	Future Islands	Alternative; new wave; indie pop
25	Out Among the Stars	Johnny Cash	Country
25	The Colourist	The Colourist	Indie pop; power pop
25	Teeth Dreams	The Hold Steady	Indie rock
25	Pulses	Karmin	Pop; dance-pop; hip hop
25	Unconditional	Memphis May Fire	Metalcore
25	May Death Never Stop You	My Chemical Romance	Alternative rock
25	About Last Night	Sleeper Agent	Alternative rock

=== April ===
Day	Title	Artist	Genre(s)
1	La Gárgola	Chevelle	Alternative metal
1	Devil	Chiodos	Post-hardcore; emo
1	Here and Nowhere Else	Cloud Nothings	Indie rock; garage rock
1	Where It All Began	Dan + Shay	Country
1	Cope	Manchester Orchestra	Indie rock; alternative rock
1	MKTO	MKTO	Teen pop; pop rap
1	The Infamous Mobb Deep	Mobb Deep	Hip hop
1	Head or Heart	Christina Perri	Pop; alternative rock; indie rock
1	Imaginary Enemy	The Used	Alternative rock; post-hardcore
2	Gonzo	Foxy Shazam	Progressive rock; alternative rock
8	Celebrate	James Durbin	Pop rock
8	Everlasting	Martina McBride	Soul; country; pop
8	Love & Hate	Joan Osborne	Rock
8	SoMo	SoMo	R&B
15	Savages	Breathe Carolina	Electropop
15	Talk Dirty	Jason Derulo	R&B; hip hop; pop
15	Quack	Duck Sauce	Disco house; nu-disco; house
15	Lights Out	Ingrid Michaelson	Indie pop
15	Rivers in the Wasteland	Needtobreathe	Alternative rock; Christian rock; folk rock; indie rock; southern rock
15	Testimony	August Alsina	R&B; hip hop
19	Demolicious	Green Day	Pop punk; alternative rock; garage rock
19	Indie Cindy	Pixies	Alternative rock
22	Rented World	The Menzingers	Punk rock; indie rock
22	Pop Psychology	Neon Trees	Pop; pop rock; new wave
22	Ready Steady Go!	Drake Bell	Rockabilly; rock and roll; classic rock; pop
22	RetroHash	Asher Roth	Hip hop
22	Modern Creation	The Whigs	Garage rock; indie rock
27	Arcadia	Ramona Lisa	Electronic
28	Food	Kelis	R&B; soul
29	Midnight Sun	The Ghost of a Saber Tooth Tiger	Folk; psychedelic pop
29	After Hours	Timeflies	R&B; hip hop; pop
29	Shriek	Wye Oak	Indie pop; indie rock

=== May ===
Day	Title	Artist	Genre(s)
5	AEGEA	Billy Corgan	Experimental rock
5	Nikki Nack	Tune-Yards	Art pop; synth-pop
6	Southsiders	Atmosphere	Hip hop
6	Storyline	Hunter Hayes	Country
6	Supernova	Ray LaMontagne	Folk; folk rock
6	Natalie Merchant	Natalie Merchant	Folk; alternative
6	Corazón	Santana	Latin rock
6	Strangeulation	Tech N9ne Collabos	Hip hop
12	Sylvan Esso	Sylvan Esso	Electropop; indie pop; indie rock
13	Unrepentant Geraldines	Tori Amos	Alternative rock; baroque pop
13	Turn Blue	The Black Keys	Blues rock; garage rock; indie rock; soul
13	Ghosts of Download	Blondie	Dance-pop; pop; disco; electropop
13	Are We Not Men? We Are Diva!	Me First and the Gimme Gimmes	Punk rock
13	Blue Smoke	Dolly Parton	Country
13	Rewind	Rascal Flatts	Country
13	To Be Kind	Swans	Experimental rock; art rock
13	Ultima II Massage	TOBACCO	Electronic
14	Tree of Stars (EP)	Failure	Alternative rock; space rock
19	Just as I Am	Brantley Gilbert	Country
19	Cool Planet	Guided By Voices	
19	Behind the Light	Phillip Phillips	Pop rock; folk rock
20	The Silence in Black and White Acoustic	Hawthorne Heights	Acoustic
27	Me. I Am Mariah... The Elusive Chanteuse	Mariah Carey	Pop; R&B
27	Xscape	Michael Jackson	Pop
27	The Secret	Austin Mahone	Pop; R&B
27	Big Skies	Nick Santino	Country rock; indie pop
27	Clouded	This Wild Life	Acoustic rock; emo

=== June ===
Day	Title	Artist	Genre(s)
3	Animal Ambition	50 Cent	Hip hop
3	Road Between	Lucy Hale	Country
3	Platinum	Miranda Lambert	Country
3	Akeda	Matisyahu	Pop; reggae
3	Beauty & Ruin	Bob Mould	Alternative rock
3	Till Death Do Us Party	Adore Delano	Dance
3	Black Hours	Hamilton Leithauser	Chamber pop; rock and roll
3	Sing Pray Love, Vol. 1: Sing	Kelly Price	R&B
5	French Exit	TV Girl	Indie pop
10	Disgusting	Beartooth	Metalcore; Hardcore punk
10	Stockholm	Chrissie Hynde	Rock
10	While You Were Sleeping	José James	Jazz; hip hop
10	The Rockville LP	O.A.R.	Rock; pop rock
10	Hebrews	Say Anything	Indie rock; alternative rock; emo
10	Lazaretto	Jack White	Blues rock; folk rock; blue-eyed soul
17	Ultraviolence	Lana Del Rey	Dream pop; psychedelic rock; desert rock
17	The Hunting Party	Linkin Park	Rock; alternative rock; hard rock; rap metal
17	A.K.A.	Jennifer Lopez	Pop; synthpop
24	Language & Perspective	Bad Suns	Alternative rock; indie rock
24	Fuego	Phish	Rock
24	Phox	Phox	Indie pop
24	Nothing More	Nothing More	Rock; Alternative metal; hard rock; progressive metal
24	Relief	Vacationer	Electropop; dream pop

=== July ===
Day	Title	Artist	Genre(s)
1	Careers	Beverly	Indie rock; indie pop
1	Thanks for Listening	Colt Ford	Country rap
1	Paula	Robin Thicke	R&B
1	Trigga	Trey Songz	R&B
4	Chicago XXXVI: Now	Chicago	Rock
4	4	The Red Jumpsuit Apparatus	Alternative rock; Christian rock; emo; post-hardcore; metalcore; pop punk
8	Feathers & Bones	The Clarks	Rock
8	Sound of Change	Dirty Heads	Reggae; rock; hip hop
8	Fall for You	Leela James	R&B; soul
8	TIME	Mr.Kitty	Synth-pop; New wave music
15	Strange Desire	Bleachers	Alternative rock
15	Yes!	Jason Mraz	Pop rock
15	The Black Market	Rise Against	Punk rock; melodic hardcore
15	Mandatory Fun	"Weird Al" Yankovic	Comedy; parody
22	Lowborn	Anberlin	Alternative rock; Christian alternative rock
22	Nobody Smiling	Common	Hip hop
22	Do You Wanna Start a War	Fozzy	Heavy metal; hard rock
22	I Remember	Kaskade	Dance; progressive house
22	In Technicolor	Jesse McCartney	Pop
22	Maybe This Place Is the Same and We're Just Changing	Real Friends	Pop punk; emo
29	A Life Worth Living	Marc Broussard	R&B; Pop rock
29	Please Return the Evening – the Cherry Poppin' Daddies Salute the Music of the Rat Pack	Cherry Poppin' Daddies	Swing; traditional pop
29	Lese Majesty	Shabazz Palaces	Experimental hip hop
29	Hypnotic Eye	Tom Petty and the Heartbreakers	Rock

=== August ===
Day	Title	Artist	Genre(s)
5	Time Is Over One Day Old	Bear in Heaven	Electronic rock; indie rock
5	The Empty Hearts	The Empty Hearts	Garage rock; rock and roll
5	1000hp	Godsmack	Alternative metal; hard rock
5	Magazines or Novels	Andy Grammer	Pop rock
5	The Interrupters	The Interrupters	Ska punk; punk rock
5	Summer Nationals (EP)	The Offspring	Punk rock
5	Worlds	Porter Robinson	Synthpop; indietronica; alternative dance
5	They Want My Soul	Spoon	Indie rock; art rock; alternative rock
5	Provoked	Sunny Sweeney	Country
12	Horizons	Kris Allen	Pop rock
12	Testify	Caleb Johnson	Rock
12	Stronger	Tank	R&B
12	Rockabilly Riot!: All Original	Brian Setzer	Rockabilly
15	I'll Bring the Music	Keith Anderson	Country
19	Anchor	Colton Dixon	CCM; alternative rock
19	Get Hurt	The Gaslight Anthem	Rock; alternative rock
19	Blacc Hollywood	Wiz Khalifa	Hip hop
19	Ignite the Night	Chase Rice	Country
19	I Will Not Be Afraid	Caroline Rose	Indie pop; indie rock
25	L.O.R.D.	ASAP Mob	Hip hop
25	Stomachaches	frnkiero and the cellabration	Alternative rock; post-hardcore
25	My Everything	Ariana Grande	Pop; R&B
25	Lost in Alphaville	The Rentals	New wave
25	Manipulator	Ty Segall	Psychedelic rock; garage rock; glam rock
26	Moonshine in the Trunk	Brad Paisley	Country

=== September ===
Day	Title	Artist	Genre(s)
2	Seen It All: The Autobiography	Jeezy	Hip hop
2	The Turn	Amber Pacific	Pop punk
2	Hold On Pain Ends	The Color Morale	Metalcore; post-hardcore
2	Somewhere Under Wonderland	Counting Crows	Alternative rock; roots rock
2	V	Maroon 5	Pop rock; pop; Electro
5	Goddess	Banks	Electronica; alternative R&B
8	El Pintor	Interpol	Alternative rock; indie rock
9	Blood & Lemonade	American Hi-Fi	Pop punk; pop rock
9	All Together Now	Better Than Ezra	Alternative rock
9	I Don't Dance	Lee Brice	Country
9	Souled Out	Jhené Aiko	PBR&B
9	Kids These Days	Judah & the Lion	Alternative rock; folk rock
9	Where It's At	Dustin Lynch	Country
9	Title	Meghan Trainor	Pop; R&B
9	Journey To Freedom	Michelle Williams	Contemporary gospel; R&B
16	Just Enough Hip to Be Woman	Broncho	Indie rock
16	X	Chris Brown	Contemporary R&B; hip hop
16	Between the Stars	Flyleaf	Post-grunge; hard rock; pop rock; emo-metal; alternative metal
16	Run Wild. Live Free. Love Strong.	For King & Country	CCM; alternative rock; indie rock; pop rock
16	Hope	Manchester Orchestra	Acoustic; indie rock
16	Sundown Heaven Town	Tim McGraw	Country
16	You Haunt Me	Sir Sly	Indie pop; indie rock
16	Broken Compass	Sleepwave	Industrial metal; alternative rock; post-hardcore
16	Bulletproof Picasso	Train	Rock; pop rock
23	Cheek to Cheek	Tony Bennett and Lady Gaga	Jazz
23	The Big Revival	Kenny Chesney	Country
23	Encyclopedia	The Drums	Indie pop; indie rock
23	Awakening	Jackie Evancho	Classical crossover
23	JHUD	Jennifer Hudson	R&B
23	Luke James	Luke James	R&B
23	Strut	Lenny Kravitz	Rock
23	Plain Spoken	John Mellencamp	Americana; folk rock; roots; heartland rock
23	PTX	Pentatonix	A cappella; pop
23	Sukierae	Tweedy	Rock
29	Hesitant Alien	Gerard Way	Alternative rock; Britpop
30	Collide	Boyz II Men	R&B
30	Gypsy Heart	Colbie Caillat	Pop; folk; R&B
30	Back to Oblivion	Finch	Alternative rock; post-hardcore
30	747	Lady Antebellum	Country; country rock
30	Holiday for Swing	Seth MacFarlane	Christmas; traditional pop; swing; big band
30	Art Official Age	Prince	R&B and soul; electro-funk
30	Bringing Back the Sunshine	Blake Shelton	Country

=== October ===
Day	Title	Artist	Genre(s)
1	Recklessly (EP)	Hot Chelle Rae	Pop rock
7	Old Boots, New Dirt	Jason Aldean	Country
7	You're Dead!	Flying Lotus	Electronic; trip hop
7	It's About Us	Alex & Sierra	Pop; indie pop
7	Point of No Return	Keyshia Cole	R&B; hip hop; soul
7	The Way	Macy Gray	R&B; soul
7	Resurrection	New Found Glory	Pop punk
7	Taiga	Zola Jesus	Synth-pop
7	Aquarius	Tinashe	R&B
7	Everything Will Be Alright in the End	Weezer	Alternative rock; power pop
7	Phantom Pop	Wild Party	Pop-rock
7	Lift a Sail	Yellowcard	Alternative rock; pop rock
14	Anything Goes	Florida Georgia Line	Country
14	Heart on My Sleeve	Mary Lambert	R&B; pop
14	Andrew McMahon in the Wilderness	Andrew McMahon in the Wilderness	Pop rock; soft rock
14	Holiday Wishes	Idina Menzel	Christmas
14	Hungry Ghosts	OK Go	Alternative rock
14	Ride Out	Bob Seger	Rock; heartland rock
14	Duality	Set It Off	Pop punk; pop rock; alternative rock
14	Rose. Ave.	You+Me	Folk; pop
21	Under Pressure	Logic	Hip hop
21	Finest Hour: The Best of Gavin DeGraw	Gavin DeGraw	Blue-eyed soul; rock; pop rock
21	Jukebox the Ghost	Jukebox the Ghost	Power pop; indie pop
21	Pain Killer	Little Big Town	Country
21	That's Christmas to Me	Pentatonix	Christmas; A cappella
21	Primus & the Chocolate Factory with the Fungi Ensemble	Primus	Experimental rock
21	.5: The Gray Chapter	Slipknot	Metal
21	Paperwork: The Motion Picture	T.I.	Hip hop
27	...And We Explode	Black Map	Alternative metal
27	Undefeated	Secondhand Serenade	Alternative rock; pop rock
27	1989	Taylor Swift	Pop
27	Love Ran Red	Chris Tomlin	CCM; worship
28	The Turn	Live	Alternative rock
28	Classics	She & Him	Indie pop
28	Feels So Good	Dionne Warwick	R&B

=== November ===
Day	Title	Artist	Genre(s)
6	Broke with Expensive Taste	Azealia Banks	Hip hop; dance-pop
10	Antemasque	Antemasque	Alternative rock; punk rock
10	Sonic Highways	Foo Fighters	Post-grunge; hard rock; alternative rock
10	Nick Jonas	Nick Jonas	Pop
10	Non Fiction	Ne-Yo	R&B
11	Knives to the Future	Project 86	Christian rock; post-hardcore
12	Weathered	Angie Miller	Pop
14	Milking the Stars: A Re-Imagining Of Last Patrol	Monster Magnet	Stoner rock; psychedelic rock
17	Coming Home	Kristin Chenoweth	Country; pop; vocal pop; disco
17	Jersey	Bella Thorne	Pop
17	Black Widow	In This Moment	Gothic metal; alternative metal; electronic rock; industrial metal
18	Seeds	TV on the Radio	Indie rock; alternative rock
18	The Gold Album: 18th Dynasty	Tyga	Hip hop
24	Man Against Machine	Garth Brooks	Country
24	Descensus	Circa Survive	Progressive rock; post-hardcore
24	Shady XV	Various Shady Records artists	Hip hop
24	For You	Selena Gomez	Pop; dance; electropop
24	Globalization	Pitbull	Hip hop
24	Hood Billionaire	Rick Ross	Hip hop
28	Songs for Dads (EP)	The Walters	Indie pop

=== December ===
Day	Title	Artist	Genre(s)
2	Sex Playlist	Omarion	R&B
2	Talking Is Hard	Walk the Moon	Pop rock; alternative rock; indie pop
4	Shadows to Light (EP)	Shoshana Bean	Pop-soul
8	2014 Forest Hills Drive	J. Cole	Hip hop
9	The Dream Walker	Angels & Airwaves	Alternative rock
9	Anybody Wanna Buy a Heart	K. Michelle	R&B
9	Monuments to an Elegy	The Smashing Pumpkins	Alternative rock
9	Greatest Hits: Decade Number 1	Carrie Underwood	Country
15	Black Messiah	D'Angelo	Neo soul
15	The Pinkprint	Nicki Minaj	Hip hop
16	Player Select	Starbomb	Comedy hip hop; synthpop; nerdcore
23	Redefine	Inspection 12	Pop punk; punk rock

== Top songs on record ==
=== Billboard Hot 100 No. 1 Songs ===
- "All About That Bass" – Meghan Trainor (8 weeks)
- "All of Me" – John Legend (3 weeks)
- "Blank Space" – Taylor Swift (5 weeks)
- "Dark Horse" – Katy Perry feat. Juicy J (4 weeks)
- "Fancy" – Iggy Azalea feat. Charli XCX (7 weeks)
- "Happy" – Pharrell Williams (10 weeks)
- "Rude" – MAGIC! (6 weeks)
- "Shake It Off" – Taylor Swift (4 weeks)
- "The Monster" – Eminem feat. Rihanna (2 weeks in 2014, 2 weeks in 2013)
- "Timber" – Pitbull feat. Kesha (3 weeks)

=== Billboard Hot 100 Top 20 Hits ===
All songs that reached the Top 20 on the Billboard Hot 100 chart during the year, complete with peak chart placement.

- "23" – Mike Will Made It feat. Miley Cyrus, Wiz Khalifa and Juicy J (#14 in 2014, #11 in 2013)
- "7/11" – Beyoncé (#13)
- "A Sky Full of Stars" – Coldplay (#10)
- "Ain't It Fun" – Paramore (#10)
- "All About That Bass" – Meghan Trainor (#1)
- "All of Me" – John Legend (#1)
- "Am I Wrong" – Nico & Vinz (#4)
- "Amnesia" – 5 Seconds of Summer (#16)
- "Anaconda" – Nicki Minaj (#2)
- "Animals" – Maroon 5 (#3)
- "Bailando" – Enrique Iglesias feat. Sean Paul, Gente de Zona and Descemer Bueno (#12)
- "Bang Bang" – Jessie J, Ariana Grande and Nicki Minaj (#3)
- "Best Day of My Life" – American Authors (#11)
- "Billie Jean" – Michael Jackson (#14 in 2014, #1 in 1983)
- "Birthday" – Katy Perry (#17)
- "Black Widow" – Iggy Azalea feat. Rita Ora (#3)
- "Blame" – Calvin Harris feat. John Newman (#19)
- "Blank Space" – Taylor Swift (#1)
- "Blurred Lines" – Robin Thicke feat. T.I. and Pharrell (#19 in 2014, #1 in 2013)
- "Boom Clap" – Charli XCX (#8)
- "Booty" – Jennifer Lopez feat. Iggy Azalea or Pitbull (#18)
- "Bottoms Up" – Brantley Gilbert (#20)
- "Break Free" – Ariana Grande feat. Zedd (#4)
- "Burn" – Ellie Goulding (#13)
- "Burnin' It Down" – Jason Aldean (#12)
- "Can't Remember to Forget You" – Shakira feat. Rihanna (#15)
- "Chandelier" – Sia (#8)
- "Classic" – MKTO (#14)
- "Cool Kids" – Echosmith (#13)
- "Counting Stars" – OneRepublic (#2)
- "Dark Horse" – Katy Perry feat. Juicy J (#1)
- "Demons" – Imagine Dragons (#6)
- "Dirt" – Florida Georgia Line (#11)
- "Do What U Want" – Lady Gaga feat. R. Kelly (#16 in 2014, #13 in 2013)
- "Don't" – Ed Sheeran (#9)
- "Don't Tell 'Em" – Jeremih feat. YG (#6)
- "Drunk in Love" – Beyoncé feat. Jay-Z (#2)
- "Fancy" – Iggy Azalea feat. Charli XCX (#1)
- "Habits (Stay High)" – Tove Lo (#3)
- "Happy" – Pharrell Williams (#1)
- "Hey Brother" – Avicii (#16)
- "Hold On, We're Going Home" – Drake feat. Majid Jordan (#13 in 2014, #4 in 2013)
- "Hot Nigga" – Bobby Shmurda (#6)
- "I Don't Fuck with You" – Big Sean feat. E-40 (#11)
- "I'm Not the Only One" – Sam Smith (#5)
- "Jealous" – Nick Jonas (#8)
- "La La La" – Naughty Boy feat. Sam Smith (#19)
- "Latch" – Disclosure feat. Sam Smith (#7)
- "Let Her Go" – Passenger (#5)
- "Let It Go" – Idina Menzel (#5)
- "Lifestyle" – Rich Gang feat. Young Thug and Rich Homie Quan (#16)
- "Lips Are Movin" – Meghan Trainor (#4)
- "Love Me Harder" – Ariana Grande and The Weeknd (#7)
- "Love Never Felt So Good" – Michael Jackson and Justin Timberlake (#9)
- "Love Runs Out" – OneRepublic (#15)
- "Loyal" – Chris Brown feat. Lil Wayne and French Montana, Too Short or Tyga (#9)
- "Magic" – Coldplay (#14)
- "Maps" – Maroon 5 (#6)
- "Me and My Broken Heart" – Rixton (#14)
- "My Nigga" – YG feat. Jeezy and Rich Homie Quan (#19)
- "No Type" – Rae Sremmurd (#16)
- "Not a Bad Thing" – Justin Timberlake (#8)
- "Only" – Nicki Minaj feat. Drake, Lil Wayne and Chris Brown (#12)
- "Out of the Woods" – Taylor Swift (#18)
- "Play It Again" – Luke Bryan (#14)
- "Pompeii" – Bastille (#5)
- "Problem" – Ariana Grande feat. Iggy Azalea (#2)
- "Radioactive" – Imagine Dragons (#13 in 2014, #3 in 2013)
- "Rather Be" – Clean Bandit feat. Jess Glynne (#10)
- "Roar" – Katy Perry (#8 in 2014, #1 in 2013)
- "Royals" – Lorde (#4 in 2014, #1 in 2013)
- "Rude" – MAGIC! (#1)
- "Say Something" – A Great Big World and Christina Aguilera (#4)
- "#SELFIE" – The Chainsmokers (#16)
- "Shake It Off" – Taylor Swift (#1)
- "Show Me" – Kid Ink feat. Chris Brown (#13)
- "Shower" – Becky G (#16)
- "Sing" – Ed Sheeran (#13)
- "Somethin' Bad" – Miranda Lambert feat. Carrie Underwood (#19)
- "Stay the Night" – Zedd feat. Hayley Williams (#18)
- "Stay with Me" – Sam Smith (#2)
- "Steal My Girl" – One Direction (#13)
- "Story of My Life" – One Direction (#9 in 2014, #6 in 2013)
- "Summer" – Calvin Harris (#7)
- "Sweater Weather" – The Neighbourhood (#16 in 2014, #14 in 2013)
- "Take Me to Church" – Hozier (#2)
- "Talk Dirty" – Jason Derulo feat. 2 Chainz (#3)
- "Team" – Lorde (#6)
- "The Hanging Tree" – James Newton Howard feat. Jennifer Lawrence (#12)
- "The Heart Wants What It Wants" – Selena Gomez (#6)
- "The Man" – Aloe Blacc (#8)
- "The Monster" – Eminem feat. Rihanna (#1)
- "Thinking Out Loud" – Ed Sheeran (#6)
- "This Is How We Roll" – Florida Georgia Line feat. Luke Bryan (#15)
- "Timber" – Pitbull feat. Kesha (#1)
- "Trumpets" – Jason Derulo (#14)
- "Tuesday" – ILoveMakonnen feat. Drake (#12)
- "Turn Down for What" – DJ Snake and Lil Jon (#4)
- "Unconditionally" – Katy Perry (#20 in 2014, #14 in 2013)
- "Uptown Funk" – Mark Ronson feat. Bruno Mars (#3)
- "Wake Me Up!" – Avicii (#8 in 2014, #4 in 2013)
- "Wasted Love" – Matt McAndrew (#14)
- "Waves" – Mr Probz (#14)
- "We Might Be Dead By Tomorrow" – Soko (#9)
- "West Coast" – Lana Del Rey (#17)
- "White Walls" – Macklemore & Ryan Lewis feat. ScHoolboy Q and Hollis (#18 in 2014, #15 in 2013)
- "Wiggle" – Jason Derulo feat. Snoop Dogg (#5)
- "Wrecking Ball" – Miley Cyrus (#9 in 2014, #1 in 2013)

== Deaths ==
- January 2 – Jay Traynor, 70, singer (Jay and the Americans)
- January 3 – Phil Everly, 74, rock singer (The Everly Brothers)
- January 7 – Maureen Gray, 65, songwriter and doo-wop singer
- January 9 – Roy Campbell, Jr., 61, trumpet player
- January 18 – Dennis Frederiksen, 62, rock singer (Toto, LeRoux, Angel)
- January 25 – Arthur Doyle, 69, singer-songwriter, saxophonist, and flute player
- January 26 – Rusty York, 78, singer-songwriter and guitarist
- January 27 – Pete Seeger, 94, folk singer
- January 28
  - John Cacavas, 83, composer and conductor
  - Dwight Gustafson, 83, composer and conductor
  - Stevie Woods, 62, R&B singer and musician
- January 29 – Johnny Allen, 96, pianist and arranger
- January 30 – The Mighty Hannibal, 74, singer-songwriter and producer
- February 5 – Richard Hayman, 93, harmonica player, composer, and conductor
- February 8 – Dick Berk, 74, drummer and bandleader
- February 12 – Maggie Estep, 50, spoken word artist, poet and writer
- February 16 – Raymond Louis Kennedy, 67, singer-songwriter, saxophonist, and producer
- February 17 – Bob Casale, 61, new wave guitarist (Devo)
- February 22 – Trebor Jay Tichenor, 74, pianist and composer
- February 23
  - Chip Damiani, 68, drummer (The Remains)
  - Penny DeHaven, 65, country music and gospel singer
- February 24
  - Franny Beecher, 92, rock guitarist (Bill Haley & His Comets)
  - Kelly Holland, 52, singer (Cry of Love)
- February 26
  - Frank Reed, 59, singer (The Chi-Lites)
  - Frankie Sardo, 77, rock and roll singer, actor and film producer
  - Tim Wilson, 52, country music artist and stand-up comedian
- March 6
  - Charles Love, 68, singer and guitarist (Bloodstone)
  - Speaker Knockerz, 19, rapper and record producer
- March 8
  - Jerry Corbitt, 71, guitarist (The Youngbloods)
  - Buren Fowler, 54, guitarist (Drivin' n' Cryin')
- March 14 – Gary Burger, 72, garage rock singer and guitarist (The Monks)
- March 15 – Scott Asheton, 64, rock drummer (The Stooges)
- March 18 – Joe Lala, 66, percussionist and musician (Blues Image)
- March 23 – Dave Brockie, 50, metal vocalist (Gwar)
- March 25 – Eddie Lawrence, 95, monologist, actor, singer, lyricist
- March 28 – Joe Frazier, 77, singer (Chad Mitchell Trio)
- March 31 – Frankie Knuckles, 59, house disk jockey and producer
- April 1 – Joe "Speedo" Frazier, 70, singer (The Impalas)
- April 3
  - Paul Salamunovich, 86, conductor and educator
  - Arthur "Guitar Boogie" Smith, 93, musician and songwriter
- April 5
  - Wayne Henderson,74, trombonist and record producer (The Jazz Crusaders)
  - Jason McCash, 38, metal bassist (The Gates of Slumber)
- April 6 – David Lamb, folk singer and guitarist (Brown Bird)
- April 11 – Jesse Winchester, 69, musician and songwriter
- April 15 – Little Joe Cook, 91, singer and songwriter (Little Joe & The Thrillers)
- April 18 – Deon Jackson, 68, soul singer and songwriter
- April 19 – Kevin Sharp, 43, country music singer
- April 21 – Mundo Earwood, 61, country singer-songwriter
- April 26 – DJ Rashad, 34, electronic and hip hop disk jockey
- April 27 – DJ EZ Rock, 46, hip-hop DJ (Rob Base and DJ E-Z Rock)
- April 29 – Paul Goddard, 68, bassist (Atlanta Rhythm Section)
- April 30 – Larry Ramos, 72, singer and musician (The Association)
- May 2 – Jessica Cleaves, 65, singer and songwriter (The Friends of Distinction)
- May 3 – Bobby Gregg, 78, musician, drummer, and record producer
- May 9 – Joe Wilder, 92, trumpet player, composer, and bandleader
- May 11 – Ed Gagliardi, 62, bass player (Foreigner)
- May 18 – Jerry Vale, 83, singer and actor
- May 25 – Herb Jeffries, 100, popular music and jazz singer
- June 2
  - Ramona Brooks, 63, singer
  - Weldon Myrick, 76, steel guitar player (The Nashville A-Team, Area Code 615)
- June 15 – Casey Kasem, 82, co-creator and original host of American Top 40, DJ, music historian
- June 18 – Johnny Mann, 85, arranger, composer and recording artist
- June 19 – Gerry Goffin, 75, lyricist
- June 22 – Teenie Hodges, 68, guitarist and songwriter (Hi Rhythm Section)
- June 24 – Lee McBee, 63, singer and harmonica player
- June 27 – Bobby Womack, 70, R&B singer, songwriter
- July 1 – Betty Cody, 92, country singer
- July 3 – Jesse Anderson, 73, blues singer-songwriter and musician
- July 7 – Lois Johnson, 72, country singer
- July 11
  - Charlie Haden, 76, bassist and composer (Old and New Dreams)
  - Tommy Ramone, 65, producer and founding Ramones drummer
- July 16 – Johnny Winter, 70, singer, songwriter, multi-instrumentalist
- July 18 – James Govan, 64, singer-songwriter
- July 19 – Lionel Ferbos, trumpet player
- July 23 – Norman Leyden, composer and conductor, 96
- July 26 – Johnny Winter, 70, blues guitarist, singer, songwriter
- July 29 – Idris Muhammad, 74, jazz drummer
- July 30 – Dick Wagner, 71, guitarist and songwriter (The Frost, Alice Cooper)
- August 1 – Michael Johns, 35, singer and American Idol season 7 finalist
- August 2 – Rosetta Hightower, 70, singer (The Orlons)
- August 24 – Talmadge "Tommy" Gough, 74, singer (The Crests)
- August 31 – Jimi Jamison, 63, vocalist (Survivor)
- September 5 – Simone Battle, 25, pop singer (G.R.L.)
- September 11 – Bob Crewe, 83, songwriter and record producer
- September 12 – Joe Sample, 75, pianist, keyboard player, and composer (The Jazz Crusaders)
- September 17 – George Hamilton IV, 77, country singer
- September 20 – Polly Bergen, 84, actress and singer
- September 24 – Priscilla Mitchell, 73, country music singer
- October 4 – Paul Revere, 76, keyboardist and musician (Paul Revere & the Raiders)
- October 7 – Iva Withers, 97, Canadian-American actress and singer
- October 14 – Isaiah "Ikey" Owens, 38, keyboardist (The Mars Volta, Jack White)
- October 16 – Tim Hauser, 72, singer (The Manhattan Transfer)
- October 18 – Paul Craft, 76, singer-songwriter
- October 23 – Jeanne Black, 76, country music singer
- October 24 – Marcia Strassman, 66, actress and singer
- November 1 – Wayne Static, 48, metal vocalist (Static-X)
- November 9 – Jonathan Athon, 32, metal bassist (Black Tusk)
- November 17 – Jimmy Ruffin, 78, soul singer
- November 18 – Dave Appell, 92, musician, arranger and record producer (The Applejacks)
- December 3 – Edward "Sonny" Bivins, 78, R&B singer (The Manhattans)
- December 9 – Winfred "Blue" Lovett, 78, R&B singer (The Manhattans)
- December 11 – Dawn Sears, 53, singer-songwriter
- December 16 – Wendy Rene, 67, soul singer and songwriter
- December 18 – Larry Henley, 77, singer and songwriter (The Newbeats)
- December 22 – Joe Cocker, 70, singer
- December 23 – Jo Jo Benson, 76, R&B and soul singer

== See also ==
- 2010s in music
- 2014 in music
