= The Dollyrots vs. Bowling for Soup =

EP by The Dollyrots / Bowling for Soup
- Released: August 5, 2011
- Genre: Pop-punk
- Length: 6:51 (Vinyl); 13:23 (Digital download)
- Label: Que-so/Brando
- Producer: Linus of Hollywood

Bowling for Soup chronology
Fishin' for Woos (2011)	The Dollyrots vs. Bowling for Soup (2011)	Bowling for Soup Presents: One Big Happy! (2012)

The Dollyrots chronology
A Little Messed Up (2010)	The Dollyrots vs. Bowling for Soup (2011)	The Dollyrots (2012)

The Dollyrots vs. Bowling for Soup is a 7" split EP released by pop punk bands The Dollyrots and Bowling for Soup, in which the bands cover each other's songs, with The Dollyrots covering Bowling for Soup's "High School Never Ends" and Bowling for Soup covering The Dollyrots' "Because I'm Awesome." It was limited to 1,000 copies that were signed by both bands and sold through Bowling for Soup's online store as well as during Bowling for Soup and The Dollyrots West Coast U.S. tour in August 2011. A digital version was released at a later date with two additional bonus tracks. The digital version was released in November 2011 and included a Bowling for Soup cover of The Dollyrots' "Rollercoaster" and a Dollyrots cover of Bowling for Soup's "Almost."

== Track listing ==
=== 7" Vinyl Edition ===
Side A (The Dollyrots)
No.	Title	Writer(s)	Length
1.	"High School Never Ends" (Bowling for Soup cover)	Jaret Reddick, Adam Schlesinger	3:28

Side B (Bowling for Soup)
No.	Title	Writer(s)	Length
1.	"Because I'm Awesome" (The Dollyrots cover)	Kelly Ogden, Luis Cabezas, Amy Wood	3:23

Digital Download Edition
No.	Title	Writer(s)	Performer	Length
1.	"High School Never Ends" (Bowling for Soup cover)	Reddick, Schlesinger	The Dollyrots	3:28
2.	"Because I'm Awesome" (The Dollyrots cover)	Ogden, Cabezas, Wood	Bowling for Soup	3:23
3.	"Rollercoaster" (The Dollyrots cover)	Cabezas, Ogden, Fred Archambault	Bowling for Soup	3:19
4.	"Almost" (Bowling for Soup cover)	Reddick, Butch Walker	The Dollyrots	3:13

== Personnel ==
The Dollyrots

- Kelly Ogden – bass, vocals
- Luis Cabezas – guitar
- Chris Black – drums

Bowling for Soup

- Jaret Reddick – lead vocals, guitar
- Erik Chandler – bass, vocals
- Chris Burney – guitar, vocals
- Gary Wiseman – drums
- Linus of Hollywood – producer
- Dave Pearson – artwork and illustration

== Release history ==
Format	Date
7" vinyl	August 5, 2011
Digital download	November 27, 2011 (United Kingdom); November 29, 2011 (Worldwide)
