= Christopher Mario Testa =

American musician

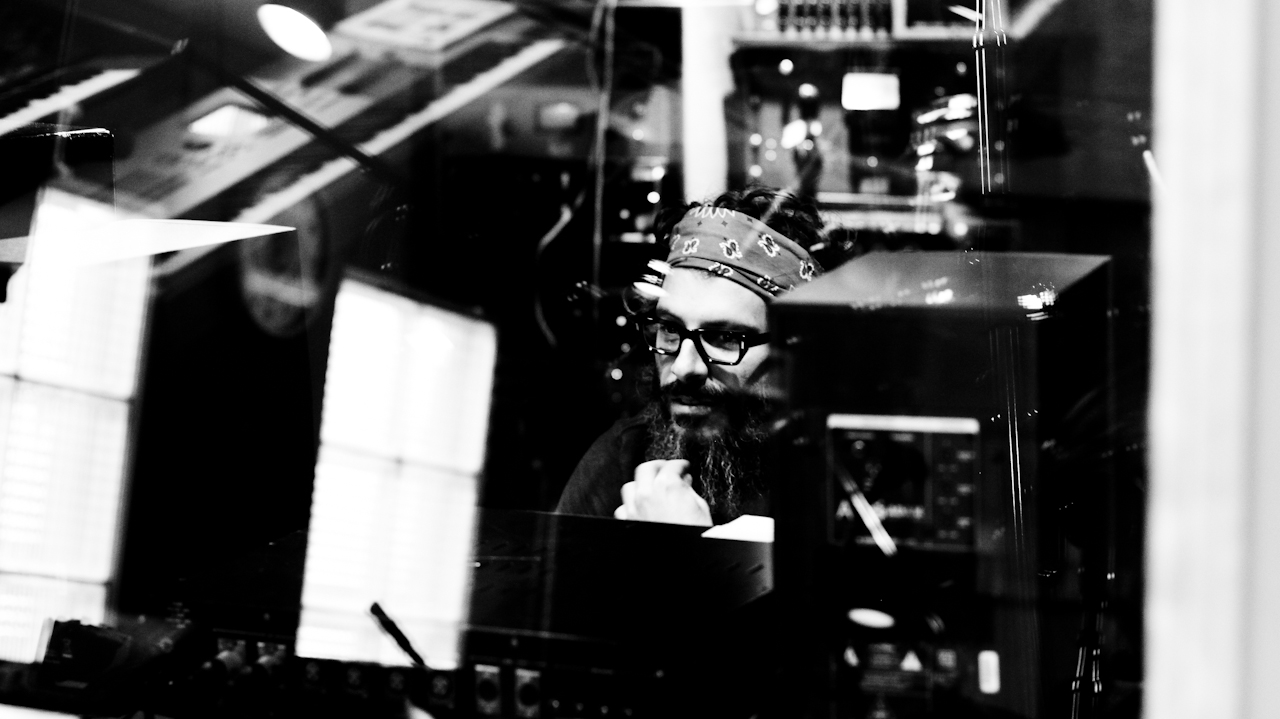
Christopher Mario Testa.

Christopher Mario Testa (born March 8, 1973) is an American producer, mixer, engineer, re-recording mixer, sound designer and musician. He was born in Florham Park, NJ. He now resides in Los Angeles, California.

== Biography ==
In the late 1990s Chris started his career as a drummer playing live gigs and doing sessions in and around the New York City area. In 2002 he got his first gig as an assistant engineer at the legendary, now defunct, Hit Factory Studios. He was the only person working there who didn't have any formal recording training. Even though he only worked there for a year it was enough time to work with many of rock, pop and hip hop's biggest stars such as Bruce Springsteen, Paul Simon, Billy Joel, Kanye West, J Lo, Beyoncé, and Justin Timberlake to name a few. After developing a relationship with Los Angeles producer's Jim Scott and John Fields he was convinced to make the move to Los Angeles to further his music career. He worked on many pop records working as engineer to producer John Fields with such pop artists as Pink, the Backstreet Boys, Mandy Moore and Switchfoot. Following that was a year stint at the legendary Cello Studios (the old United Western Recorders, the studio where the Beach Boys recorded Pet Sounds) working with fellow engineer and producer Jim Scott with such artists as Wilco, Tift Merritt, Kathleen Edwards, and Nikka Costa.

== The Dixie Chicks' "Taking the Long Way" ==
In mid-2005 Chris, along with Jim Scott, started work recording the Dixie Chicks Grammy Award winning album "Taking the Long Way" with Rick Rubin producing. Recording for the record went well into the following year. He did the bulk of the record with Jim Scott then continued on his own with the three girls, Natalie Maines, Martie Maguire, and Emily Robison. The record was recorded in legendary Los Angeles studios Sunset Sound and The Village. He is credited with engineering and playing additional percussion on the record. As the record finished up the girls put him to work on preparing material for the live show, working on their back catalog of ringtones and helping organize the studio audio for the movie "Shut Up and Sing" directed by Academy Award- winning director Barbara Kopple and Cecilia Peck.

== 2007 Grammy Awards Ceremony ==
In 2007 the Dixie Chicks won 5 Grammy's at the 49th Grammy Awards. The record won every coveted award including Album of the Year, Record of the Year, Song of the Year, Country Album of the Year, and Best Country Performance by a Duo or Group with Vocal. This marked the first time any band has won that many Grammy awards in the same year. Chris won Grammy's for 3 of the 5 including Album of the Year and Record of the Year. The record went on to sell almost 4 million copies worldwide and was #1 on Billboards Top 200 albums for 2 weeks in a row reaching gold status in the first week.

== Jimmy Eat World "Chase This Light" ==
Immediately following the Dixie Chicks record, Chris went to Tempe, AZ to record with emo rock pioneers Jimmy Eat World on what would become "Chase This Light". He was signed on first to engineer the record with the band producing and the legendary Butch Vig acting as Executive Producer. He wound up participating in more ways than the band had originally envisioned and was granted a producer credit on the record by the band. The record went on to be Jimmy Eat World's highest debut ever, debuting on the Billboard Top 200 at number 5.

== Current Work ==
He spent most of time producing and mixing bands moving back and forth between well known acts and more independent bands such as Rickie Lee Jones, Switchfoot, Sherree Chamberlain, The Dollyrots, Liquid Love Letter, Mat Kearney, the Goo Goo Dolls, the Subways and producing and mixing Phoenix indie rockers Source Victoria, Reubens Accomplice, Kinch and Courtney Marie Andrews. He continues to move between smaller bands and more well known artists producing and mixing from his adopted hometowns of Burbank and Silverlake, CA. Currently he is moving between mixing television shows, films and records. He spent most of 2013 working for TheCo as their in house re-recording mixer and sound designer. In 2014 he started working for Lighthearted Entertainment as their in house re-recording mixer. In 2015 he mixed over 70 episodes for the Company, Lighthearted Entertainment and Intuitive Entertainment for such networks as CNBC, MTV, VH1, TLC and the Food Channel.

== Selected discography ==
Recording artists / albums

- Dixie Chicks "Taking the Long Way"
- Jimmy Eat World "Chase This Light"
- Paul Simon "Surprise"
- Pink "Try This"
- Rickie Lee Jones "Balm in Gilead"
- Goo Goo Dolls "Something for the Rest of Us"
- Switchfoot "Nothing Is Sound" "Oh! Gravity."
- Backstreet Boys "Never Gone"
- Elvis Presley "ELV1S"
- Cheap Trick "Special One"
- Justin Timberlake
- Matchbox Twenty "More Than You Think You Are"
- The Black Crowes
- Tony Bennett
- MatKearney "City of Black & White"
- Edie Brickell "Volcano"
- "Never Let Me Go (2010 film)"
- The Dollyrots "Because I'm Awesome" "A Little Messed Up"
- Nikka Costa "can'tneverdidnothin'"
- Willie Nelson "Countryman"
- Mandy Moore "Coverage"
- RZA
- Harry Connick Jr.
- Glen Phillips "Winter Pays For Summer" "Unlucky 7"
- Miley Cyrus
- Sherree Chamberlain "A Wasp In the Room"
- Reuben's Accomplice "Son's of Men" (TBA)
- Source Victoria "The Fast Escape" "Slow Luck"
- Kinch "The Incandenza"
- Domo "With Friends Like These"
- Sacha Sacket
- Low Millions
- Courtney Marie Andrews "No One's Slate Is Clean"
- Reto Burrell "Go"
- Audioslave
- Kathleen Edwards "Back to Me"
- Tift Merritt "Tambourine
- Neko Case "The Worse Things Get The Harder I Fight. The Harder I Fight, the More I Love You."
- Victory
- Marc Carroll "Stone Beads and Silver"
- Crystal Fighters "Cave Rave"

Television

- Are You The One
- Dating Naked
- West Texas Investors Club
- Twinning
- They Took Our Child
- Labor Games
- Bye Felicia
- King of Cones
- Heartbreakers
- The Moment, USA Network
- Race To The Scene, Reelz
- The Profit, CNBC
- The Hiring Squad, Spike

Films

- The Dictator, Paramount Pictures
- Never Let Me Go, Fox Searchlight
- Shut Up and Sing, The Weinstein Company
- Something's Gotta Give, Columbia Pictures
