= One Big Happy =

One Big Happy may refer to:

- One Big Happy (comic strip)
- One Big Happy (TV series)
- Bowling for Soup Presents: One Big Happy!, a split album by Bowling for Soup, The Dollyrots, and Patent Pending
