= Hark! (The Doppelgangaz album) =

Hark

Studio album by The Doppelgangaz
- Released: March 12, 2013
- Recorded: 2012
- Genre: Hip hop
- Label: Groggy Pack Entertainment, LLC
- Producer: The Doppelgangaz

The Doppelgangaz chronology
Beats For Brothels, Vol. 2 (2012)	Hark (2013)	Peace Kehd (2014)

Hark, is the third studio album by The Doppelgangaz. It was released on March 12, 2013, by their label Groggy Pack Entertainment, LLC. The album was entirely produced by The Doppelgangaz. They've released music videos on YouTube for the songs "Hark Back", "Oh Well", "Skin Yarmulke", "Barbiturates" and "Sun Shine".

== Track listing ==
1. Doppel Hobble - 1:30
2. Skin Yarmulke - 2:30
3. Hark Back - 4:26
4. Us 2 Da Man - 3:20
5. Taking Them Pills - 1:19
6. Oh Well - 3:25
7. Sugar Awn Eht - 3:16
8. Barbiturates - 3:23
9. Harken Forward - 1:21
10. On The Rag - 4:48
11. Smang Life - 4:42
12. Sun Shine - 3:46
