= Eat My Heart Out =

Studio album by The Dollyrots
- Released: 21 September 2004
- Recorded: Capitol Records Studio B (Hollywood, CA), Redstar (Silverlake, CA), Mansfield Lodge (Hollywood, CA)
- Genre: Punk rock, Pop punk
- Length: 36:37
- Label: Panic Button Records/Lookout Records
- Producer: John Fields

The Dollyrots chronology
Eat My Heart Out (2004)	Because I'm Awesome (2007)

Eat My Heart Out is the debut album by pop punk band The Dollyrots. It was released on 21 September 2004 on Lookout Records.

A song from the album, "Feed Me, Pet Me" was used in a 2002 Hewlett-Packard ad campaign in which the band also appeared.

== Release ==
On August 25, 2004, the Dollyrots signed to Panic Button and Lookout! Records; alongside this, it was announced that the band would release their debut the following month. The album was released on 21 September 2004. In March and April 2005, they toured across the US. In October and November 2005, they supported the Groovie Ghoulies on their headlining North American trek. In April 2010, Dionysus Records in conjunction with the band re-released the album on vinyl. 500 copies of the album were pressed on blue and white opaque vinyl with a download coupon which included the complete album plus three previously unreleased B sides from the album sessions.

== Reception ==
Rick Anderson on Allmusic gave the album a positive review, awarding it four out of five stars. Anderson stated: "The Dollyrots are certainly nothing new – no genre-transgressing experiments, no incongruous fusions, no mind-expanding instrumental solos or side-long suites. Just 13 tight, compact, sweet, and crunchy bursts of punky power pop". Anderson also praised singer Kelly Ogden, saying that "her voice is clear and sharp, and her delivery is by turns sweet and snotty." Hunter Felt on PopMatters wrote "What Eat My Heart Out does have are elements missing in most paint-by-numbers pop-punk: a sense of true fun, not the forced and contrived "fun" of the Blink-182 wannabes, and an infectious energy", adding that the band "actually seem to be able to translate their well-regarded live shows onto a disc without sacrificing the spontaneity their music requires".

== Track listing ==
All tracks are written by Kelly Ogden and Luis Cabezas except where noted.

No.	Title	Length
1.	"Kick Me to the Curb"	2:55
2.	"Love You Most"	3:28
3.	"Jackie Chan" (Cabezas, Josh Harrold, Ogden,)	1:49
4.	"Wreckage"	3:36
5.	"Feed Me, Pet Me"	1:58
6.	"Penny"	2:58
7.	"Goodnight Tonight"	3:20
8.	"Dance With Me"	3:08
9.	"New College"	3:05
10.	"Promised Call"	3:20
11.	"Skinny"	1:45
12.	"Nobody Else"	3:09
13.	"Be My Baby" (Jeff Barry, Ellie Greenwich, Phil Spector)	2:06

2010 re-release bonus tracks (digital only)
No.	Title	Length
14.	"Alpha Mansion"	2:54
15.	"Little Black Book"	2:41
16.	"This Crush"	2:41

== Personnel ==
The following people worked on the album:

The Dollyrots

- Kelly Ogden – bass, vocals
- Luis Cabezas – guitar, background vocals
- Josh Valenti – drums

Production

- John Fields – producer, recording, mixing
- Chris Testa – recording
- Steven Miller – recording, mixing
- Dave Collins – mastering

Cover

- Kathleen Lolley – artwork
- Michael Seman – logo
- Cooper Gilespie – layout & design
- Jeff O – additional construction
- Chris A – additional construction
- Lissa Hahn – inside cover photo
- James Berson – back tray photo
