= John Fields (music producer) =

American record producer

John Fields (born September 11, 1968) is an American music producer, recording engineer, mixer, and musician. Fields has produced for a number of musical artists, including the Jonas Brothers, Switchfoot, Pink, Har Mar Superstar, Miley Cyrus, Ben Rector, Andrew W.K., Busted and Demi Lovato. He also has played a number of musical instruments on various albums, and even occasionally performed live with bands such as Nick Jonas & the Administration, Soul Asylum, and The Rembrandts. He is a founding member of the Minneapolis Funk Collective, Greazy Meal.

== Selected production/mix discography ==
Albums

- 1992 – Leatherwoods -Topeka Oratorio
- 1993 – The Commodores – No Tricks
- 1993 – The Hang Ups - Coming Through
- 1994 – Delilahs – Delilahs
- 1994 – David Wolfenson - Abbott Ave
- 1994 – Mango Jam - Somewhere in the Middle
- 1994 – Bug! - Bug!
- 1995 – The Rembrandts – LP
- 1995 – The Honeydogs - The Honeydogs
- 1995 – Marlee MacLeod - Favorite Ball and Chain
- 1995 – Delilahs – Dying To Build A Bridge
- 1995 – Iya - Send the Love
- 1995 – The Suburbs - Viva! Suburbs! Live at First Avenue
- 1996 – Willie Wisely - She
- 1996 – Rex Daisy - Guys and Dolls
- 1996 – Mango Jam - Flux
- 1996 – Slim Dunlap - Times Like This
- 1996 – Minneapolis Does Denver: Tribute to John Denver
- 1996 – Greazy Meal - Visualize World Greaze
- 1996 – Jack Logan - Mood Elevator
- 1997 – Willie Wisely - Turbosherbet
- 1997 – Greazy Meal – Digitalize World Greaze
- 1997 – Marlee MacLeod - Vertigo
- 1998 – Dovetail Joint - Level EP
- 1998 – Tina & the B-Sides - It's All Just The Same
- 1998 – Dovetail Joint - 001
- 1998 – Greazy Meal – Gravy
- 1998 – Funkytown (Motion Picture Soundtrack)
- 2000 – Evan & Jaron – Evan & Jaron
- 2000 – The Januaries - The Januaries
- 2000 – Marlee MacLeod - There We Are
- 2000 – The Honeydogs - Here's Luck
- 2001 – Iffy - Biota Bondo
- 2001 – Andrew W.K. – I Get Wet
- 2001 – Semisonic – All About Chemistry
- 2002 – Marlee MacLeod - Like Hollywood
- 2002 – Bleu - Redhead
- 2003 – Wheat - Per Second, Per Second, Per Second... Every Second
- 2003 – Switchfoot – The Beautiful Letdown
- 2003 – Lillix – Falling Uphill
- 2003 – Delta Goodrem – Innocent Eyes
- 2003 – Mandy Moore – Coverage
- 2003 – Puffy AmiYumi - Nice
- 2003 – Pink – Try This
- 2003 – Andrew W.K. – - The Wolf
- 2004 – Har Mar Superstar - The Handler
- 2004 – Delta Goodrem – Mistaken Identity
- 2004 – Truman - Payne Avenue
- 2004 – Greazy Meal – Universe's Baby
- 2004 – The Dollyrots – Eat My Heart Out
- 2005 – Glen Phillips – Winter Pays for Summer
- 2005 – Wakefield - Which Side Are You On?
- 2005 – Brandi Carlile - Brandi Carlile
- 2005 – Dropping Daylight - Take A Photograph
- 2005 – Switchfoot – Nothing Is Sound
- 2005 – Backstreet Boys – Never Gone
- 2006 – Switchfoot – Oh! Gravity.
- 2006 – the Replacements – Don't You Know Who I Think I Was? - The Best Of - mixed Message To The Boys, Pool & Dive
- 2005 – Backstreet Boys – Never Gone
- 2006 – Clay Aiken - A Thousand Different Ways
- 2006 – Soul Asylum - The Silver Lining
- 2006 – Clay Aiken - All Is Well: Songs For Christmas
- 2007 – Jonas Brothers – Jonas Brothers
- 2007 – Lifehouse – Who We Are
- 2007 – The Dollyrots – Because I'm Awesome
- 2007 – Rooney – Calling the World
- 2007 – Jimmy Eat World – Chase This Light
- 2008 – Cut Copy – In Ghost Colours
- 2008 – The Presets - Apocalypso
- 2008 – Jonas Brothers – A Little Bit Longer
- 2008 – Miley Cyrus – Breakout
- 2008 – Demi Lovato – Don't Forget
- 2008 – Jon McLaughlin – OK Now
- 2008 – The Melismatics – The Acid Test
- 2009 – The Binges – S/T
- 2009 – Jonas Brothers – Lines, Vines and Trying Times
- 2009 – Selena Gomez & the Scene – Kiss & Tell
- 2009 – Miley Cyrus – The Time of Our Lives
- 2009 – Evan Taubenfeld – Welcome to the Blacklist Club
- 2009 – Bleu - A Watched Pot
- 2009 – Ballas Hough Band - BHB
- 2009 – Demi Lovato – Here We Go Again
- 2009 – Parachute – Losing Sleep
- 2009 – Honor Society - Fashionably Late
- 2010 – Jonas Brothers – Jonas L.A.
- 2010 – Nick Jonas & the Administration – Who I Am
- 2010 – Goo Goo Dolls – Something for the Rest of Us
- 2010 – Steven Page – Page One
- 2010 – Alex Max Band - We've All Been There
- 2011 – The Summer Set – Everything's Fine
- 2011 – Daryl Hall – Laughing Down Crying
- 2011 – Allstar Weekend – All the Way
- 2011 – Parachute – The Way It Was
- 2011 – All Time Low – Dirty Work
- 2011 – Drake Bell – A Reminder
- 2011 – Jon Stevens – Testify!
- 2012 – The Dollyrots – The Dollyrots
- 2012 – Sam Sparro – Return to Paradise
- 2012 – Dave Barnes – Stories To Tell
- 2012 – Peter Cincotti – Metropolis
- 2012 – Windsor Drive – Wanderlust
- 2013 – Sunderland – Closer Now
- 2013 – Lily Kershaw - Midnight In The Garden
- 2013 – Jon Stevens - Fly (from the movie "Planes")
- 2013 – The Dead Daisies - The Dead Daisies
- 2013 – Marc Martel – The Prelude EP
- 2013 – Tyler Ward - Honestly
- 2013 – Megan and Liz – In the Shadows Tonight
- 2014 – Tenth Avenue North - Cathedrals
- 2014 – The Dollyrots – Barefoot and Pregnant
- 2014 – American Hi-Fi – Blood and Lemonade
- 2014 – Hurrah A Bolt of Light – Hurrah A Bolt of Light
- 2014 – Anastacia – Resurrection
- 2014 – Martel – Impersonator
- 2015 – Lawson - Perspective
- 2016 – Soul Asylum - Change of Fortune
- 2016 – Switchfoot – Where the Light Shines Through
- 2016 - Tenth Avenue North - Followers
- 2016 – The Dollyrots - Mama's Gonna Knock You Out EP
- 2016 – Busted – Night Driver
- 2016 – The Honeydogs - Love & Cannibalism
- 2017 – Flor - Come Out. You're Hiding
- 2017 – Anastacia – Evolution
- 2017 – The Dollyrots - Whiplash Splash
- 2017 – Friday Pilots Club - End Of It
- 2018 – Ben Rector - Magic
- 2019 – Tiny Moving Parts - Breathe
- 2019 – Ben Rector - MPLS Magic EP
- 2019 – The Dollyrots - Daydream Explosion
- 2019 – Cory Wong - Motivational Music for the Syncopated Soul
- 2019 – Flor - ley lines
- 2020 – Soul Asylum - Hurry Up And Wait
- 2020 – Irontom - Cult Following
- 2020 – Matt Wilson & his Orchestra - When I Was a Writer
- 2020 – Scott Mulvahill - Creative Potential EP
- 2020 – Jonatha Brooke - The Sweetwater Sessions
- 2020 – Vanessa Amorosi - The Blacklisted Collection
- 2020 – Public – Honey In The Summer (single)
- 2020 – Katy for Kings - Novelty EP
- 2020 – Zach Heckendorf - Hawk Talk
- 2020 – James Bourne - Safe Journey Home
- 2020 – Soul Asylum - Born Free
- 2020 – Ben Rector - It Would Be You (single)
- 2020 – Curtiss A - Jerks of Fate
- 2021 – Cory Wong - Cory and The Wongnotes Variety Show - Season 1
- 2021 – Cody Fry - Pictures of Mountains
- 2021 – Jetty Bones - Push Back
- 2021 – The Shackletons - The Shackletons
- 2022 – Cory Wong - Cory and The Wongnotes Variety Show - Season 2
- 2022 – Flipp - Too Dumb To Quit
- 2022 – Katy For Kings - Kinda, Almost EP
- 2022 – Sons Of Silver - Ordinary Sex Appeal EP
- 2022 – Ben Rector - The Joy of Music
- 2022 – Ben Rector & Thomas Rhett - "What Makes a Man"
- 2023 – Meet Me @ The Altar - Past // Present // Future
- 2023 – The Dollyrots - Night Owls
- 2023 – Jonas Brothers - "The Beautiful Letdown"
- 2023 – Willie Wisely - Willie Wisely's Christmastide Dreams
- 2024 – The Strike - A Dream Through Open Eyes
- 2024 – The Shackletons - Formerly the Albatross
- 2024 – Quinn Sullivan - Salvation
- 2024 – Jeremy Messersmith - The New York Times Crossword Puzzle (single)
- 2024 – Katy For Kings - Stomping Ground
- 2025 – Callie Twisselman - I Pray
- 2025 – Ben Rector - The Richest Man In The World
- 2025 – Jeremy Messersmith - Billionaires (single)
- 2025 – The Band Light - All I Need, Dreamboat, Turning Red
- 2025 – Maygen & The Birdwatcher - Feel Good (single)
- 2025 – The Honeydogs - Irish Goodbye (single)
- 2025 – Nick Govrik - One More Time For The Man - mixed (album)
- 2025 – Ben Rector - Not Afraid to Try (single)
- 2025 – Jennifer Grimm - For The Record - mixed
- 2025 – The Honeydogs - Algebra for Broken Hearts
- 2025 – Maygen & The Birdwatcher - The Americana Dream
- 2026 – Quinn Sullivan - Dust to Dust (single)
- 2026 – Ben Rector - Live at The Delta Center - mixed
- 2026 – Curtiss A - Walk Away Renee (single)
- 2026 – The Coup de Grace - No Stone Unturned
- 2026 – BZ3 Organ Trio - Epsilon - mixed
- 2026 – BZ3 Organ Trio - Pickled Herring - mixed
- 2026 – UltraBomb - The Bridges That We Burn
- 2026 – Jeremy Messersmith - Fox/Coyote
- 2026 – lovergirlxo - need you (that way) (single)
- 2026 – The Calling - Before The World Turns To Dust
- 2026 – Jonas Brothers - Listen When Sad (single)
