= Barefoot and Pregnant (album) =

Studio album by The Dollyrots
- Released: February 18, 2014
- Recorded: 2013
- Genre: Pop punk
- Length: 33:40
- Label: Arrested Youth Records
- Producer: John Fields

The Dollyrots chronology
Bowling for Soup Presents: One Big Happy! (2012)	Barefoot and Pregnant (2014)	Love Songs, Werewolves, & Zombies (2014)

Alternative Cover
- "Family friendly" version of the album cover.

Barefoot and Pregnant is the fifth studio album by the Los Angeles-based pop-punk band The Dollyrots. It was released on Arrested Youth Records, February 18, 2014.

== Track listing ==
All tracks are written by The Dollyrots.

No.	Title	Length
1.	"Come and Get It"	2:24
2.	"Stupidly in Love"	2:50
3.	"First World Anarchist"	2:27
4.	"Get Weird"	3:14
5.	"Puppy Dog Eyes"	3:19
6.	"Barefoot and Pregnant"	1:34
7.	"Bury Me in Ireland"	2:49
8.	"Nightlight"	3:11
9.	"Under the Same Sky"	3:05
10.	"Worstie"	2:39
11.	"Angel in Snow"	3:01
12.	"Homecoming"	3:13

Pre-order Bonus Track
No.	Title	Length
13.	"Da Doo Ron Ron / I Wanna Be Sedated" (The Crystals / The Ramones Cover)	2:56

Pledge Bonus Tracks
No.	Title	Length
14.	"Just Like All the Rest"	2:43
15.	"Super Mega Ultraviolet"	3:18
16.	"Love Ya, Love Ya, Love Ya" (feat. Jaret Reddick)	4:03
17.	"Goodnight Tonight" (Barefoot and Pregnant Version)	3:23

== Personnel ==
- Kelly Ogden – bass, vocals
- Luis Cabezas – guitar, vocals, recording, production
- Stacy Jones – drums
- Amy Wood – drums
- Ruby Fields – Viola on "Nightlight"
- Phillip Calhoun – Glockenspiel on "Nightlight"
- River Ogden Cabezas – Fetal Heartbeat in "Under the Same Sky"
- John Fields – production, additional percussion, keys, and FX
- Stephen Marsh – mastering
- Jack Daniel Cozzi, Tish Ciravolo, Morgan McGinnis, Tom Calhoun, Phillip Calhoun, Risty Perez, Stacy Jones, and John FIelds – background vocals

== Reception ==
=== Critical reception ===
Professional ratings
Review scores
Source	Rating
PopMatters	7/10 stars

PopMatters gave the album seven out of ten stars, saying "there’s more variety and nuance here than ever before; jokey hardcore runs seamlessly into mid-tempo stomps and bad-girl anthems, all powered by Luis Cabezas’ satisfyingly fuzzy guitars and delivered with an economy (13 songs in 37 minutes) that would have made Dee Dee and the boys proud. Barefoot and Pregnant is deeply hooky, melodic, wacky and at least as delightfully bratty as 2007’s Because I’m Awesome."

At Alternative Press, Jason Schreurs rated the album two out of five stars, calling the vast majority of the album is "way too predictable, feeling overly long at 13 songs"

=== Charts ===
Chart (2014)	Peak position
USA Billboard Heatseekers Albums	7
