= Arrested Youth =

EP by The Dollyrots
- Released: August 9, 2011
- Genre: Punk rock
- Length: 9:12
- Label: Arrested Youth Records
- Producer: Neal Pogue

Arrested Youth is a digital EP by the American pop punk band The Dollyrots. It was released on August 9, 2011 on the band's own label, Arrested Youth Records. 30 physical CD copies were made, these were initially made available on their 2011 summer tour, with then the remaining copies were sold via their web site.

== Track listing ==
All tracks are written by The Dollyrots except where noted.

| No. | Title | Length |
|---|---|---|
| 1. | "Playing With Fire" | 3:22 |
| 2. | "Interaction" | 2:18 |
| 3. | "Free At Last" | 3:42 |
