= Because I'm Awesome (song) =

""Because I'm Awesome""

Single by The Dollyrots

from the album Because I'm Awesome
- A-side: "Because I'm Awesome"
- Released: April 24, 2007
- Genre: Pop punk
- Length: 3:20
- Label: Blackheart Records
- Songwriter: The Dollyrots

"Because I'm Awesome" is the title track from the album Because I'm Awesome by the Dollyrots. The song has been used in TV shows, movies and commercials.

== Popular culture ==
The song has been used in the following TV shows and movies:

- "Ugly Betty" ("In Or Out" episode) ABC TV show (Jan 18, 2007)
- "Bad Girls Road Trip" Oxygen TV show (date?)
- "Greek" ("Multiple Choice" episode) ABC Family TV show
- "Picture This" ABC Family movie
- "The Sisterhood of the Traveling Pants 2" movie
- "Bring It On: Fight to the Finish" movie trailer
- "Nimona" Netflix movie
- "Billions (TV series)" Season 7, Episode 1: "Tower Of London" Showtime (TV network) TV series (August 11, 2023)

The song was used in a commercial for Kohl's and an instrumental version of the song was used during promotions for the Style Network on the E Network (Feb 23/24, 2007)

== Track listing ==
1. "Because I'm Awesome"

== Reception ==
- "On the roaring title track, Ogden catalogs her awesomeness ("Cuz my brain is really super-sized") to an unworthy suitor, and it's hard to disagree with either her admittedly silly reasons or Cabeza's infectious riff." (Hartford Courant, Sarasota Herald-Tribune)
- "The band's "Because I'm Awesome" single was one of my favourites of 2007" (Lorne Thomson, the Music Fix, 2008)
- "A hit song is what separates one band from thousands of others. The Dollyrots gained acclaim with their song "Because I’m Awesome". It's an appropriate tune for the sardonic pop punk band from Los Angeles to gain entry onto music’s national stage." (Tim Parsons, Tahoe Daily Tribune, 2008)
- "'Because I’m Awesome' is the first single and is so catchy that you’ll find yourself tapping it out all day." (Bill James, Monsters and Critics, 2007)
