= Winter Pays for Summer =

Winter Pays For Summer

Studio album by Glen Phillips
- Released: March 29, 2005
- Recorded: Between 2003 and 2004
- Studios: Paramount Studios (Hollywood, California): Mansfield Lodge (Los Angeles, California); Mix This! (Pacific Palisades, California); Starstruck Studios (Nashville, Tennessee)
- Genres: Singer-songwriter, Alternative rock
- Length: 45:13
- Label: Lost Highway Records
- Producer: John Fields

Glen Phillips chronology
Live at Largo (2003)	Winter Pays For Summer (2005)	Unlucky 7 (2006)

Professional ratings
Review scores
Source	Rating
Allmusic	3.5/5 stars
Rolling Stone	3/5 stars

Winter Pays For Summer is an album released in 2005 by Glen Phillips. The album was Phillips' debut for Lost Highway/Universal Records. It was recorded during 2003 and 2004. It was produced by John Fields at Paramount Studios and Mansfield Lodge, and features guest appearances by Jon Brion, Sam Phillips, Ben Folds, Andy Sturmer, Kristin Mooney, and Jonathan Foreman. The album boasts a well-produced, radio-ready sheen unheard since Phillips' days with Toad the Wet Sprocket.

It includes the debut single "Thankful", which was Phillips' first radio release for a major label since Toad the Wet Sprocket's 1997 release Coil. However, the song was pulled from radio following a slow start and "Duck And Cover" was pushed to stations as the album's first single.

After being in stores only a few months Lost Highway dropped promotion for the album mid-tour and Glen Phillips asked to be let out of his record deal to create the quiet, and less radio-geared "Mr. Lemons".

== Track listing ==
All songs written by Glen Phillips, except where noted otherwise.

1. "Duck and Cover" – 3:23
2. "Thankful" – 2:59
3. "Courage" – 3:30
4. "Released" (Phillips, Dan Wilson) – 4:04
5. "Cleareyed" (Phillips, Wilson) – 3:59
6. "Falling" – 3:15
7. "Half-Life" – 4:14
8. "True" (Phillips, Wilson) – 3:14
9. "Easier" – 3:18
10. "Finally Fading" – 3:27
11. "Simple" – 4:05
12. "Gather" – 3:10
13. "Don't Need Anything" – 2:35

== Personnel ==
- Glen Phillips – vocals, guitars
- John Fields – keyboards, guitars, countless other noises, bass (1, 10)
- Dan Wilson – Wurlitzer electric piano (8), slide guitar (8)
- Mike Busbee – acoustic piano (10, 13), organ (10, 13)
- John Brion – guitars (1, 6), toy piano (6), guitar solo (6)
- Michael Chaves – guitars (2, 7, 9, 11, 12)
- Greg Suran – guitars (3–5, 8, 10), mandolin (5)
- Eric Heywood – pedal steel guitar (11)
- Jim Anton – bass (2–9, 11–13)
- Pete Thomas – drums, percussion
- Ken Chastain – percussion (9, 10, 12)
- Stevie Blacke – cello (3)
- Brian Gallagher – saxophone (7)
- Tom Scott – mouth tabla (9)
- Jon Foreman – backing vocals (1)
- Kristin Mooney – backing vocals (1, 3, 11)
- Andy Sturmer – backing vocals (1, 2, 6)
- Ben Folds – backing vocals (3)
- Mike Ruekberg – backing vocals (10)

=== Production ===
- Kim Buie – A&R
- John Fields – producer, engineer, mixing (10)
- Steven Miller – engineer, mixing (4, 6, 7, 9–13)
- Chris Testa – additional recording
- Bob Clearmountain – mixing (1–3, 5, 8)
- Robert Hadley – mastering
- Doug Sax – mastering
- The Mastering Lab (Hollywood, California)
- Bethany Newman – art direction, design
- Laurel Phillips – painting
- Dana Tynan – photography
- A2 Management – management
