= Love Songs, Werewolves, & Zombies =

Studio album by The Dollyrots
- Released: February 25, 2014
- Recorded: 2013
- Genre: Acoustic, Punk
- Label: Arrested Youth Records
- Producer: Luis Cabezas, Kelly Ogden

The Dollyrots chronology
The Dollyrots (2012)	Love Songs, Werewolves, & Zombies (2014)	Family Vacation: Live in Los Angeles (2016)

Love Songs, Werewolves, & Zombies is the sixth studio album by American pop-punk band The Dollyrots. It was released on Arrested Youth Records, February 25, 2014. Originally a private collection of songs written for fans, the album was initially given away to PledgeMusic supporters and eventually publicly released digitally and on CD.

== Track listing ==
All tracks are written by The Dollyrots.

No.	Title	Length
1.	"Hyperactive (Acoustic)"	2:35
2.	"Rather Be A Zombie"	2:42
3.	"Smile Smile Smile"	3:06
4.	"Anarchy & Disney"	3:17
5.	"Where Is Johnny Retsched"	2:16
6.	"Kari Equals Hottie"	3:05
7.	"Punk Rock Werewolf"	2:10
8.	"To The Moon"	2:47
9.	"Emo Cthulhu"	2:46
10.	"U.S.S.A."	3:06
11.	"Another Door Is Opening"	3:40
12.	"Keeping Up With Barry"	2:29
13.	"Be My Leia"	2:47
14.	"$100 Milf"	2:40
15.	"Won't Let Go"	3:20
