= Because I'm Awesome =

Studio album by The Dollyrots
- Released: March 13, 2007
- Recorded: The Dog House (Woodland Hills, CA), Encore B (Burbank, CA), Big Brown Sound (Woodland Hills, CA), Seedy Underbelly (Valley Village, CA)
- Genre: Punk rock
- Length: 40:41
- Label: Blackheart Records
- Producer: John Fields, Jacques Wait

The Dollyrots chronology
Eat My Heart Out (2004)	Because I'm Awesome (2007)	A Little Messed Up (2010)

Professional ratings
Review scores
Source	Rating
Melodic	3/5 stars

Because I'm Awesome is the second studio album by the American punk band The Dollyrots. It was released on March 13, 2007 on Blackheart Records.

Tracks featured in TV shows include "Because I'm Awesome", featured on Ugly Betty and "Watch Me Go (Kissed Me, Killed Me)", featured on The Simple Life. The song "Because I'm Awesome" was also featured in a back-to-school commercial for Kohl's department store as well as the 2008 film The Sisterhood of the Traveling Pants 2. The band performed "Because I'm Awesome" on an episode of Greek as well.

== Reception ==
Rick Anderson on Allmusic rated the album four stars out of five. Anderson described the album as "the same tight, gleefully snotty bubblegum punk as what you heard on Eat My Heart Out, except maybe just a bit bigger and just a bit sonically fuller this time around – par for the course when a band like this starts to mature and gets the budget of an established label behind it." Lana Cooper on website PopMatters awarded the album eight out of ten, describing the band's sound as "the same as it ever was, with clever, catchy lyrics running around a track of straightforward, chugging pop-punk". In a positive review, Bill James on website Monsters and Critics said that "the album as a whole is more than can be described in any one track" and that it contained "fun, rollicking songs, often laced with a political barb and punk attitude to create a unique sound".

== Track listing ==
All tracks are written by The Dollyrots except where noted.

No.	Title	Length
1.	"Because I'm Awesome"	3:20
2.	"My Best Friend's Hot"	3:09
3.	"Out of L.A."	3:13
4.	"Brand New Key" (Melanie Safka)	2:52
5.	"Hysteria"	3:00
6.	"A Desperate S.O.S."	2:55
7.	"Watch Me Go (Kissed Me, Killed Me)"	3:10
8.	"This Crush"	3:36
9.	"Cat Calling"	3:09
10.	"17"	2:36
11.	"Nobody Wants U"	3:51
12.	"Turn You Down"	3:08
13.	"Tummy Tum Tum"	2:42

Enhanced footage
No.	Title	Length
1.	"Tokyopop Out of L.A video"
2.	"SXSW video"

Japanese edition bonus tracks
No.	Title	Length
14.	"Kick Me to the Curb"	2:55
15.	"Goodnight Tonight"	3:20

Digital edition bonus tracks
No.	Title	Length
14.	"Boom Room"	1:53
15.	"Rebel Angel"	2:40

== Personnel ==
The following people worked on the album:

The Dollyrots

- Kelly Ogden – vocals, bass, spoons
- Luis Cabezas – guitar, vocals, piano
- Amy Wood – drums

Other musicians

- Melanie Cabezas – additional backing vocals
- Chris Black – additional backing vocals
- Jimmy Coup – additional backing vocals
- Kenny Laguna – additional backing vocals

Production

- John Fields – producer, recording, mixing
- Chris Testa – recording
- Steven Miller – mixing
- Jacques Wait – producer, recording, mixing, preproduction/demos
- Kenny Laguna – additional production
- Derek Bramble – recording
- Luis Cabezas – additional production
- Greg Calbi – mastering

Cover

- Steve Dixey – cover artwork
- Robert Jones – bunny illustration
- Carianne Laguna – layout/design
- Jed Luczynski – back tray photo
- Sonja Pacho – inside photo
