= A Little Messed Up =

Studio album by The Dollyrots
- Released: August 17, 2010
- Recorded: Would Work Sound (Studio City, CA), The Greenhouse (Los Angeles, CA), Stagg Street Studio (Van Nuys, CA), Hotel Wilshere (Los Angeles, CA), Studio Deluxe/Sound City Studios (Van Nuys, CA), Kingsize (Silverlake, CA)
- Genre: Punk rock
- Length: 42:57
- Label: Blackheart Records
- Producer: Chris Testa, Matt Wallace, Evan Frankfort, Fred Archambault, Luis Cabezas

The Dollyrots chronology
Because I'm Awesome (2007)	A Little Messed Up (2010)	The Dollyrots (2012)

A Little Messed Up is the third studio album by pop-punk band The Dollyrots. It was released on August 17, 2010 on Blackheart Records.

== Reception ==
The Allmusic review by Tim Sendra awarded the album 3.5 stars stating "The Dollyrots' third album takes the California trio one step further away from the punky sound of their 2004 debut record on Lookout and toward the mainstream... Many of the songs are uptempo and almost fiery, but on the whole, the record is more cuddly than dangerous. Basically, they've tipped the balance on the pop-punk scale completely to the pop side, and anyone looking for a record that has some bite or holds any surprises might want to look elsewhere. And if you were a fan of the earlier Dollyrots albums, you may be a bit disappointed by the direction they've taken. Having said that, A Little Messed Up isn't a bad record."

Writing for Pop Matters, critic Lana Cooper said "the Dollyrots continue their mission as purveyors of peppy pop punk." and gave the album a 7/10 rating.

Professional ratings
Review scores
Source	Rating
Allmusic	3.5/5 stars

== Track listing ==
All tracks are written by Luis Cabezas and Kelly Ogden except where noted

No.	Title	Length
1.	"Rock Control" (Cabezas, Ogden, Evan Frankfort)	3:43
2.	"Some Girls" (Cabezas, Ogden, Dave Bassett)	3:41
3.	"California Beach Boy" (Cabezas, Ogden, Tina Parol)	3:17
4.	"Rollercoaster" (Cabezas, Ogden, Fred Archambault)	3:47
5.	"My Heart Explodes" (Cabezas, Ogden, Bassett)	3:12
6.	"A Little Messed Up"	3:21
7.	"Pour Tous Jours"	3:14
8.	"Big Mouth"	2:55
9.	"California"	3:13
10.	"Coming After You"	2:48
11.	"Let's Be In Love"	3:47
12.	"Just Like Chocolate"	2:53
13.	"Om Nom Nom"	3:14

iTunes exclusive bonus tracks
No.	Title	Length
14.	"Happy Together" (Garry Bonner, Alan Gordon)	3:21
15.	"Dream Lover" (Bobby Darin)	2:19

== Personnel ==
The following people worked on the album:

The Dollyrots

- Kelly Ogden – bass, vocals
- Luis Cabezas – guitar, vocals
- Chris Black – drums

Other musicians

- Kim Shattuck – guest vocals on "Some Girls"
- Andy Cabezas – background vocals and percussion
- Eddie Vasquez – background vocals and percussion
- Chris Testa – background vocals and percussion
- Fred Archambault – background vocals and percussion
- Amy Wood – additional drums/percussion

Production

- Chris Testa – producer, engineer, mixing
- Matt Wallace – producer, engineer, mixing
- Evan Frankfort – producer, engineer, mixing
- Fred Archambault – producer, engineer, mixing
- Luis Cabezas – producer, engineer, mixing
- Sylvia Massy – mixing, engineer
- Jorge Valasco – assistant engineer and editing
- Ken Sluiter – digital editing
- Rich Veltrop – assistant engineer and editing
- Steve Fallone – mastering
- Will Kennedy – assistant engineer

Design

- James Jaeger – photography
- Carianne Brinkman – layout
- Gabe Godin – layout
