= Peace Kehd =

Album by The Doppelgangaz

Studio album by The Doppelgangaz
- Released: February 18, 2014
- Recorded: 2013; The Brothel (New York City)
- Genre: Hip hop
- Label: Groggy Pack Entertainment
- Producer: The Doppelgangaz

The Doppelgangaz chronology
HARK! (2013)	Peace Kehd (2014)

Singles from Peace Kehd
- 1. "Holla x2" Released: December 11, 2013; 2. "KnowntchooTahLie" Released: February 4, 2014

Peace Kehd is the fourth studio album by American hip hop duo The Doppelgangaz. The album was released on February 18, 2014 by their label Groggy Pack Entertainment. Peace Kehd's production and mixing was entirely handled by the duo. It was supported by the single "Holla x2". The standard version of the album contains eleven tracks, with the deluxe version containing seven instrumental versions of the songs on the album.

== Background and promotion ==
On December 11, 2013, The Doppelgangaz released "Holla x2", the first single from their fourth studio album. The single was premiered by Vice. Along with its release, it was revealed the album would be titled Peace Kehd and be released on February 18, 2014. It was also reported that the album would be produced and mixed by the duo, along with being released by their own label Groggy Pack Entertainment, like their previous releases.

The duo stated that the album explores the "duality" of the black cloak lifestyle. On January 15, 2014, the music video was released for "Holla x2". The video was shot in New York City, New York. On February 4, 2014, the album's second single "KnowntchooTahLie" was premiered by XXL and subsequently made purchasable via the album pre-order on iTunes and Bandcamp. On February 10, 2014, the duo released the album for free stream via their SoundCloud account. On February 14, 2014, the music video for "KnowntchooTahLie" was premiered via The A.V. Club.

== Critical reception ==
Professional ratings
Review scores
Source	Rating
Exclaim!	7/10
HipHopDX	4/5 stars
The Line of Best Fit	7/10 stars
Wordplay	3.5/5 stars
XXL	3/5 (L)

Upon its release, Peace Kehd was met with generally positive reviews from music critics. Jordan Lebeau of XXL said, "Backed by nostalgic production, EP and Matter Ov Fact rhyme well and exhibit a great level of chemistry on the mic. Upon numerous listens, you get the feeling it sounds more like a compilation of never before released Camp Lo and Mobb Deep cuts than something original. However, the duo does venture outside the NY golden-era blueprint such as “KnowntchooTahLie,” which is one of the better songs on the LP." Daryl Keating writing for Exclaim! stated, "Even if the reiterations and sexual focus drag Peace Kehd down a few notches, the Doppelgangaz still have some slick production holding up the album. Aside from a couple of so-so, club-friendly tracks, the record is beautifully produced, particularly the short interlude songs." William Donovan of HipHopDX said, "With quality production to offset the sometimes repetitive themes in their obscene raps, Peace Kehd is another enjoyable listen from The Doppelgangaz."

Adam Chester of Wordplay said, "Overall, Peace Kehd is highly solid. Covering both highs and lows, it showcases the Doppelgangaz’ ever developing emotional range, and their ability to churn out quality albums at an alarming speed." Sam Willis of The Line of Best Fit stated, "When all is said and done, Peace Kehd is still very much centred around trademark East Coast production. However, it does show flickers of the often condemned new school of thought, which is bound to get it some deprecation from someone. Many hip hop fans may be quite happy with being stuck in the 90s, but it’s encouraging to see a group trying to merge the successes of that time with something fresher once more."

== Track listing ==
- All songs were produced by The Doppelgangaz.

No.	Title	Length
1.	"Peace In"	1:35
2.	"Holla x2"	3:54
3.	"Shit Rock"	5:32
4.	"KnowntchooTahLie"	3:29
5.	"$ In Da Air"	1:41
6.	"Live Rugged"	4:07
7.	"Ungodly" (featuring Big Josh)	4:07
8.	"Come Down Awn Eht"	5:07
9.	"What's Your 20"	3:24
10.	"Fall Thru"	3:36
11.	"Peace Out"	1:18
