= Bowling for Soup Presents: One Big Happy! =

2012 studio album by Bowling for Soup, The Dollyrots and Patent Pending

Studio album by Bowling for Soup / The Dollyrots / Patent Pending
- Released: September 25, 2012
- Recorded: 2012
- Genre: Pop-punk
- Length: 31:47
- Labels: Brando, Que-so
- Producers: Jaret Reddick; Linus of Hollywood; Jordan Schmidt

Bowling for Soup chronology
| The Dollyrots vs. Bowling for Soup (2011) | Bowling for Soup Presents: One Big Happy! (2012) | Lunch. Drunk. Love. (2013) |

The Dollyrots chronology
| The Dollyrots (2012) | Bowling for Soup Presents: One Big Happy! (2012) | Barefoot and Pregnant (2014) |

Patent Pending chronology
| Second Family (2011) | Bowling for Soup Presents: One Big Happy! (2012) | Brighter (2013) |

Professional ratings
Review scores
| Source | Rating |
|---|---|
| AllMusic | 4/5 stars |

Bowling for Soup Presents: One Big Happy! is a split album by pop punk bands Bowling for Soup, The Dollyrots, and Patent Pending, released on September 25, 2012, through Brando and Que-so Records. The album contains four original tracks, with each band also covering two of one another's songs. The album was made to promote the UK tour of the same name.

The Dollyrots' version of "The Bitch Song" was included in Ubisoft's Rocksmith+ in 2022.

== Track listing ==
Adapted from Apple Music.

One Big Happy!
| No. | Title | Writer(s) | Performer | Length |
|---|---|---|---|---|
| 1. | "Let's Go To The Pub" | Jaret Reddick, Linus of Hollywood | Bowling for Soup | 2:33 |
| 2. | "The Bitch Song" (Bowling for Soup cover) | Reddick | The Dollyrots | 3:23 |
| 3. | "Shut Up and Smile" (Bowling for Soup cover) | Reddick, Zac Maloy | Patent Pending | 4:09 |
| 4. | "Just Like All The Rest" | Kelly Ogden, Luis Cabezas, Reddick, Linus of Hollywood | The Dollyrots | 2:42 |
| 5. | "My Heart Explodes" (The Dollyrots cover) | Ogden, Cabezas, Dave Bassett | Bowling for Soup | 2:59 |
| 6. | "Hyperactive" (The Dollyrots cover) | Ogden, Cabezas, John Fields | Patent Pending | 2:09 |
| 7. | "Psycho In Love" | Joseph Ragosta, Joshua Dicker | Patent Pending | 2:53 |
| 8. | "Spin Me Around" (Patent Pending cover) | Ragosta, Dicker, Jordan Schmidt | Bowling for Soup | 3:43 |
| 9. | "Little Miss Impossible" (Patent Pending cover) | Ragosta, Dicker | The Dollyrots | 3:08 |
| 10. | "Love Ya, Love Ya, Love Ya" | Reddick, Amie Miriello | Kelly Ogden & Jaret Reddick | 4:03 |
| Total length: | | | | 31:47 |

== Personnel ==
Bowling for Soup

- Jaret Reddick - lead vocals, rhythm guitar
- Chris Burney – lead guitar, vocals
- Erik Chandler – bass guitar, vocals
- Gary Wiseman – drums, vocals

The Dollyrots

- Kelly Ogden – lead vocals, bass guitar
- Luis Cabezas – guitar, vocals

Patent Pending

- Joseph Ragosta – lead vocals
- Rob Felicetti – guitar, vocals
- Corey DeVincenzo – bass guitar
- Marc Kantor – guitar
- Anthony Mingoia – drums

Production

- Jarinus (Jaret Reddick & Linus of Hollywood) – co-producers (1, 5, 8, 10)
- Linus of Hollywood – producer (2, 4, 9)
- Jordan Schmidt – producer (3, 6, 7)

== Charts ==
| Chart (2012) | Peak position |
|---|---|
| UK Compilation Albums (Official Charts) | 92 |
