= The Doppelgangaz =

American Hip-Hop group

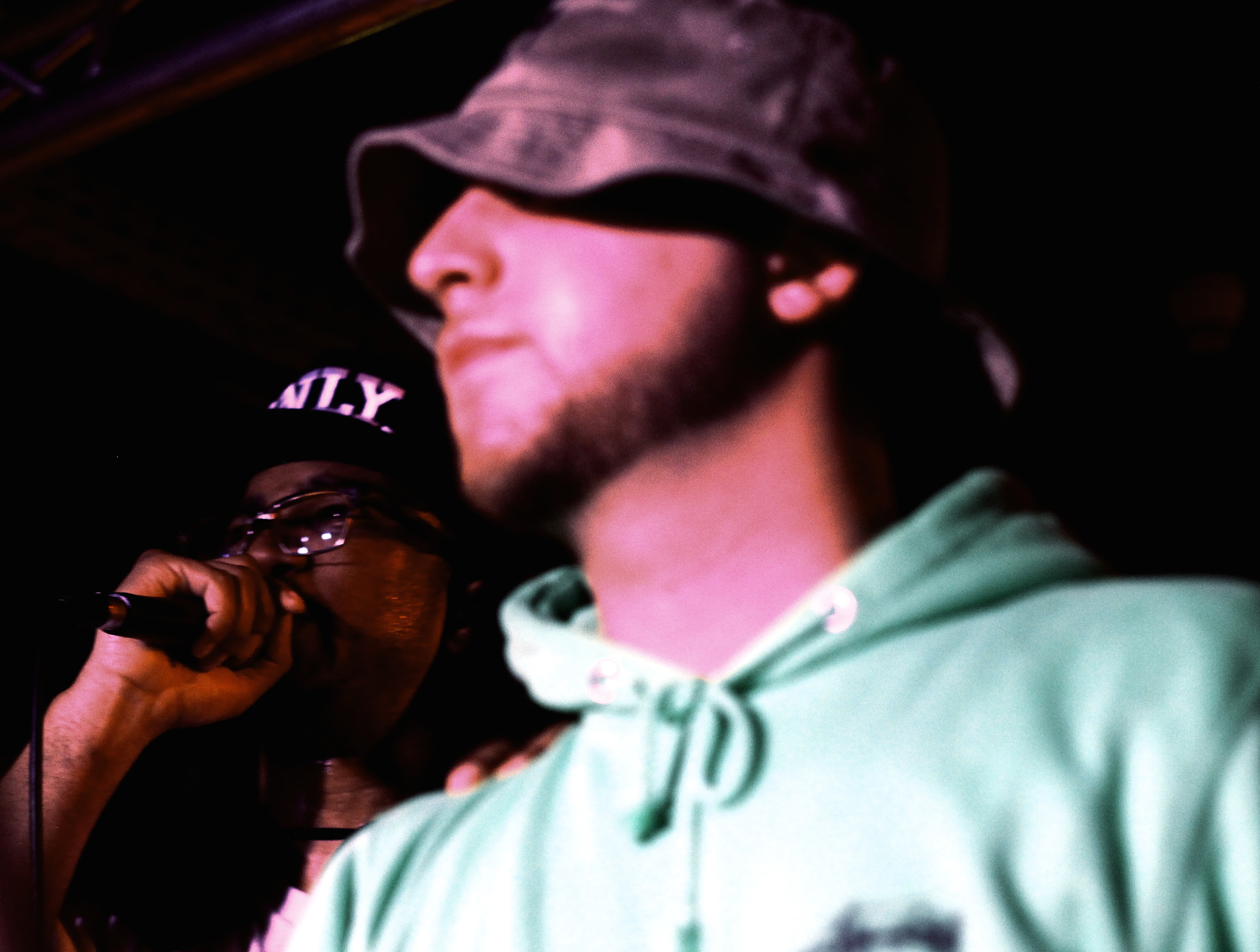
- The Doppelgangaz in 2014

Background information
- Origin: Orange County, New York, U.S.
- Genres: Hip hop
- Years active: 2008 - present
- Label: Groggy Pack Entertainment LLC
- Members: Matter Ov Fact; EP
- Website: www.thedoppelgangaz.com

The Doppelgangaz is an American rap duo from Orange County, New York consisting of rapper/producer Matter Ov Fact and rapper/producer EP. They have released nineteen full-length albums (nine of which are primarily instrumental) and fourteen EPs.

The group was included on Raw Roots' "Top Underground Artists Of 2011" list. They were featured in Europe's biggest Hip-Hop magazine Juice in support of their 2011 album Lone Sharks. In 2012, the group was covered in the major American Hip-Hop magazine XXL in its "The Break" section, which highlights up and coming Hip-Hop acts.

== History ==
=== Early years and musical beginnings (1998-2007) ===
The duo of Matter Ov Fact (Matthew Bennett) and EP (Eric Sakla) have been friends since childhood. In a 2012 interview with HipHopDX, Matter Ov Fact stated:

“EP and I have been buds for years. We grew up together, but it wasn’t always about music. Back in 1998 was when we decided that we wanted to do music. As things progressed, we got official equipment and decided to keep moving forward. But yeah, we’ve been cool since probably first grade, but the birth of The Doppelgangaz took place around 2008, and between 2009 and 2011 is when we got to go balls deep and that’s what we plan to do from here on out.”

Before branching off to form The Doppelgangaz, the two were collectively involved in another project. It was during this period where the idea to separate into their own group formed. EP recalled:

“We were in a bigger group, which was active from the early to mid-2000s, but you know, life happens. We were the younger ones of the group so it just eventually became all Doppgang, you know? We don’t have kids and we don’t have any responsibility. We’re just reckless nomads, so we just had the time to do it.”

Matter Ov Fact added:

“Plus we just think on the same wavelength and it just made sense to do our own thing and continue on. That’s where the name comes from. The word doppelganger means a ghastly duplicate, and we see ourselves as when it comes to this here music.”

=== The Doppelgangaz (2008-present) ===
The group has become known for wearing cloaks while performing and embracing the "vagrant" lifestyle of frequenting brothels, inebriation, cheap clothing, dumpster diving and being nomadic in their music. They have developed a strong cult following in European countries such as Germany, France, Belgium, the Netherlands, Switzerland, England, Sweden, Spain and also in Australia.

The group's 2011 release Lone Sharks has received widespread critical acclaim for its production being reminiscent of the "raw", gritty style that was the iconic sound of east coast New York Hip-Hop in the mid 1990s. Their rapping and lyrics have also been complimented for their unique subject matter, tone and imagery. HipHopDX gave the album and group high praise, stating:

"[The album is] entirely devoid of lyrical features and produced entirely by themselves, Lone Sharks showcases two young emcees who also double as producers and appear to have a bright future ahead of their dark cloaks. Production is laid-back yet sinister, conjuring up memories of the early-to-mid nineties. Flows are abstract and rhyme schemes complex, with both lyricists showing an impressive grasp of vocabulary. A subtle static surrounds most of the tracks, an undoubtedly intentional executive decision, leaving the overall sound unpolished and raw. Trends are shunned by The Doppelgangaz as they seem to follow no rules, carefully walking the thin line between individuality and gimmick, emerging victorious on the side of remaining distinct without setting their own expiration date."

In 2012, they released an instrumental album Beats For Brothels, Vol. 2, they followed that with their third studio album HARK! in 2013. On February 18, 2014, the duo released their fourth studio album Peace Kehd.

On July 7, 2017, they released their fifth studio album Dopp Hopp. They released their sixth studio album AAAAGGGHH on May 11, 2018. This was followed by a multitude of singles, EPs & instrumental projects.

The group released their seventh album Black Cloak Lifestyle in 2022.

== Discography ==
=== Studio albums ===
- 2012: The New Beginning (2009)
- Rhyme Over Beats (2010)
- Beats for Brothels, Vol. 1 (2011)
- Lone Sharks (2011)
- Beats for Brothels, Vol. 2 (2012)
- Hark (2013)
- Peace Kehd (2014)
- Beats for Brothels, Vol. 3 (2015)
- Beats for Brothels, Vol. 3.5 (2016)
- Dopp Hopp (2017)
- AAAAGGGHH (2018)
- Beats for Brothels, Vol. 4 (2018)
- Dumpster Dive (2020)
- Beats for Brothels, Vol. 5 (2020)
- Black Cloak Lifestyle (2022)
- Beats for Brothels, Vol. 6 (2023)
- Beats for Brothels, Vol. 7 (2024)
- Dumpster Dive, Vol. 2 (2025)
- Beats for Brothels, Vol. 8 (2025)

=== Extended plays ===
- The Ghastly Duo EP (2008)
- Doppic of Discussion (2012)
- Parts Unknown (2015)
- Speak Awn Eht (2015)
- G Pack, Vol. 1 (2019)
- G Pack, Vol. 2 (2020)
- G Pack, Vol. 3 (2021)
- Went Left (2023)
- Chillhop Beat Tapes: The Doppelgangaz (2023)
- G Pack, Vol. 4 (2023)
- G Pack, Vol. 5 (2024)
- G Pack, Vol. 6 (2024)
- Still Left (2025)
- Bet on Black Cloak (2025)
