= The Dollyrots =

American pop punk band

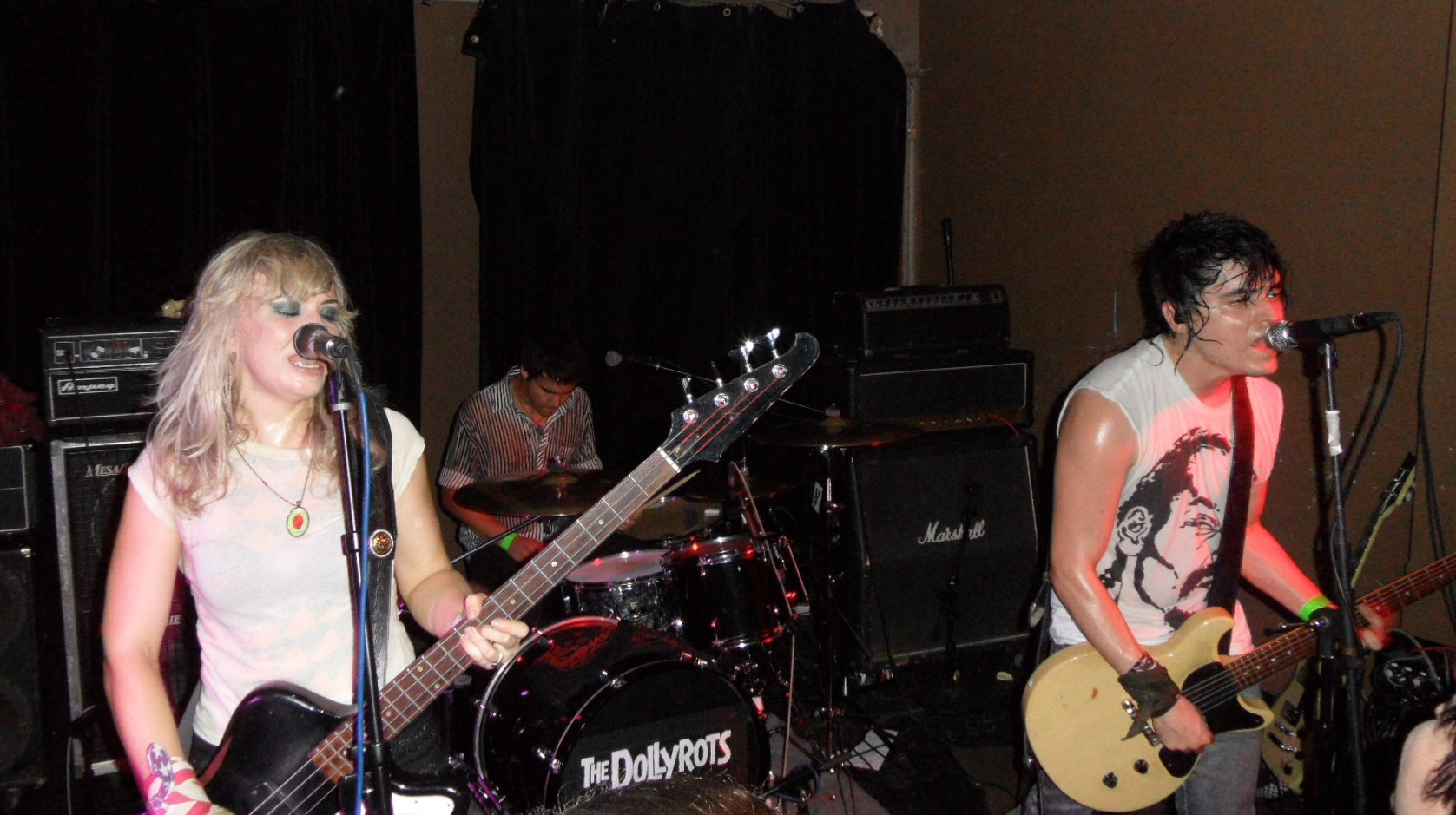
- From left to right: Kelly Ogden, James Carman, and Luis Cabezas.

Background information
- Also known as: No Chef (2000–2001)
- Origin: Sarasota, Florida, United States
- Genres: Punk rock, pop punk
- Years active: 2000–present
- Labels: Blackheart; Lookout!; Panic Button; Arrested Youth; Wicked Cool
- Members: Kelly Ogden; Luis Cabezas; Simon Hancock
- Past members: Josh Harrold; Mike Benbow; Frank Beasley; Josh Valenti; Amy Wood; Chris Black; Alicia Warrington; James Carman; Stacy Jones; Aixa Vilar; Mel Funk; Mickey Richards; Rikki Styxx; Justin McGrath; Noah Levy
- Website: www.dollyrots.com

The Dollyrots are an American punk rock band formed in 2000, composed of Kelly Ogden (bass, lead vocals) and Luis Cabezas (guitars, backing vocals). They have released nine studio albums under Panic Button (part of Lookout! Records), Joan Jett's Blackheart Records, Little Steven's Wicked Cool Records, and their own label Arrested Youth Records.

== Biography ==
=== Formation ===
Bassist/lead vocalist Kelly Ogden and guitarist Luis Cabezas have known each other since meeting in the eighth grade in Land o' Lakes, Florida. They both attended New College of Florida where they formed a band called No Chef with friends Josh Harrold and Mike Benbow. Ogden and Cabezas played the guitar while Harrold was the bassist/lead vocalist and Benbow was the drummer. Cabezas described the subject matter of their songs as being "about ninjas, zombies and Charles Manson."

After being disillusioned with the results of the 2000 United States presidential election, Ogden and Cabezas decided to make the band full-time. As Ogden recalls:

We were watching the 2000 presidential election results, and at four o'clock in the morning, when we found out that George W. Bush had won, Luis and I were like, "The world's probably gonna end anyway, and I don't want to go to med school," so we thought, "Let's just do the band," says Ogden. "So that's when it happened. We had no future anyways, so let's just be in a rock band!"

Josh Harrold did not want to become a full-time musician so he left the band. Ogden took over his duties on bass and lead vocals. Mike Benbow left and was replaced by Frank Beasley. The band then changed their name to The Dollyrots. The band left Florida and visited various cities across the U.S., finally settling in Los Angeles in January 2002. Ogden described Los Angeles as having "everything we needed—record labels, venues, other bands. It seemed like the right place." Beasley left the band and was replaced by Josh Valenti.

=== Eat My Heart Out and Panic Button/Lookout! Records ===
In 2003 the band self-recorded and released the EP Feed Me, Pet Me. Responding to a blind audition call The Dollyrots were selected to appear in a Hewlett-Packard advertisement featuring the song "Feed Me, Pet Me" which led to signing a publishing deal with Windswept Pacific Music. After meeting producer John Fields at the commercial recording session the band recorded their debut studio album Eat My Heart Out soon thereafter at Capitol Studio B with Fields at the helm. Initially self-released, the album was put into rotation on L.A.'s Indie 103.1 along with spins on Rodney Bingenheimer's show on KROQ. This attracted the attention of labels, and ultimately The Dollyrots signed a deal with Panic Button (under Lookout! Records) in July 2004 to widely release Eat My Heart Out. Josh Valenti left in early 2004, replaced by Amy Wood of Get Set Go. Eat My Heart Out was released by Panic Button/Lookout! Records on September 28, 2004.

The Dollyrots spent the majority of 2004-2006 touring the U.S., headlining dates and playing alongside Groovie Ghoulies, Shonen Knife, The Breeders, The Queers, Soul Asylum, Paramore, Bang Sugar Bang, The Soviettes, The Shocker, and Teenage Bottlerocket while also playing the Lookout! Records 2005 CMJ showcase.

The band co-starred and played two songs in the "Stuck on You" episode of CSI: NY in February 2006, with Ogden playing a role involving a murder committed with a bass guitar.

=== Blackheart Records and Because I'm Awesome ===
The band started work on their second album at Seedy Underbelly Studios in Los Angeles with producer Jacques Wait in February 2006 but were forced to find a new label due to problems with Lookout! Records. Kelly Ogden stated: "We started recording and then had everything ready. Then Lookout! went out of business for all intents and purposes. They had troubles with Green Day and financial problems, and so they pretty much told all of us that we had to go find a new label." This collection of songs, at the time titled More Biting Please, was never released although several tracks were eventually included on the ensuing album.

The band reentered the studio in Spring 2006 and finished what would become Because I'm Awesome at The Doghouse Studio with John Fields as producer. While on Vans Warped Tour later that summer Ogden gave a copy of the band's self-released EP Love and Revolt to Joan Jett, the co-founder of Blackheart Records who had taken a liking to the band while on the tour. Ogden also gave copies of the disc to NOFX's Fat Mike and Laura Jane Grace of Against Me! but did not receive a response. Drummer Amy Wood left the band shortly thereafter. Wood suggested that Ogden and Cabezas ask mutual friend Chris Black to replace her. With the album already tracked and mixed, Blackheart contacted the band a few weeks later and signed The Dollyrots in December 2006.

Their second album, Because I'm Awesome, was released on March 13, 2007, through Blackheart Records and coincided with an appearance at South By Southwest where the band played "I Love Rock & Roll" on stage with Jett. A review in the webzine PopMatters noted that "the Dollyrots' sound is the same as it ever was, with clever, catchy lyrics running around a track of straightforward, chugging pop-punk" while the title track was described with the words "A hit song is what separates one band from thousands of others. The Dollyrots gained acclaim with their song 'Because I'm Awesome'. It's an appropriate tune for the sardonic pop punk band from Los Angeles to gain entry onto music's national stage." (Tim Parsons, Tahoe Daily Tribune, 2008). "Because I'm Awesome" went on to be featured in a Kohl's commercial during the fall of 2007 where the band made an appearance, with the premise of inspiring teenagers to pick up instruments and start a band. The Dollyrots appeared as themselves on the ABC Family TV show Greek, playing "Because I'm Awesome" on screen in the "Multiple Choice" episode. The band also guested on Fuse TV's The Sauce and embarked on a long series of live shows throughout the United States including Los Angeles Pride, Hudson River Rocks, the Del Mar Fair, and Warped Tour. The band opened for Joan Jett and the Blackhearts, Adolescents, The Methadones, Peelander-Z, and labelmates The Vacancies during this time.

2008 saw the band continue to tour the United States extensively, opening for TheStart, Shonen Knife and Paramore while once again playing Warped Tour along with Summerfest and the BMI showcase at South by Southwest. The band also recorded a cover of Joan Jett's "Bad Reputation" with John Fields for the Endless Bummer movie soundtrack.

=== A Little Messed Up ===
In January 2009 the band began pre-production with producer Chris Testa for their third album, A Little Messed Up. The majority of the album was recorded between March–June 2009 in Los Angeles at Stagg Street Studios and featured Chris Black and Amy Wood on drums. It marked the first time Cabezas assumed production and recording duties, contributing elements to many of the tracks. Kim Shattuck from The Muffs sang backup vocals on the song "Some Girls".

A Little Messed Up was the band's third album, and the second to be released on Blackheart Records. In addition to Testa and Cabezas the album featured mixing and production by Sylvia Massy and Fred Archambault along with co-writes by Evan Frankfort, Dave Bassett, and Tina Parol.

The Dollyrots toured with The Action Design in the Western U.S. in May 2009 and on their own throughout the rest of the country for the rest of the year. These dates included support slots for The Donnas, Kay Hanley, and The Muffs along with appearances at South by Southwest, Girls Rock Camp, and Long Beach Pride.

Having met comedian and TV host Drew Carey in late 2009 when Chris Black appeared on the show as a performing drummer, The Dollyrots were invited to debut their Matt Wallace produced 7 inch single "California Beach Boy" with a feature performance during the Showcase Showdown on the CBS game show The Price Is Right airing on January 15, 2010.

The band supported Bowling For Soup's Eastern and Texas U.S. dates in mid 2010 and were selected to open for Buzzcocks on their 22 date North American tour in May/June 2010.

After some delays A Little Messed Up was released by Blackheart on August 17, 2010. The album gained favorable reviews, with AbsolutePunk calling it a "Blow Pop of flavors with a crunchy, delectable casing of pop-punk and a heart of bubble gum poppy lyrics." This was followed by supporting a reunited Screeching Weasel in Los Angeles on September 19, 2010, at Club Nokia and opening for Bowling for Soup on their Just Can't Get Rid of Us UK tour in October 2010.

The band was presented with an award for "Best New Breakout Band" by the American Society of Young Musicians in Los Angeles on October 27, 2010.

After a headlining early 2011 U.S. tour the band went on to support Bowling For Soup on their Spring 2011 U.S. tour and played six dates supporting The Go-Go's on their Ladies Gone Wild Tour in May/June. In August, they again supported Bowling For Soup on a West US tour and played a handful of dates on the Vans Warped Tour.

A video for the single Rollercoaster made its debut during a show at The Troubadour in Los Angeles and was released on April 25, 2011.

The Dollyrots left Blackheart Records in July 2011 with the intention of establishing their own label to release future work.

=== The Arrested Youth EP ===
On August 9, 2011, the band released an EP, Arrested Youth, on their own label, Arrested Youth Records. The EP was produced by American hip-hop producer Neal Pogue and marked a departure for the band stylistically and, according to Ogden, had "a rawer sound".

=== The Dollyrots ===
The Dollyrots decided that their next album would also be released on their own record label. On September 12, 2011, the band launched a crowdsourcing campaign on Kickstarter to raise money for the production and release of the album in which they received their goal within one day and went on a month later to make almost five times the goal of money raised, supported entirely by fans. The album was produced and recorded by longtime collaborator John Fields with significant engineering contributions by Cabezas and featured co-writes with Kay Hanley and Martin Harrington.

On November 30, 2011, it was announced drummer Chris Black was parting ways with the band after 5 years, making him the longest Dollyrots member to hold that title. In a YouTube video on December 11, 2011, Kelly introduced Alicia Warrington as the band's new drummer.

In May 2012 the band's song "Because I'm Awesome" appeared in the TV trailer for Disney's Brave.

In June 2012 The Dollyrots contributed a new song, "Super Mega Ultraviolet" to the compilation Crappy Records Presents: Have A Crappy Summer. The album also featured songs by Bowling For Soup, Nerf Herder, Allstar Weekend and MC Lars.

In August 2012, Ogden revealed that Warrington had left to drum full-time for singer Chris Rene. The Dollyrots released their self-titled album, The Dollyrots, on September 18, 2012, as a duo along with a music video for the first single "Hyperactive". The band launched the release with shows at The Troubadour and Bootleg Theatre in Los Angeles and an IAMA on Reddit.

For their forthcoming tour of the U.S with Prima Donna and U.K tour supporting Bowling For Soup the band enlisted drummer James Carman from the band The Images. Prior to the tour the band entered the studio with producer Linus of Hollywood to record three songs for One Big Happy!, a split album with Bowling For Soup and Patent Pending, with the bands performing covers of each other's songs, released on September 25, 2012. The three bands subsequently toured the UK together.

In November 2014 The Dollyrots were asked to create a theme song for The CW show Gallery Mallory. The resulting intro song was described as "catchy as hell and fits the show perfectly". The show debuted on CW seed in October 2013 and renamed Very Mallory.

Following extensive touring and appearances at both the 2013 NAMM Show and South by Southwest Music Conference and band revealed Ogden's pregnancy through a YouTube video.

=== Barefoot and Pregnant and the birth of River ===
The Dollyrots launched a PledgeMusic crowdsourcing project for their fifth studio album on September 19, 2013. The effort, later titled Barefoot and Pregnant, was written and recorded while Ogden was pregnant. Again enlisting John Fields to co-produce and mix, it was primarily tracked by Cabezas at the band's home studio. "The album is called 'Barefoot and Pregnant,' because that's what I was," Ogden said. "We wrote and recorded almost the entire album in our bedroom while I was pregnant. It was amazing and trying and crazy at times, but it definitely pushed us to learn new things and perform in a different way." Stacy Jones of Letters to Cleo provided drums for eleven of the tracks, while former drummer Amy Wood contributed to the remaining two.

Despite Ogden's pregnancy The Dollyrots played a short acoustic set at The Satellite in Los Angeles on August 8, 2013, to celebrate the premier of In Heaven There Is No Beer, a film starring the duo and documenting the local "Kiss Or Kill" rock scene of 2002 to 2007 that the band emerged from several years prior. The couple's first child, River Ogden Cabezas, was born November 25, 2013, in Los Angeles. Cabezas and Ogden announced the birth on Instagram.

The band released a digital-only acoustic album Love Songs, Werewolves, & Zombies exclusively to Pledgemusic supporters in late 2013. A public CD release followed in early 2014.

Barefoot and Pregnant was released through the band's own label on February 18, 2014, with a #7 debut on Billboard Magazine's Heatseekers Chart. Popmatters gave the album 7/10 stars, describing it as having "more variety and nuance here than ever before; jokey hardcore runs seamlessly into mid-tempo stomps and bad-girl anthems, all powered by Luis Cabezas' satisfyingly fuzzy guitars and delivered with an economy that would have made Dee Dee and the boys proud." The Dollyrots followed up the release with a West Coast run supporting Black Flag, an appearance at South-By-Southwest, and more headlining dates through 2014. Little Steven's Underground Garage named lead single "Come And Get It" the Coolest Song In The World for the week of April 13, 2014. Aixa Vilar from Go Betty Go played drums on these dates.

In August 2014 Kelly Ogden began a personal blog detailing her experiences as a mother in a rock band. The focus of the blog is the unique experiences faced when bringing a toddler on the road and raising a child as working musicians.

On July 28, 2014, The Dollyrots announced an October UK tour supporting Buzzcocks. Drummer Mickey Richards of People on Vacation joined the band for this three-week run.

The music video for single "Get Weird" reached #1 on Diffuser.fm's Top Ten Video Countdown on December 24, 2014.

=== Live In The USA PledgeMusic Campaign and U.S./U.K. tours ===
Following an early 2015 solo U.S. West Coast run, the band announced a full U.S. tour with Bowling For Soup and PledgeMusic campaign to create their first live concert album and film tentatively titled Live In the USA.

On July 29, 2015, The Dollyrots were announced as main support for Bowling For Soup's How About Another Round 2016 UK tour.

Live in the USA was retitled Family Vacation: Live in Los Angeles and filmed as a single concert film at the Roxy Theatre in Hollywood on September 19, 2015. The resulting 40 minute film was directed by Ian MacLeod and features cameos by former Dollyrots band members, most notably, drummer Chris Black and Bowling For Soup's Jaret Reddick. The concert's audio was recorded multi-track for the purpose of releasing as a live album, engineered by Cabezas and later edited, mixed, and mastered by Linus of Hollywood, Jay Ruston, and Paul Logus. Following a successful PledgeMusic Campaign whereby the band exceeded over 150% of their initial goal The Dollyrots signed with MVD Entertainment Group to distribute the 2-disc CD/DVD set.

Later in 2015 the band provided main support for Lita Ford at the Northern California Women's Music Festival and appeared at the 2015 FEST in Gainesville, Florida.

=== The Mama's Gonna Knock You Out EP ===
The Dollyrots recorded the 3-song Mama's Gonna Knock You Out EP in Van Nuys, California with longtime producer John Fields in October 2016. The EP was released January 29, 2016, both digitally and on CD to coincide with the beginning of the "How About Another Round" UK tour.

=== Family Vacation: Live in Los Angeles ===
Following a February 2016 tour of the United Kingdom The Dollyrots released their first ever concert film and companion live album, Family Vacation: Live in Los Angeles on March 11, 2016. The double-disc set reached #15 on Billboard Magazine's Heatseekers Chart in its first week of sales. (Note: Posted at 23:52h. ""Family Vacation" Debuts at #15 on Billboard!". The Dollyrots.) Punk News rated the album 4 out of 5 stars and made it a "Staff Pick", writing "The Dollyrots not only accomplish everything they did in the studio, they take it to the next level" and that the concert film and audio album "both not only work in standalone form, they work even better as complementary pieces."

=== Whiplash Splash ===
While expecting their second child in November 2016, Kelly and Luis started another PledgeMusic campaign to raise funds to record their sixth studio album. They returned to the studio with producer John Fields in early September to record Whiplash Splash. Kelly gave birth to Daisy Moon Cabezas on November 15, 2016.

Whiplash Splash was released on March 24, 2017, and reached number 13 on the Billboard Heatseekers Chart, with PledgeMusic supporters getting a digital download of it on February 24, 2017. A tour to promote Whiplash Splash, with The Two Tens as supporting act, started in Chicago on March 16, 2017.

Rikki Styxx (wife of drummer Dusty Watson) drummed with The Dollyrots from the fall of 2014 until May 2018.

=== Other work ===
The band has released a number of cover singles, including "Punk Rock Girls" by The Queers, "Let's Turkey Trot" by Little Eva, "Dream Lover" by Bobby Darin, and "Happy Together" by The Turtles. The Dollyrots recorded a cover of the song "There's A Barbarian in the Back Of My Car" by Voice of the Beehive for Snake Oil Supercharm, a 2003 tribute album to Zodiac Mindwarp and the Love Reaction. The band recorded a version of "Santa Baby" for the 2009 album A Blackheart Christmas and also recorded a cover of "Bad Reputation" by Joan Jett for the film Endless Bummer. In July 2011 the band announced that they would be teaming up with Bowling For Soup to release a split 7-inch. The Dollyrots vs. Bowling for Soup 7-inch featured both bands covering one of the others songs. The band also released a version of "Come Out And Play (Keep 'Em Separated)" by The Offspring with Jaret Reddick from Bowling For Soup on guest vocals. The Offspring's Noodles described it as "very cool" and said that the band was "truly honored." On 4 October 2017, two days after the death of Tom Petty, the band released a cover of "American Girl" with all proceeds going to Midnight Mission, an organization that both they and Petty had supported. After the release of the 2019 film Radioactive, the band recorded a 4-song tribute EP entitled Active on the Radio.

== Uses in media ==
Songs by the Dollyrots have been used in films, TV shows, and commercials.

- "Because I'm Awesome" was used in The Sisterhood of the Traveling Pants 2, in the trailer for Bring It On: Fight to the Finish, Kill Speed, and Picture This. The song has been featured on a number of television shows, including ABC's Ugly Betty, ABC Family's Greek (where they appeared as themselves), Oxygen's Bad Girls Road Trip and the CW's Reaper (as well as several other songs). The song was featured for a month as a "Hip Clipz" on the website of Curly Grrlz Skateboards. The song was featured in a back-to-school commercial for the Kohl's department store chain. It also appeared in the official "Vancouver 2010" video game for the Vancouver 2010 Winter Olympics.
- "Watch Me Go (Kissed Me, Killed Me)" was featured on the E! show The Simple Life.
- The Dollyrots cover of "Brand New Key" was used on the Fox sitcom Raising Hope.
- The Dollyrots cover of the Joan Jett classic "Bad Reputation" was used in the National Lampoon movie Endless Bummer. It was also used in the films Easy A and Barely Lethal, and was also used in the promotional trailers for Horrid Henry: The Movie.
- "Feed Me, Pet Me" was used in a 2003 Hewlett-Packard ad campaign in which the band also appeared with drummer Josh Valenti.
- "Kick Me to the Curb" and "Goodnight Tonight" were featured on the CSI: NY episode "Stuck on You", in which the band guest starred as members of the fictional indie band Rough Sects. In the episode, Kelly Ogden played Stephanie O'Dell, the bassist of Rough Sects.
- The band appear as themselves in the film Girltrash: All Night Long. Their song "Pour Tous Jours" is also performed in the film.
- The band has also lent their music to The Intellectual Saviors Podcast found on theintellectualsaviors.podbean.com and iTunes, where they also appeared on Episode 10.
- "Hyperactive" was featured in Episode 1 of The Challenge: Rivals II.
- "Come And Get It" was featured in Episode 4 of The Challenge: Free Agents.
- "City of Angels" was featured in Season 1, Episode 4 of Dickinson (TV series).

== Endorsements ==
The Dollyrots are endorsed by Gibson Guitars, Mesa-Boogie, Monster Pro Audio, Sennheiser, Daisy Rock Girl Guitars, Clayton Picks, and Iron Fist Clothing.

== Band members ==
Current members

- Kelly Ogden – guitars, backing vocals (2000–2001); bass, lead vocals (2001–present)
- Luis Cabezas – guitars, backing vocals (2000–present)

Other members

- Josh Harrold – bass, lead vocals (2000–2001)
- Mike Benbow – drums (2000–2001)
- Frank Beasley – drums (2001–2002)
- Josh Valenti – drums (2002–2004; Eat My Heart Out)
- Amy Wood – drums, percussion (2004–2006, 2009, 2013; Because I'm Awesome and Barefoot and Pregnant)
- Chris Black – drums, backing vocals (2006–2011; A Little Messed Up)
- Alicia Warrington – drums (2011–2012; The Dollyrots)
- James Carman – drums, backing vocals (2012–2014; Love Songs, Werewolves, & Zombies)
- Stacy Jones – drums (2013; Barefoot and Pregnant)
- Aixa Vilar – drums (2014)
- Mel Funk – drums (2014)
- Mickey Richards – drums (2014)
- Rikki Styxx – drums (2014–2018; Family Vacation: Live in Los Angeles and Whiplash Splash)
- Justin McGrath – drums (2018–2023)
- Noah Levy – drums (2019; Daydream Explosion)
- Aixa Vilar – drums (2023–present)

Touring members

- Simon Hancock - percussion

== Discography ==
=== Studio albums ===
Album	Release date	Record charts	Label
Eat My Heart Out	September 14, 2004		Lookout!
Because I'm Awesome	March 13, 2007		Blackheart
A Little Messed Up	August 17, 2010		Blackheart
The Dollyrots	September 18, 2012		Arrested Youth
Barefoot and Pregnant	February 18, 2014	#7 Billboard Heatseekers	Arrested Youth
Love Songs, Werewolves, & Zombies	February 25, 2014		Arrested Youth
Family Vacation: Live in Los Angeles	March 11, 2016	#15 Billboard Heatseekers	Arrested Youth
Whiplash Splash	March 24, 2017	#13 Billboard Heatseekers	Arrested Youth
Daydream Explosion	July 12, 2019	#7 Billboard Heatseekers	Wicked Cool Records
Night Owls	October 13, 2024		Wicked Cool Records

=== Extended plays ===
- Feed Me Pet Me (2003)
- Love and Revolt (2006)
- The Dollyrots vs. Bowling for Soup (2011)
- Arrested Youth (2011)
- A Dollyrots Christmas EP (2014)
- Mama's Gonna Knock You Out (2016)

=== Split albums ===
- Bowling for Soup Presents: One Big Happy! (split album with Bowling for Soup and Patent Pending) (2012) Que-so/Brando Records

=== Singles ===
==== Official singles ====
- "Kick Me to the Curb" (2004)
- "New College" (2004)
- "Because I'm Awesome" (April 24, 2007)
- "Brand New Key" (2007)
- "My Best Friend's Hot" (April 15, 2008)
- "California Beach Boy" (2010)
- "Santa Baby" (2010)
- "Rollercoaster" (April 26, 2011)
- "Playing with Fire" (2011)
- "Hyperactive" (2013)
- "Satellite" (2013)
- "Twist Me To The Left" (2013)
- "Get Weird" (2014)
- "Come and Get It" (2014)
- "Save Me" (2016)
- "Dance Like A Maniac" (2017)
- "Babbling Idiot" (2017)
- "Just Because I'm Blonde" (2017)
- "Get Radical" (2018)
- "Everything" (2019)
- "Make Me Hot" (2020)
- "Easy" (2021)
- "Hey Girl"/"I Touch Myself" (2023)
- "Tell Me" (2023)
- "Wrapped in Sunshine" (2024)

==== Other singles ====
- "Promised Call" (2005)
- "Watch Me Go (Kissed Me, Killed Me)" (2007)
- "Messed Up Christmas" (2010)
- "Because I'm Santa" (Christmas cover of "Because I'm Awesome") (2012)
- "I Saw Mommy Biting Santa Claus" (2013)
- "Let's Turkey Trot" (2014)
- "Run Run Rudolph" (2015)
- "All I Want for Christmas" (2016)
- "Last Christmas" (2017)
- "Fairytale of New York" (2019)

== Music videos ==
Year	Name
2004	"Kick Me to the Curb"
2004	"New College"
2007	"Because I'm Awesome"
2008	"Brand New Key"
2008	"Out of L.A."
2011	"Rollercoaster"
2011	"Playing with Fire" (photoclip)
2012	"Hyperactive"
2013	"Satellite"
2013	"Twist Me to the Left"
2013	"Starting Over Again"
2013	"I Saw Mommy Biting Santa Claus"
2013	"Hyperactive" (acoustic, lyric video)
2014	"Barefoot and Pregnant"
2014	"Get Weird"
2019	"Animal"

Other videos

Year	Name
2002	"Feed Me, Pet Me" (ad for Hewlett-Packard)
2010	"Messed Up Xmas" (Holiday Single)
2012	"Because I'm Santa" (Holiday Single)
2013	"Love Ya, Love Ya, Love Ya" (Kelly Ogden feat. Jaret Reddick)
2014	"Anarchy and Disney"

=== Compilation appearances ===
- Stranded In Stereo (volume 5) – includes "Because I'm Awesome"

== Awards ==
- Winner of the 7th annual Independent Music Awards Vox Pop vote for best Pop/Rock song "Because I'm Awesome".
- Winner of "Coolest Song In The World 2007 - for the song Because I'm Awesome" by a listener vote on Sirius XM's Little Steven's Underground Garage.
- Winner of "Coolest Song In The World 2019 - for the song Everything" by a listener vote on Sirius XM's Little Steven's Underground Garage.
