= The Dollyrots (album) =

Studio album by The Dollyrots
- Released: September 18, 2012
- Genre: Pop punk
- Length: 38:27
- Label: Arrested Youth Records
- Producer: John Fields

The Dollyrots chronology
| A Little Messed Up (2010) | The Dollyrots (2012) | Bowling for Soup Presents: One Big Happy! (2012) |

The Dollyrots is the fourth studio album by the Los Angeles–based pop-punk band The Dollyrots, released on Arrested Youth Records in 2012. According to an article on Yahoo! by Jason Tanamor, the band used a Kickstarter campaign to raise funds to record and release the album. Their original goal was to raise $7,500 but they ended up raising over $33,000.

== Reception ==
- "The Dollyrots are known for their stripped down 3-piece sound and songs from the Ramones school of songwriting - pure pop drenched in attitude. This is true of this record." (Molly Segers, Atlanta Music Guide)
- "Kelly's voice is one that conveys enjoyment of the music that the band plays and as a whole you certainly label them alongside their good friends Bowling For Soup as "feel good" music. Luis's riffs are energetic and groove filled which further help add to the feel good factor and tick the boxes as far as quality pop punk is concerned." (Jamie Giberti, Scribes of Metal)
- "The record sounds slicker than a slice of Velveeta that's been sitting out on the counter all day, but every song sounds like a hit." (Tim Sendra, AllMusic)
- "The Dollyrots' self-titled CD doesn't stray far from previous offerings, with the signature chug-chug style and catchy melodies the group is known for. Fans of the Ramones will once again find plenty to eat up." (Matt Munoz, The Bakersfield Californian)

== Track listing ==
All tracks are written by Luis Cabezas and Kelly Ogden except where noted.

| No. | Title | Length |
|---|---|---|
| 1. | "Starting Over" | 0:55 |
| 2. | "I Wanna Go" (Cabezas, Ogden, Martin Harrington) | 3:11 |
| 3. | "Hyperactive" | 2:33 |
| 4. | "Satellite" | 3:17 |
| 5. | "Twist Me to the Left" | 2:39 |
| 6. | "Time Will Stop" | 3:49 |
| 7. | "So Wrong It's Right" | 2:55 |
| 8. | "F U Famous" (Cabezas, Ogden, Kay Hanley, Michael Eisenstein) | 3:03 |
| 9. | "Pretty on the Outside" | 2:54 |
| 10. | "South of the Border" | 3:32 |
| 11. | "After 2012" | 2:54 |
| 12. | "Starting Over Again" | 2:49 |
| 13. | "Because I'm Awesome (2012)" | 3:24 |

== Personnel ==
The following people worked on the album (taken from album sleeve notes).

The Dollyrots

- Kelly Ogden – bass, vocals
- Luis Cabezas – guitar, vocals
- Alicia Warrington – drums

Other musicians

- John Fields – drums, keyboards, programming
- Stephen Lu – chincello (track 11)
- Ken Chastain – sound fx (tracks 10 and 11)
- Diane Small – gang vocals
- Risty Perez – gang vocals
- Jessica "Fuzzy" Isaacs – gang vocals
- Chris Black – gang vocals
- Lauren Dolan – gang vocals
- Christina Ownby – gang vocals
- Ela Darling – gang vocals

Production

- John Fields – producer, mixing
- Paul David Hager – mixing
- C. Todd Nielsen – assistant mixing
- Brad Blackwood – mastering

Cover

- Kii Arens – design and photos
